= Senator Kendrick (disambiguation) =

John B. Kendrick (1857–1933) was a U.S. Senator from Wyoming from 1917 to 1933. Senator Kendrick may also refer to:

- Carroll Kendrick (1852–1923), Mississippi State Senate
- Jeptha J. Kendrick (1811–?), California State Senate
- William H. Kendrick (1822–1901), Florida State Senate
