= William Kendrick =

William Kendrick may refer to:

- William H. Kendrick, soldier, state senator, pioneer and lecturer in Florida
- William Kendrick of the Kendrick baronets
  - Sir William Kendrick, 1st Baronet (died 1684)
  - Sir William Kendrick, 2nd Baronet (1665–1699)
- William Kendrick (footballer)
