= Henry B. Plant Museum =

United States historic place in Tampa, Florida

- Tampa Bay Hotel
- U.S. National Register of Historic Places
- U.S. National Historic Landmark
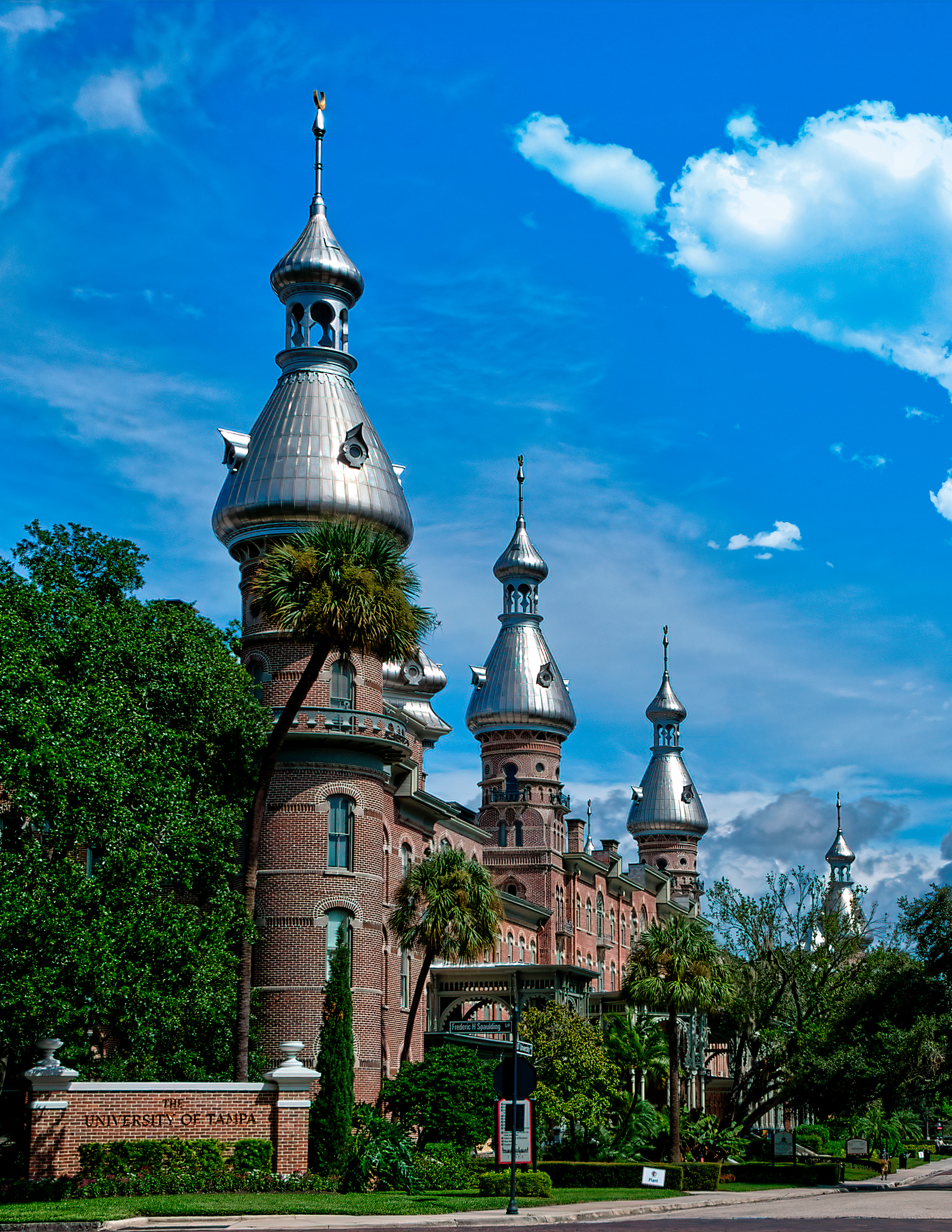
- Location: 401 W. Kennedy Blvd., Tampa, Florida
- Coordinates: 27°56′43.7″N 82°27′50.45″W
- Area: 4.5 acres (1.8 ha)
- Built: 1888–1891
- Architect: John A. Wood
- Architectural style: Moorish Revival
- NRHP reference No.: 72000322

Significant dates
- Added to NRHP: December 5, 1972
- Designated NHL: May 11, 1976

The Henry B. Plant Museum (Plant Museum) is located in the south wing of Plant Hall on the University of Tampa's campus. It is located at 401 West Kennedy Boulevard in Tampa, Florida. Plant Hall was originally built by Henry B. Plant as the Tampa Bay Hotel; a 511-room resort-style hotel that opened on February 5, 1891, near the terminus of the Plant System rail line, also forged and owned by Plant. The Plant Museum's exhibits focus on historical Gilded Age tourism in the Tampa Bay area of Florida, the elite lifestyle of the hotel's guests, and the Tampa Bay Hotel's use during the Spanish–American War. As such, the Plant Museum is set up in the Historic House Museum style. Exhibits display artifacts in a manner that reflects the original placement and usage within the related historic building.

The Tampa Bay Hotel was designed by architect J.A. Wood, who also designed the Old Hillsborough County Courthouse in 1892 in Tampa, Florida, as well as the Oglethorpe Hotel and the Mahoney-McGarvey House in Brunswick, Georgia.

== History ==
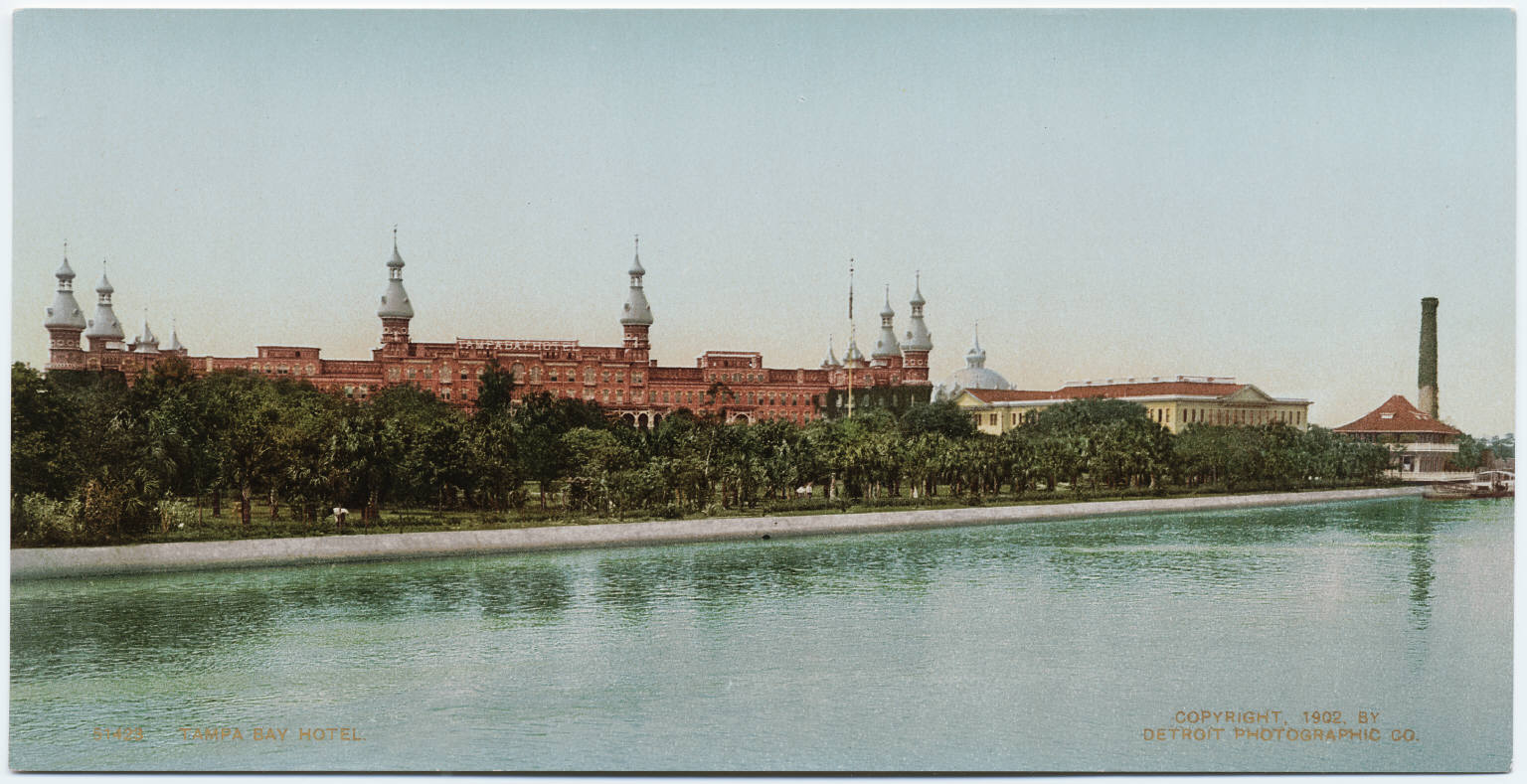
Tampa Bay Hotel, ca. 1900.

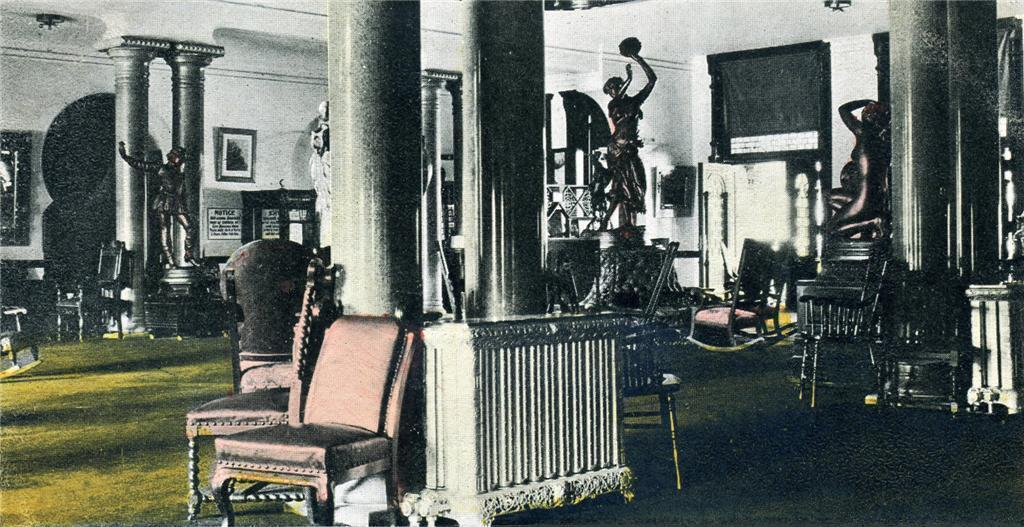
Hotel rotunda and sitting room in c. 1905

=== Tampa Bay Hotel ===
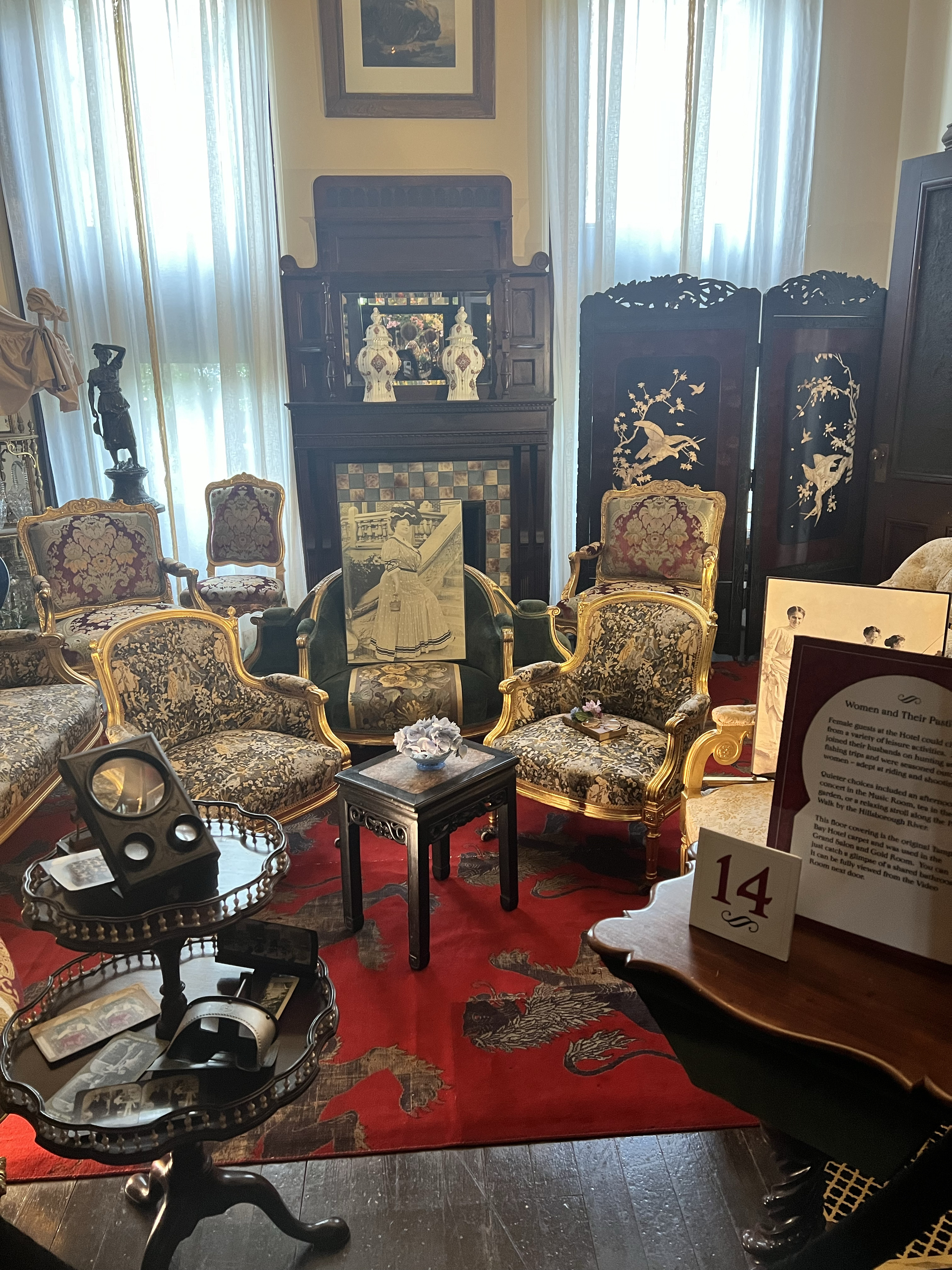
Women's Hall of the Plant Hotel located in the Henry B Plant museum

The Tampa Bay Hotel was built by railroad magnate Henry B. Plant between 1888 and 1891. The construction cost was over $3 million. The Tampa Bay Hotel was considered the premier hotel of the eight that Plant built to anchor his rail line. The hotel covers 6 acres (24,000 m^{2}) and is a quarter-mile long. The Tampa Bay Hotel was equipped with the first elevator ever installed in Florida, and the elevator is still functional today, making it one of the oldest continually operational elevators in the nation. The 511 rooms and suites were the first in Florida to have electric lighting and telephones. Most rooms also included private bathrooms, complete with a full-size tub. Room Pricing ranged from $5.00 to $15.00 a night at a time when the average hotel in Tampa charged $1.25 to $2.00. The poured-concrete, steel-reinforced structure of the building was advertised as fireproof.

The grounds of the hotel spanned 150 acres (0.61 km^{2}) and included a golf course, bowling alley, racetrack, casino and an indoor heated swimming pool. In all, 21 buildings could be found on the hotel's grounds. The Moorish Revival architectural theme was selected by Plant for its exotic European appeal to the widely traveled Victorians who would be his primary customers. The hotel has six minarets, four cupolas, and three domes spanning five stories all trimmed in ornate Victorian Gingerbread. In the early 1990s, all were restored to their original stainless steel state.

From 1889 to 1891, Plant scoured Europe collecting lavish objects to decorate the hotel in grandeur. Art arrived "by the trainload". Despite the immense size of the hotel, the purchases Plant made overflowed the space and the surplus had to be disposed of at auction. Much of the original art and furnishings have been removed, but the wing in Plant Hall conserved as the Henry B. Plant Museum contains "a bewildering assortment of rococo bronzes, furniture, clocks, tapestries, paintings, and vases, one vase being a gift from the Emperor of Japan."

During the Tampa Bay Hotel's operating period from 1891 to 1930, it housed thousands of guests, including hundreds of celebrities and political figures. Upon the outbreak of the Spanish–American War, Plant convinced the United States military to use his hotel as a base of operations. Generals and high-ranking officers stayed in the hotel to plan invasion strategies, while enlisted men encamped on the hotel's acreage. Colonel Theodore (Teddy) Roosevelt and his Rough Riders were also stationed at the hotel during this time. Roosevelt retained a suite and during the day led his men in battle exercises on the grounds. Other notable visitors of the Tampa Bay Hotel included Sarah Bernhardt, Clara Barton, Stephen Crane, the Queen of the United Kingdom, the Prince of Wales, Winston Churchill, and Ignacy Paderewski. Babe Ruth was also a guest of the hotel during its latter days and signed his first baseball contract in the Grand Dining Room. In 1919, Ruth hit his longest home run during a spring training game at Plant Field, adjacent to the hotel.

== Closing and renewal ==
The Tampa Bay Hotel officially closed its doors in 1930, due to the Great Depression severely curtailing tourism. The hotel remained empty and unused for three years. On August 2, 1933, the Tampa Bay Junior College was granted permission to move into the hotel, using the rooms that were once suites as classrooms, laboratories, and administration offices, and due to the large amount of space afforded by the hotel, the scope of the junior college expanded, causing it to become the University of Tampa. The Tampa Municipal Museum was established by the city to preserve the hotel in its original form and co-exist with the newly established University. In 1941, the city of Tampa signed a 99-year lease with the University of Tampa for $1.00 a year. The lease excluded the southeast wing of the building to allow for the housing of the museum. In 1974, the Tampa Municipal Museum was renamed the Henry B. Plant Museum.

== Recent ==
Today, in addition to serving as offices, laboratories, and classrooms for the University of Tampa, the south wing of Plant Hall is dedicated to preserving the opulence of the historic Tampa Bay Hotel. Various rooms in the wing display authentic artifacts from the old hotel, many of which were purchased by Mr. and Mrs. Plant themselves on various European shopping trips. These displays use the Historic House Museum method and depict suites, dining, war life, Victorian activities, and more with exhibits displaying artifacts laid out awaiting their Victorian user's return. The Plant Museum offers the option to book guided tours with a docent, as well as self-guided audio tours and a video entitled The Tampa Bay Hotel: Florida's First Magic Kingdom, all to showcase a life of leisure in historic Florida.

=== Events at the museum ===
Music in the Museum is a live, classical music performance of violin, harp, or guitar that takes place on the third Thursday of every month at 11 am to memorialize the live music that was so much a part of the Tampa Bay Hotel.

Fourth Friday The Henry B. Plant Museum participates in Tampa's Fourth Friday celebration promoting cultural venues by offering free entertainment on the Veranda from 5 pm-7 pm, January through October.

Sunday Tour Guided tours are offered by docents followed by the Upstairs/Downstairs theater performance - September - May (excluding December).

Upstairs/Downstairs at the Tampa Bay Hotel Occurs every Sunday at 2 pm, September through May. Single-character performances transport visitors back in time by discussing their experiences in the hotel. Characters are based either wholly or in part on actual guests or staff of the hotel.

Picnic in the Park is a program where adults and families can relax in the garden or try their hand at Victorian games, such as horseshoes, badminton, and croquet. Character actors are present in traditional Victorian attire and there is live entertainment on the Center Stage.

Victorian Christmas Stroll Visitors can witness Victorian Christmas via a walk through the museum and gardens.

The Great Gatsby Party is hosted annually in the Fletcher Lounge as a 1920s speakeasy featuring live period music, an open bar, food, games of chance, and vintage 1929 Bentley photo-ops.

An Eerie Evening at the Tampa Bay Hotel is held in October. Visitors tour the museum by moonlight and hear spooky stories from a bygone era.

The Plant Museum occasionally holds antique evaluations, similar to those done on Antiques Roadshow.

=== Special exhibitions ===
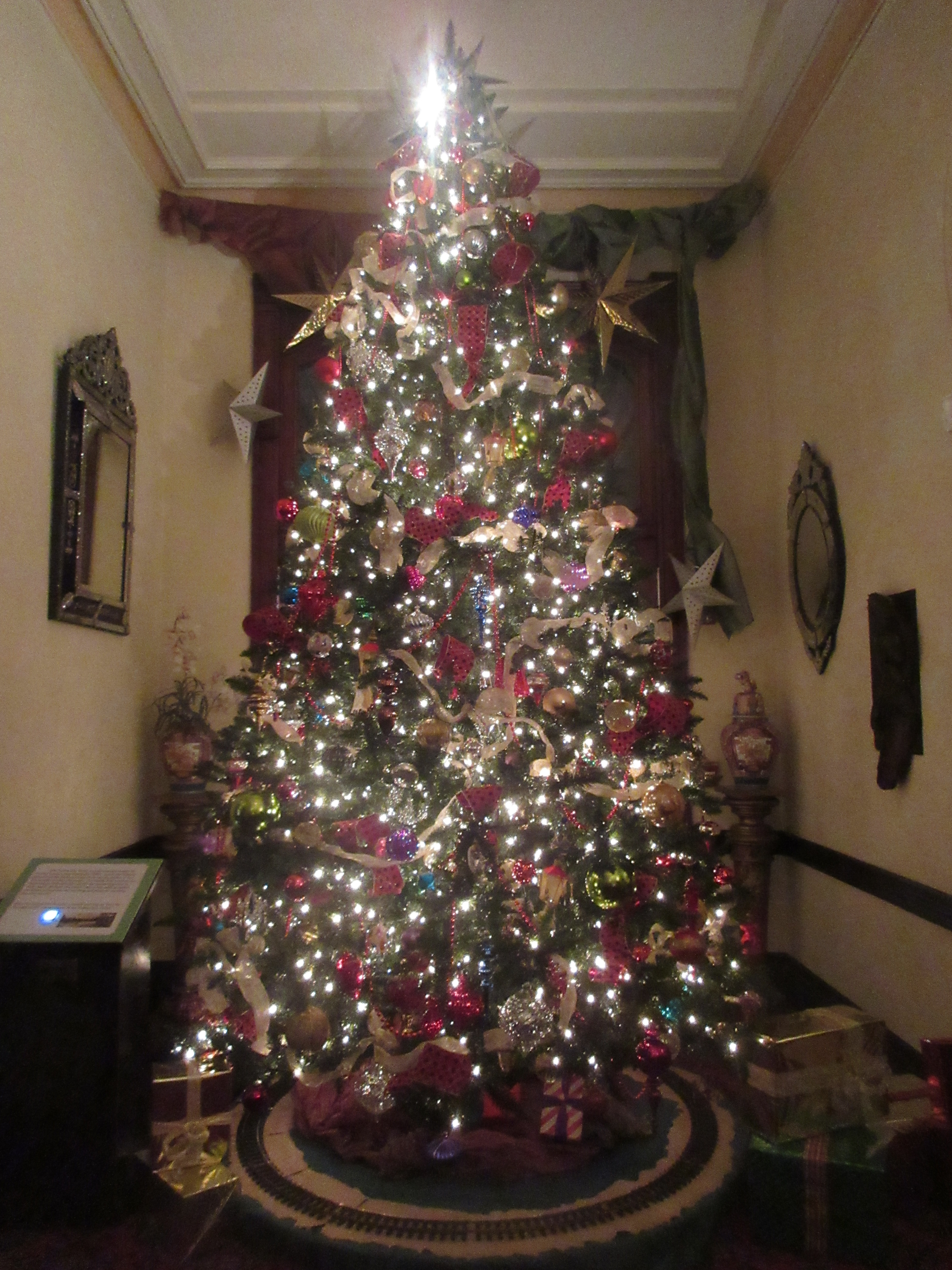
"Victorian Christmas stroll" at the museum.

The museum also hosts special exhibitions outside of its permanent collection. One such exhibit was The Sportin' Life from March 21, 2020 - February 21, 2021. Popular sporting paraphernalia from the Gilded Age was displayed, including Babe Ruth signed baseballs, assorted swimming suits, golf equipment, and racing equipment. Other notable exhibits included Imperial Designs: From the Habsburg’s Herend to the Romanov’s Fabergé and Red Cross Nursing and the War of 1898. In 2015, the Plant Museum hosted Passionate Design: The American Arts & Crafts Movement, a special exhibition of material from the collection of the Museum of the American Arts and Crafts Movement, now complete as of 2020 in St. Petersburg, Florida.

== Plant Park and hotel grounds ==
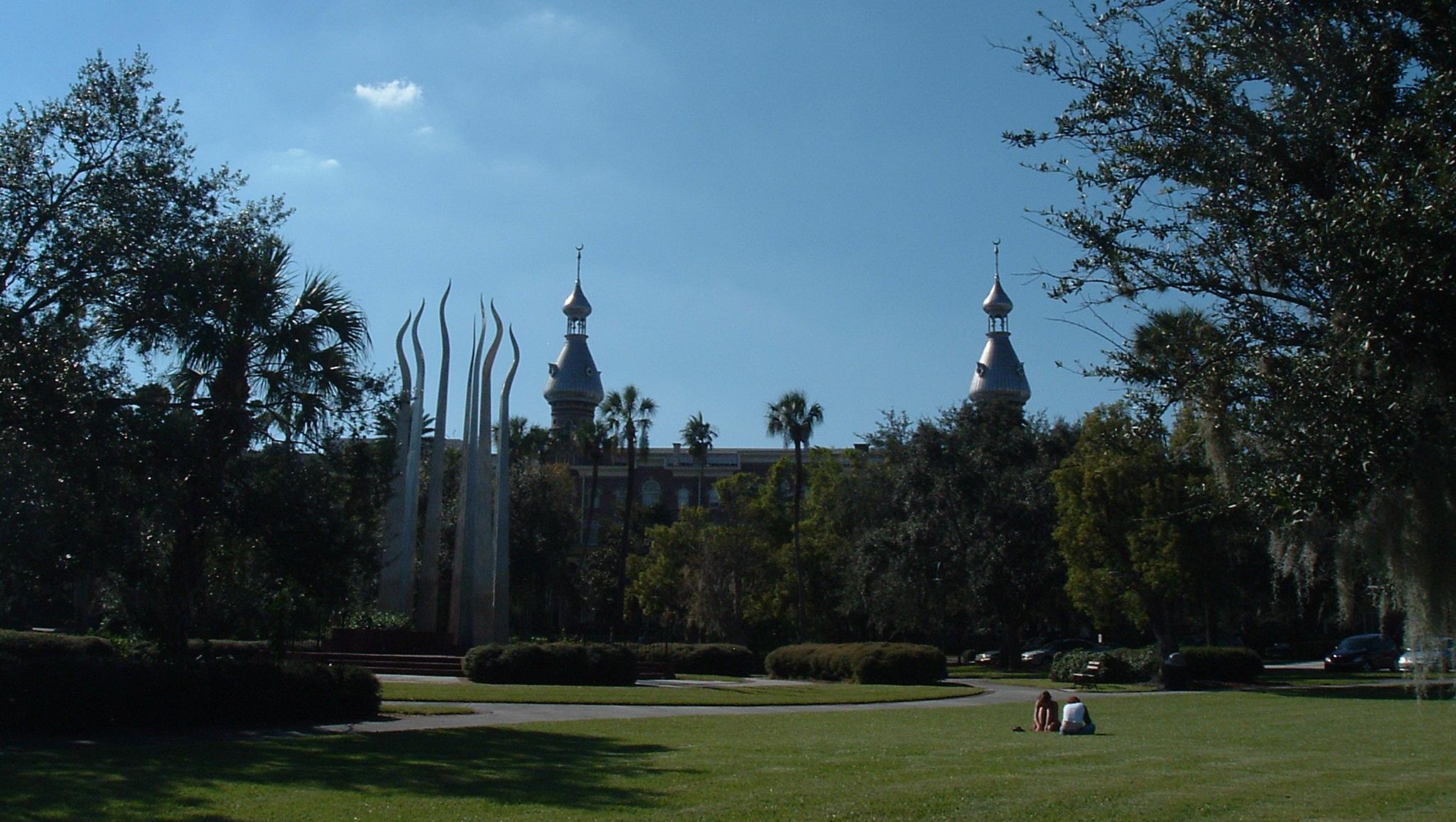
A view of Plant Park. Plant Hall is in the background, and the Sticks of Fire sculpture can be seen to the left

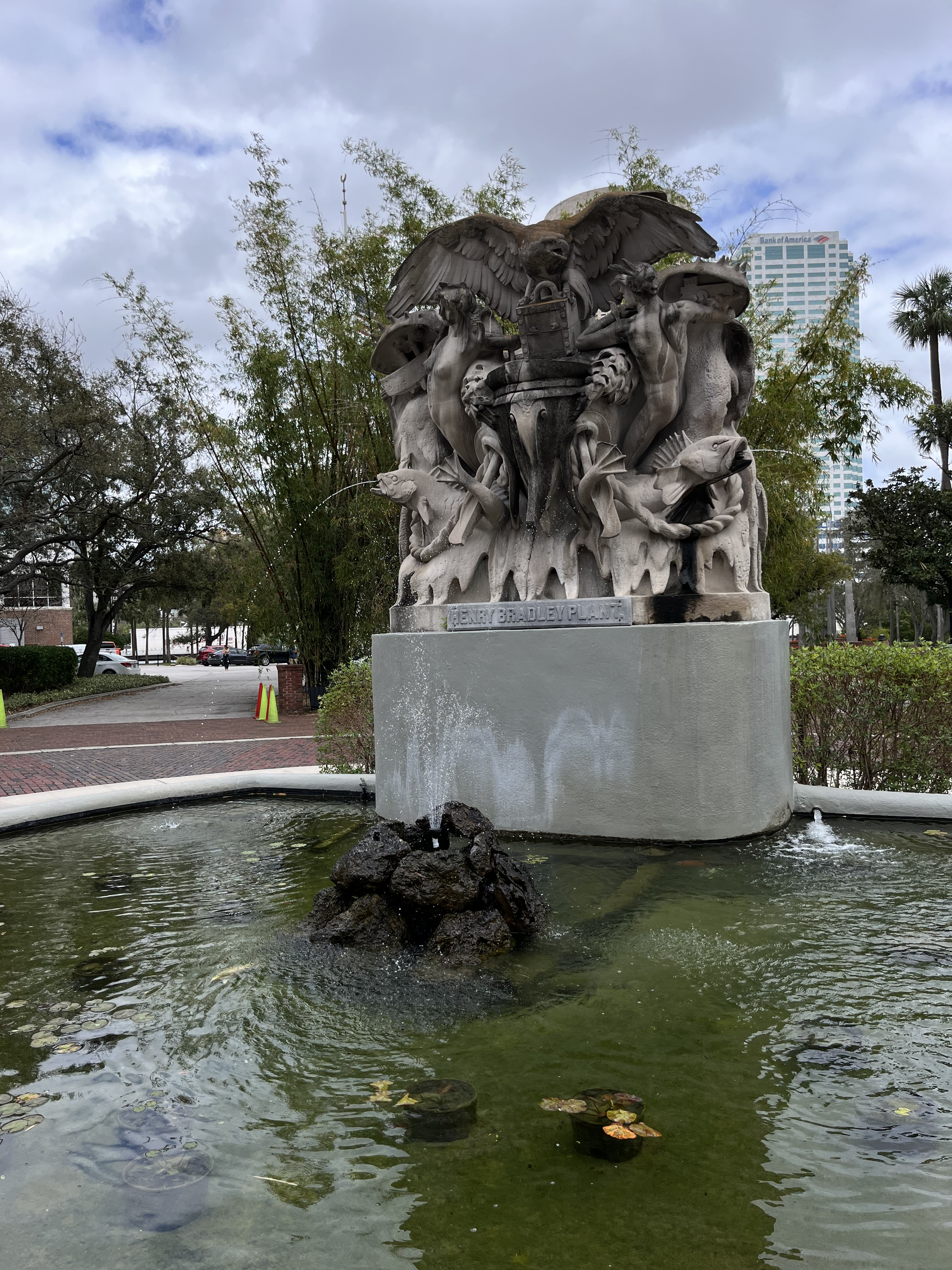
The Henry Bradley Plant Memorial Fountain and its statue named "Transportation."

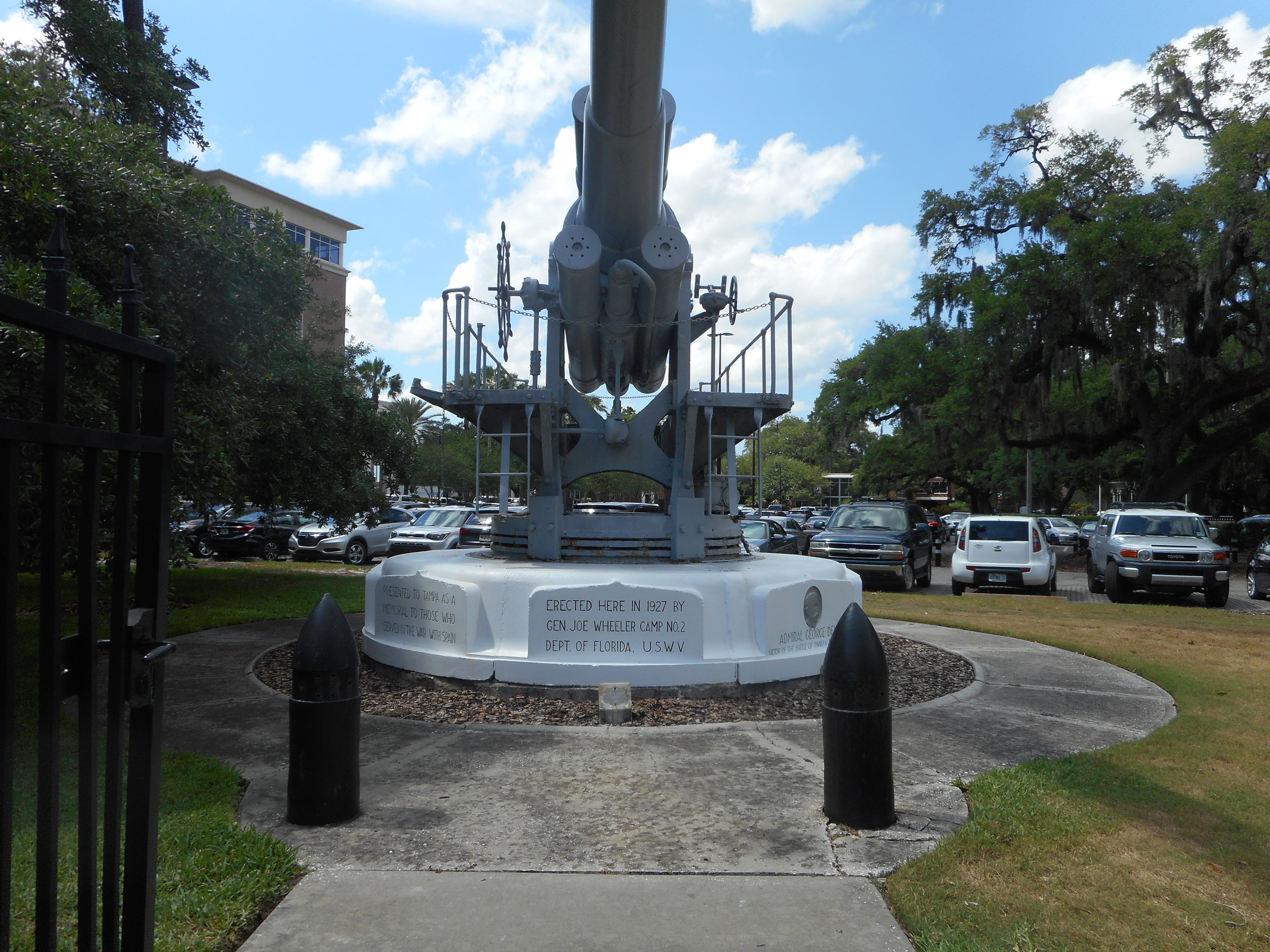
The Spanish–American War gun, replaced the first weapon originally located at Fort Dade on Egmont Key.

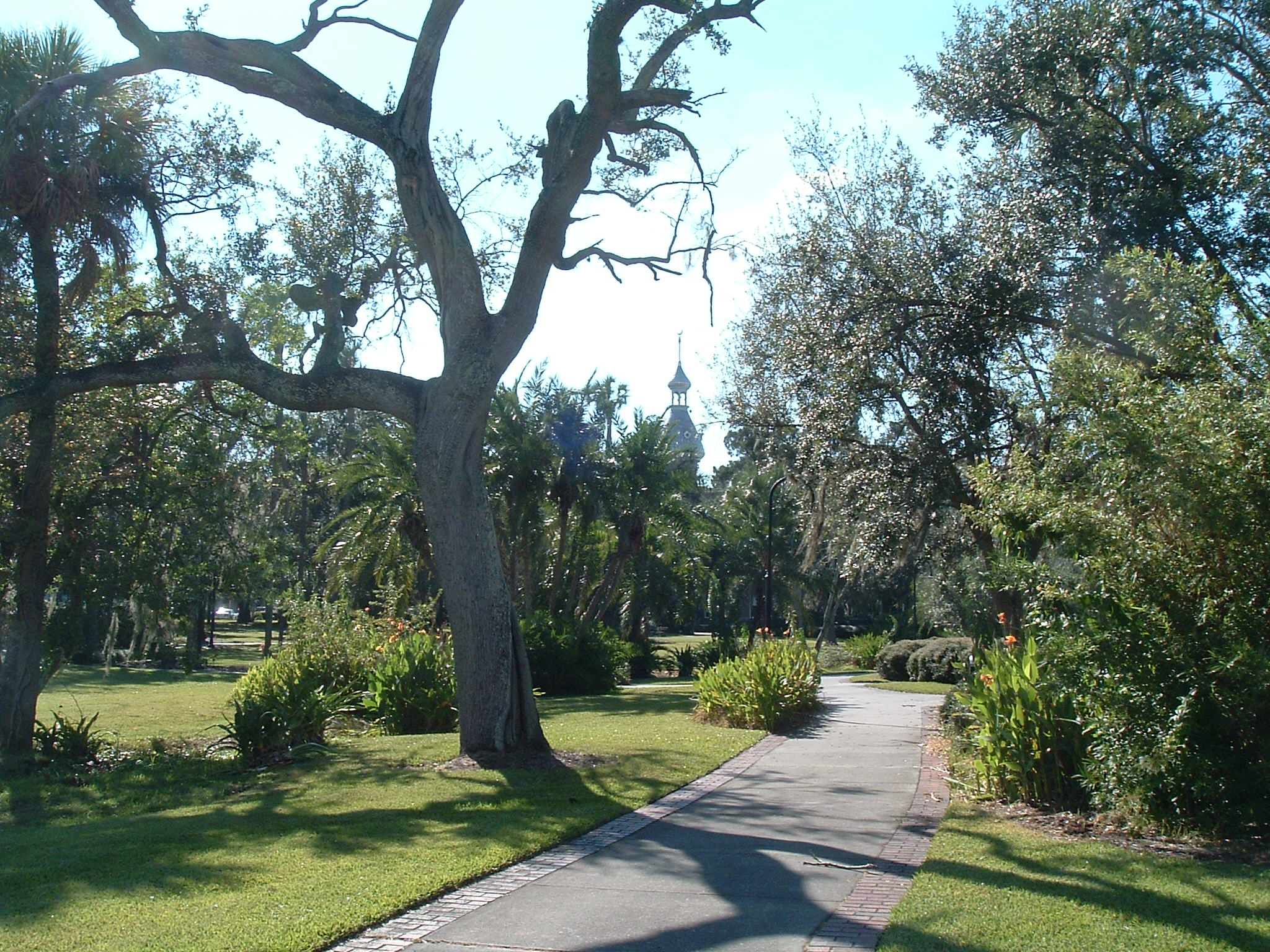
One of Plant Park's walking paths

The hotel once featured many attractions, most located in what is now known as Plant Park. Today, as part of both the University of Tampa's campus and the museum's grounds, several of these attractions can still be seen. At the entrance to the park is the "Henry Bradley Plant Memorial Fountain," commissioned by Margaret Plant in 1899 after her husband's death. The fountain's title is Transportation, and reflects Mr. Plant's system of trains and ships with carved representations of each on the sculpture. The eagle holding the strongbox is the logo of The Southern Express Company, Plant's first company. The fountain was carved from solid stone by George Grey Barnard and is the oldest public art in the city of Tampa. Conservation of this fountain was completed in 1995.

Facing the Hillsborough River near the University of Tampa's library are two historic cannons from Fort Brooke, the early 19th-century military post (established 1824) around which Tampa was developed. These are model 1819 iron 24-pounder seacoast guns and were originally part of a three-gun Confederate battery guarding Tampa Bay during the Civil War. On May 6, 1864, a Union naval raiding party captured Fort Brooke and, before withdrawing the next day, disabled the three heavy cannons by blowing one trunnion off of each (trunnions are the side projections on which cannons pivot to elevate or depress). This damage is still evident on the two Plant Park guns today.

In the 1890s, Henry Plant moved two of the long-abandoned cannons from the site of Fort Brooke to the grounds of Tampa Bay Hotel, placing them in a small earthwork revetment as a curiosity for the hotel's guests. Later the guns were placed on plinths made of coquina blocks. Recently, Tampa's Rough Riders civic group remounted the Fort Brooke cannons on replica gun carriages in a new stone revetment in Plant Park. For many years the lost third Fort Brooke cannon was a lawn decoration at 901 Bayshore Boulevard but was donated to a World War II scrap metal drive on October 9, 1942.

Facing Kennedy Boulevard in Plant Park is another historic weapon, a turn-of-the-century coast defense gun. This gun memorializes the important part Tampa played in the 1898 Spanish–American War and symbolically points south toward Cuba. The inscription on the monument base describes it as an eight-inch (203 mm) gun on a "disappearing carriage" taken from Fort Dade, an old coastal defense fort located on Egmont Key at the mouth of Tampa Bay. The true story is a bit more complicated.

The original Fort Dade gun described on the base was placed in Plant Park in November 1927 but was donated to a steel scrap drive during World War II. Following the war, an eight-inch (203 mm) gun of similar vintage (both were M1888 weapons) was obtained from Fort Morgan, Alabama and installed on the 1927 memorial's vacant plinth. The new gun is mounted on the top portion of a 1918 railway gun carriage dating from World War I rather than the "disappearing carriage" of the original Fort Dade weapon.

Plant Park once housed a small zoo located along Biology Creek, a stream that runs through part of the park. The creek is fed from an underground spring beneath the hotel and empties a few hundred yards away into the Hillsborough River. While in operation, the zoo contained a bear, an alligator, plus many smaller animals. The zoo was famous for its hundreds of squirrels and small lizards, which are still on campus. The bear and alligator were eventually moved upriver and became the core attractions for what became Lowry Park Zoo. The creek's name derives from a later period in its history when students from the university used its water to conduct various biology experiments.

A statue called Au Coup de Fusil, meaning The Shot (as in gunshot or rifle shot), can be found outside the hotel. These two bronze hounds represent two-pointers being alerted by the sound of a gunshot. The statues were sculpted by famed canine sculptor Eglantine Lemaître (French, 1852–1920) and were cast in France by Maurice Denonvilliers in 1890. Originally, they faced south rather than north and their rapt attention was focused on a small bronze squirrel placed on a low-hanging oak limb. However, this was a misinterpretation of the piece, as evidenced by the hounds' attention being diverted in different directions. The squirrel was eventually stolen, and the dogs were moved to their current location. Supposedly, the two dogs represent Mr. Plant's personal favorite hunting dogs and the hotel itself had kennels stocked with hunting dogs for guests to use on hunting expeditions.

The Friends of Plant Park (FoPP) is a Florida non-profit corporation with the mission to (a) assist with the restoration, preservation and maintenance of The Henry B. Plant Park, as a botanical garden open to the general public, (b) research and publicize the Victorian history of The Henry B. Plant Park, and (c) educate the public and cultivate community interest in and support for the foregoing activities. This group was formed in 1993.

Since 1997 the FoPP has hosted the annual GreenFest activities in Henry B. Plant Park to raise money. To date those funds, along with contributions from individuals, organizations, the City of Tampa, and Hillsborough County, have allowed for the restoration of and new exhibit of the cannons, the Victorian star-shaped garden bed, and a replica of the 112-foot flagpole with a 12X18-foot replica of the 45-star American flag (1891). The original flagpole was probably a ship's mast. A Florida state flag and a University of Tampa flag fly from the replica's crossbars.

== Accreditation, awards, and registrations ==
The Plant Museum is listed as an Accredited Museum and a Core Documents Verified Museum by the American Alliance of Museums.

On April 18, 2012, the American Institute of Architects' Florida Chapter placed the University of Tampa's Plant Hall on its list of Florida Architecture: 100 Years. 100 Places.

The Henry B. Plant Museum through the University of Tampa's Plant Hall was placed on the National Register of Historic Places as a U.S. National Historic Landmark, designated as such on December 5, 1972, under the name of the Tampa Bay Hotel.

== Gallery ==
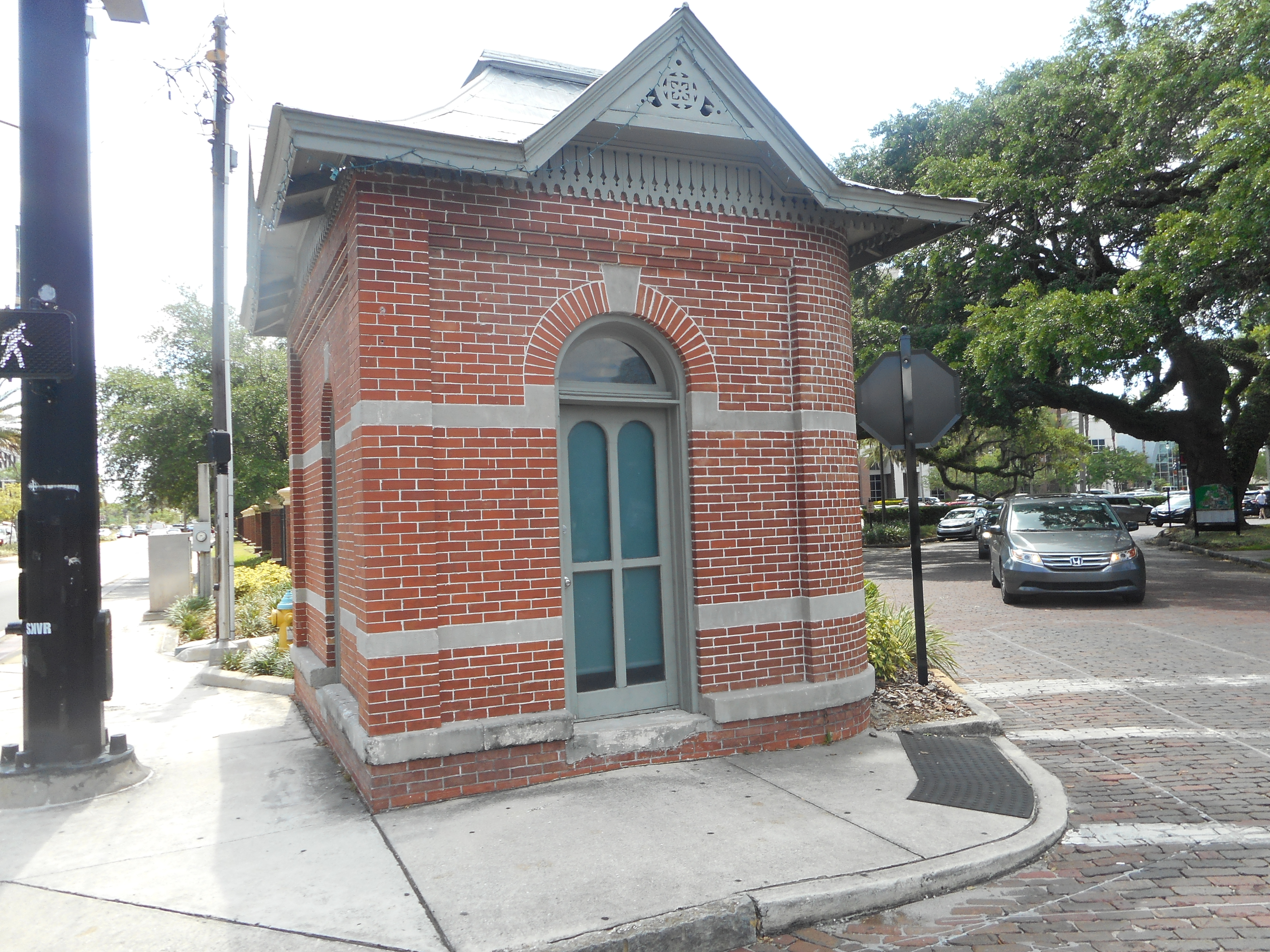

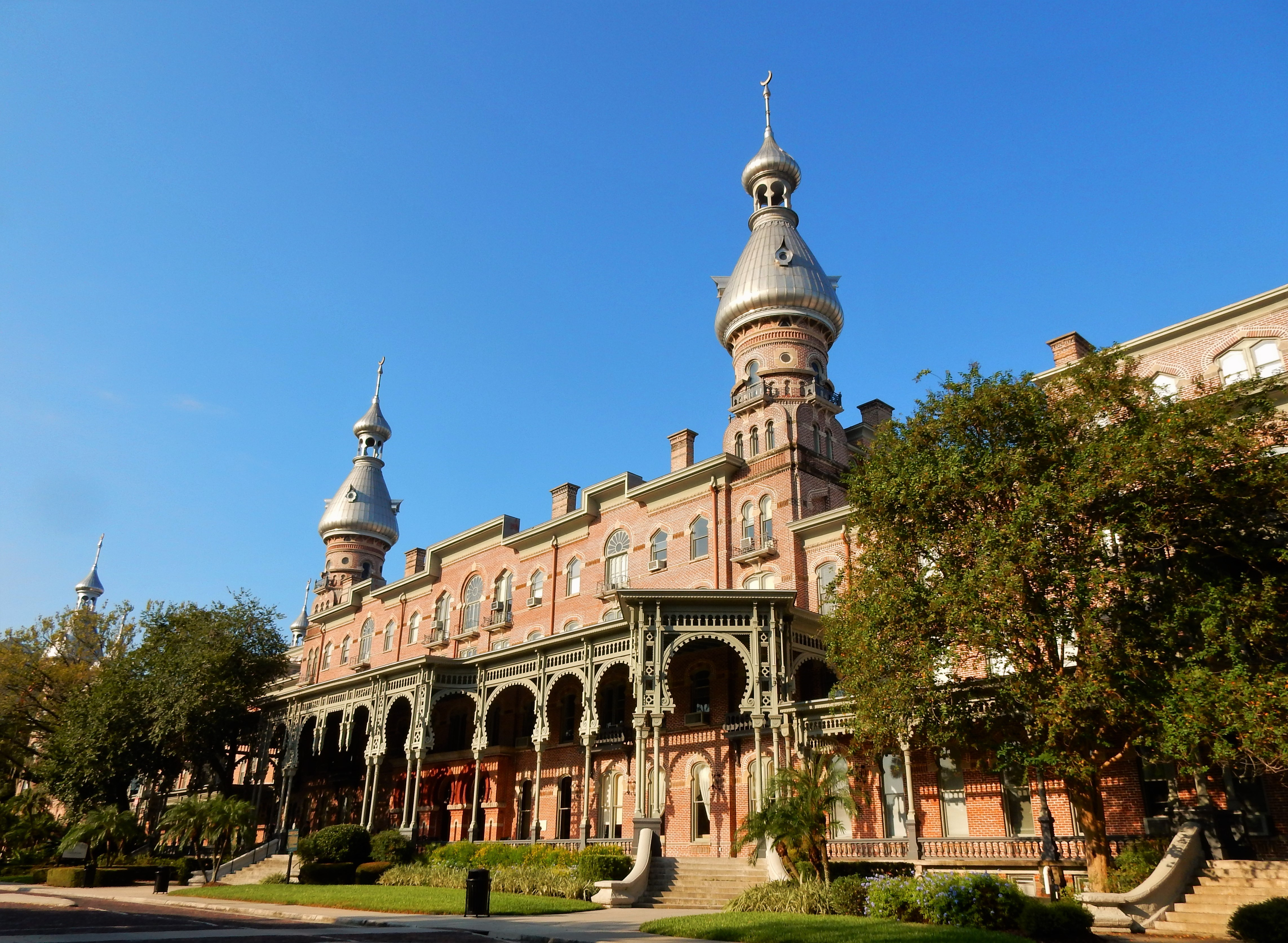

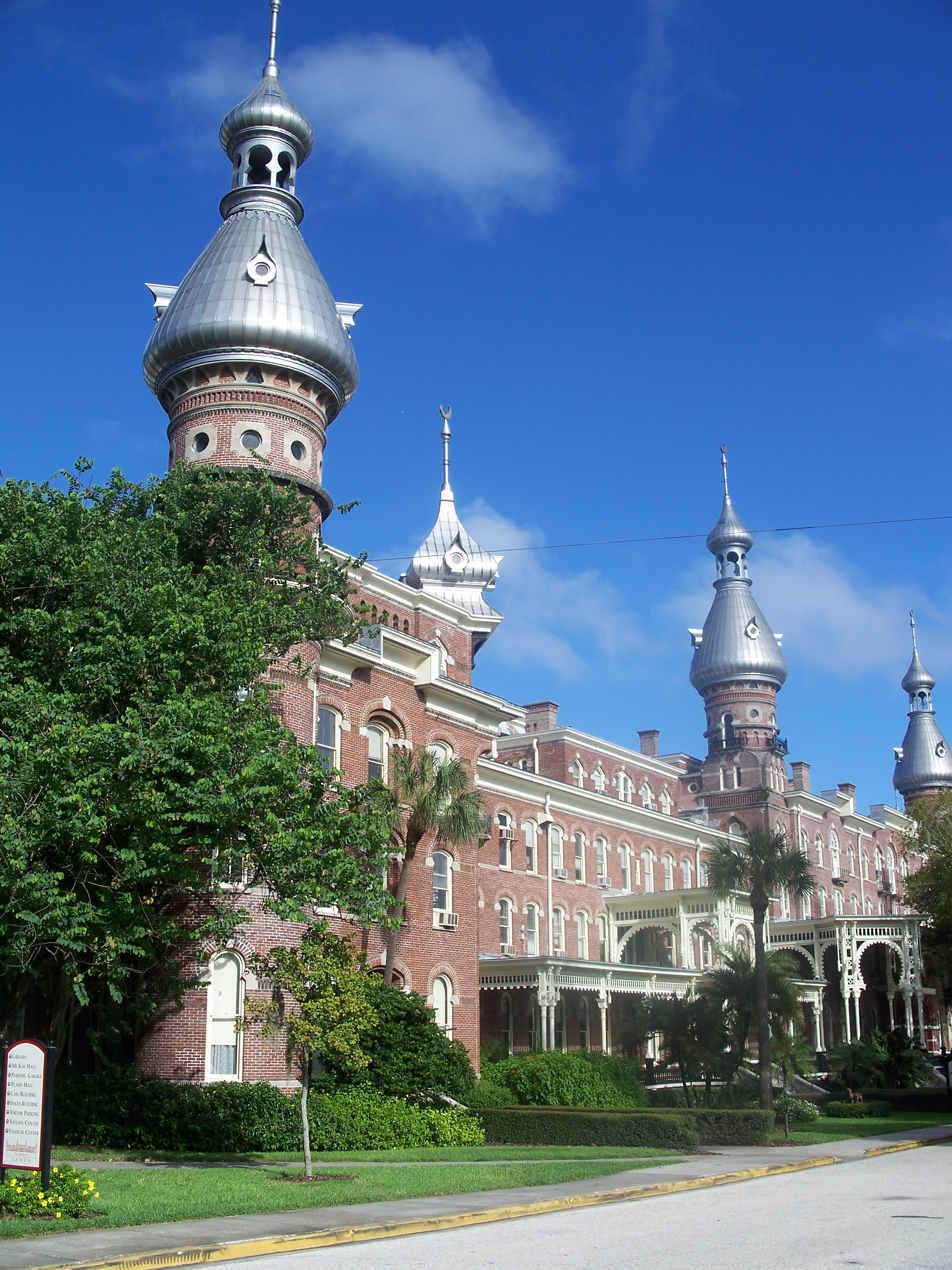

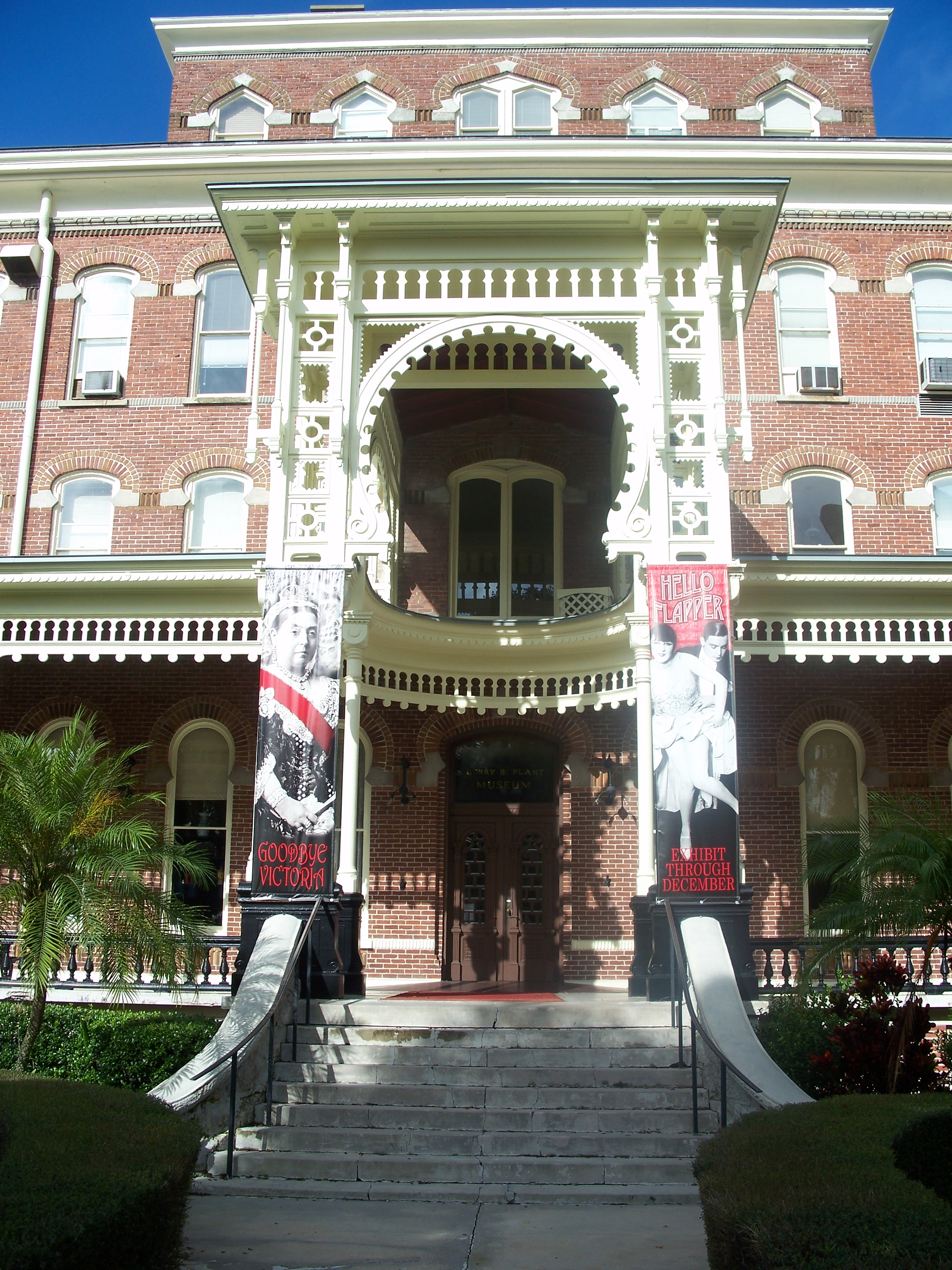

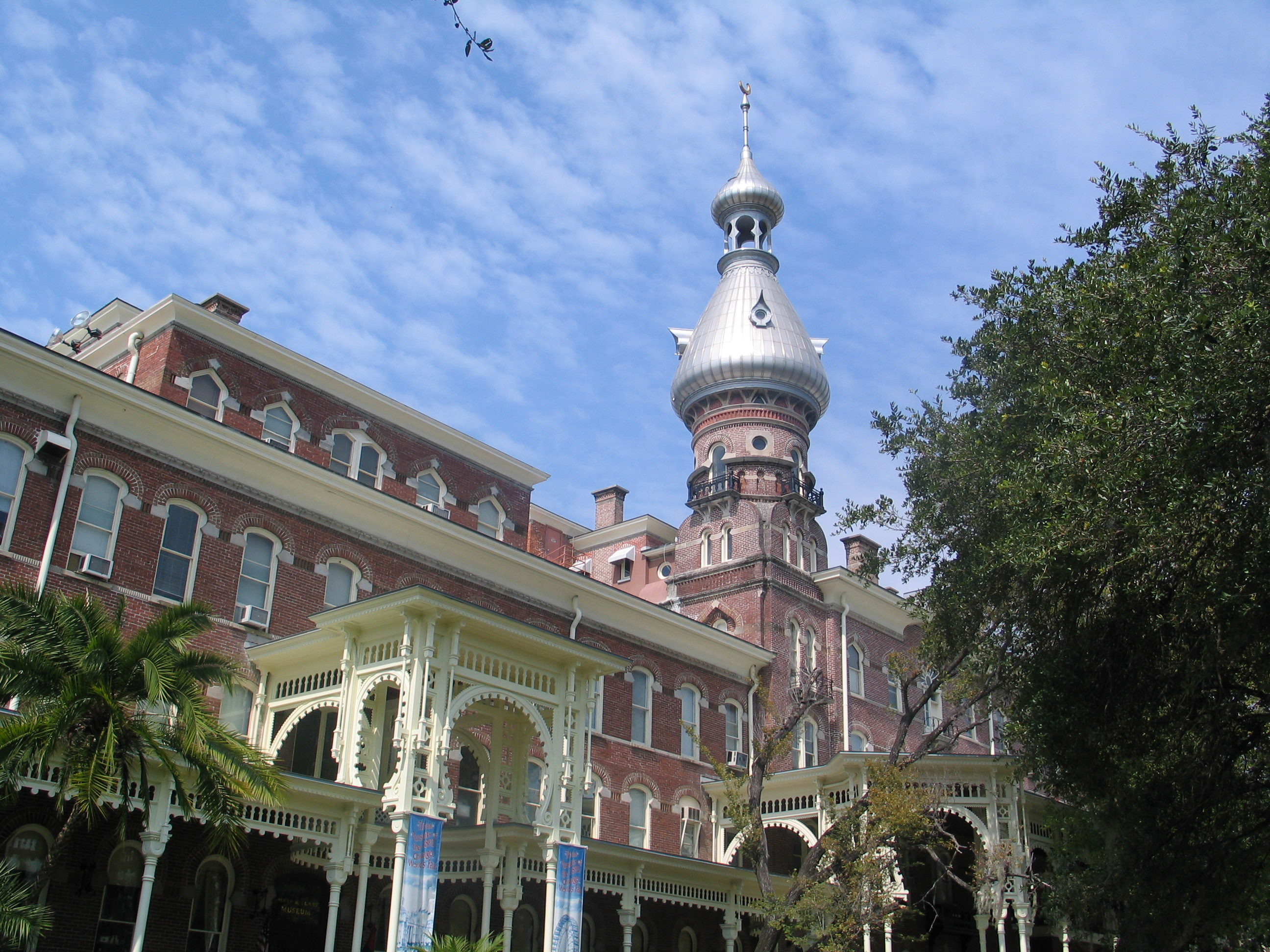

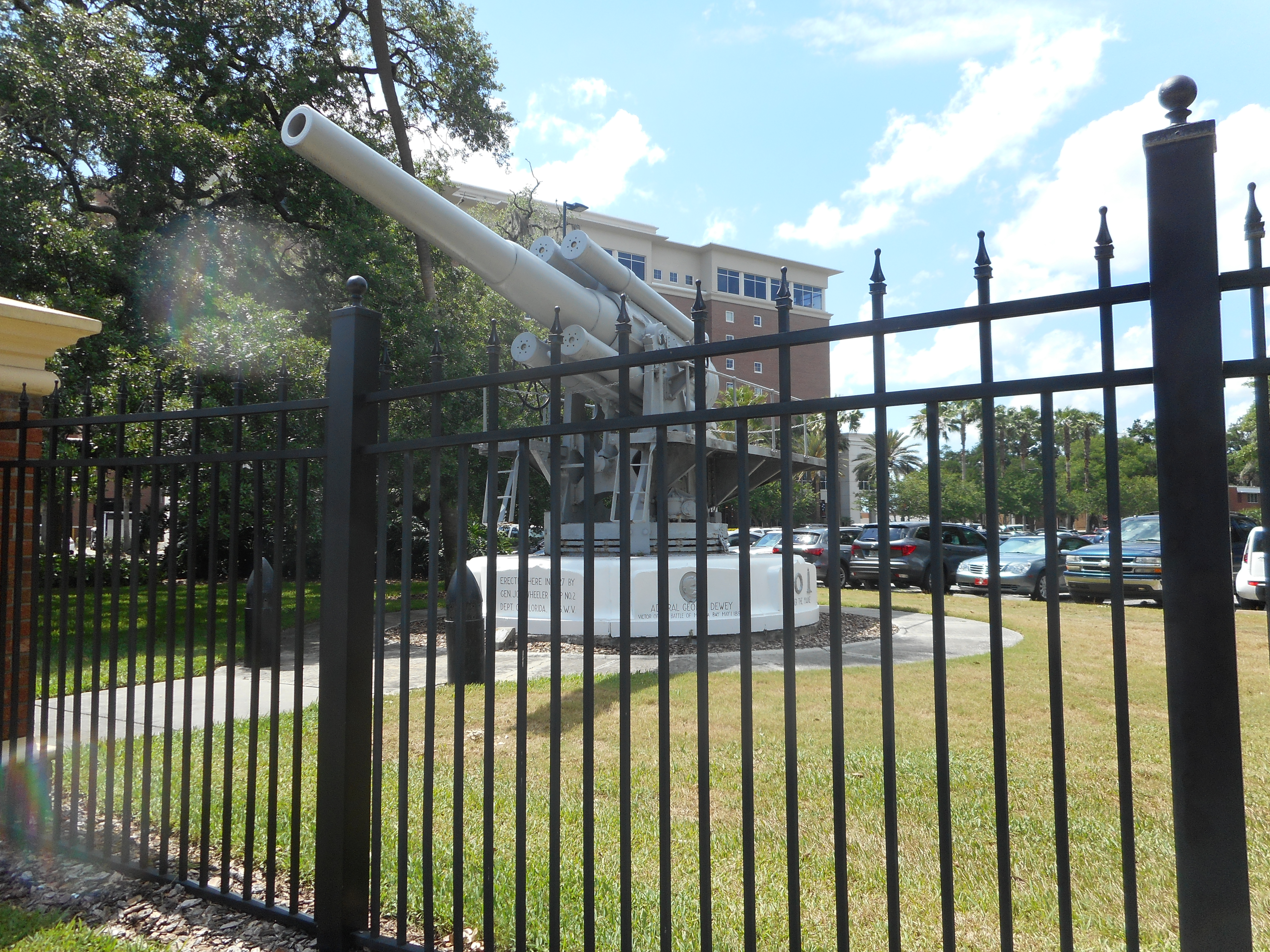

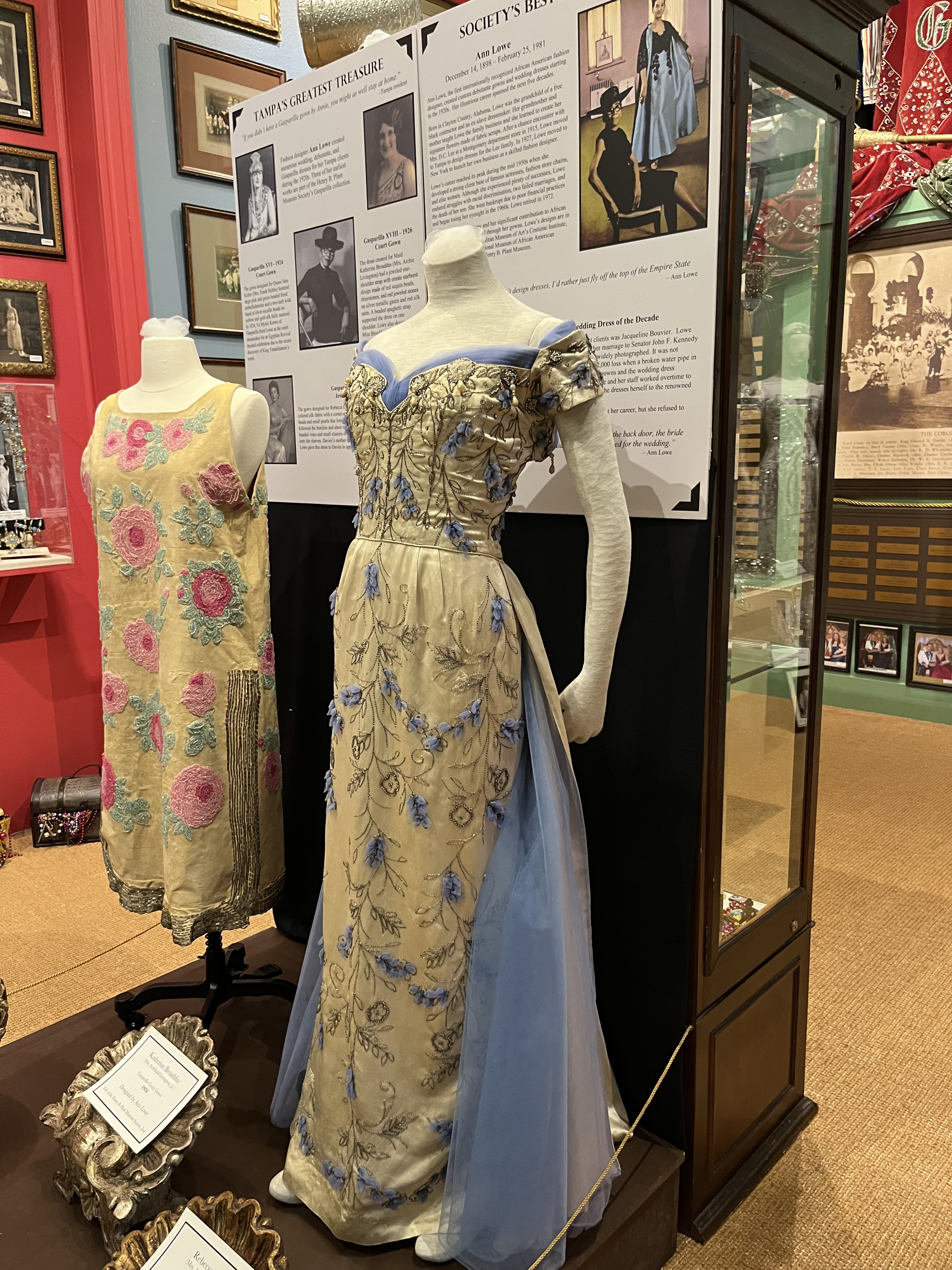

== See also ==
- Belleview-Biltmore Hotel
- Oglethorpe Hotel
