= Kendrick, Florida =

- Unincorporated community
- Location within Florida Location within the United States
- Coordinates: 29°15′13″N 82°10′04″W
- Country: United States
- State: Florida
- County: Marion
- Elevation: 79 ft (24 m)
- Time zone: UTC-5 (Eastern (EST))
  - Summer (DST): UTC-4 (EDT)
- Area code: 352
- GNIS feature ID: 285051

Kendrick is an unincorporated community outside Ocala in Marion County, Florida, United States. It is named for former Florida State Senator, lecturer, and pioneer William H. Kendrick.

== Notable person ==
- William V. Chappell, Jr., politician and lawyer, was born in Kendrick.
