= New York State Armory (Kingston) =

Historic 19th-century building designed by architect J. A. Wood

Coordinates: 41.927°N 73.999°W

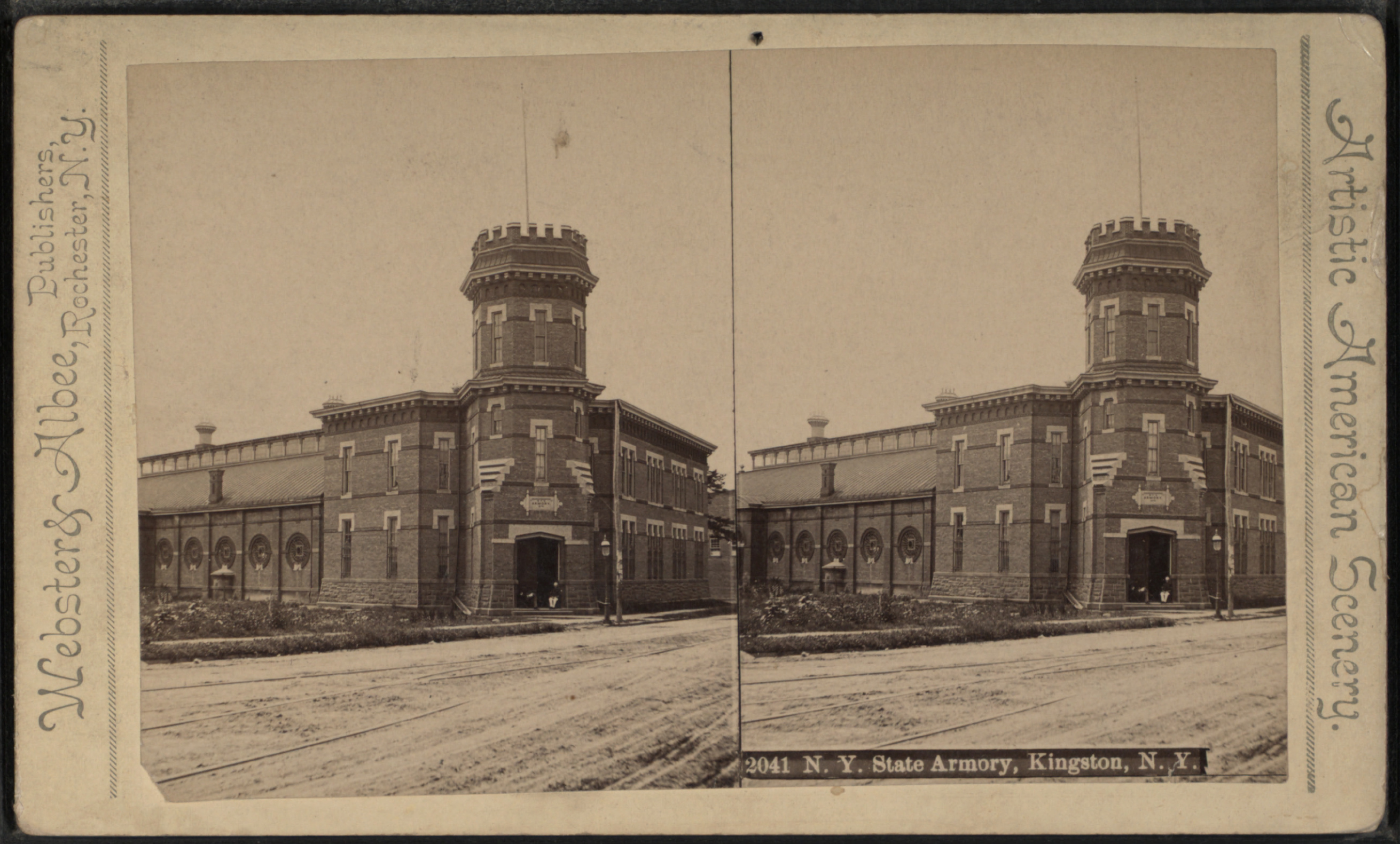
Stereoscopic image of Kingston, New York Armory building

The New York State armory building in Kingston, New York, now the Andy Murphy Midtown Neighborhood Center, is a historic 19th-century building designed by architect J. A. Wood.
