= Stuyvesant Hotel =

Historic hotel building that won awards

Coordinates: 41.93417°N 74.01907°W

Stuyvesant Hotel in Kingston, New York is a historic building constructed in 1910. Designed by J.A. Wood, it went through a restoration in the early 1990s. The restored Stuyvesant Hotel won awards from the First Honor Award from American Institute of Architects Westchester/Mid-Hudson Chapter, the Architecture for design excellence award from New York State Association of Architects, and the 1993 Affordable Housing Award.
