= Bill Chappell =

American politician

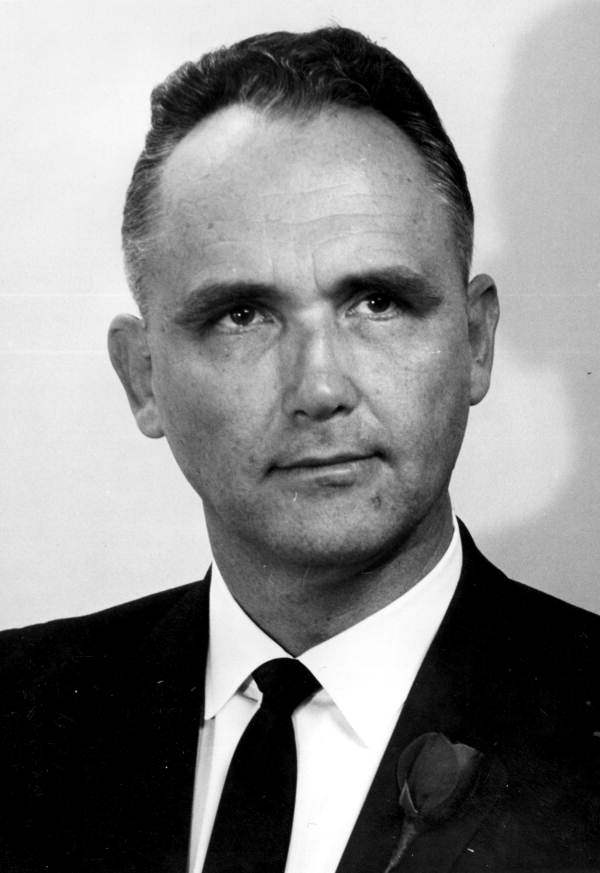

Member of the U.S. House of Representatives from Florida's 4th district
- In office January 3, 1969 – January 3, 1989
- Preceded by: Syd Herlong
- Succeeded by: Craig James

Speaker of the Florida House of Representatives
- In office April 4, 1961 – November 9, 1962
- Preceded by: Tom Beasley
- Succeeded by: Mallory Horne

Member of the Florida House of Representatives
- In office November 2, 1954 – November 3, 1964
- Preceded by: C. Farris Bryant
- Succeeded by: William G. O'Neill
- Constituency: Marion County
- In office November 8, 1966 – November 5, 1968
- Preceded by: William G. O'Neill
- Succeeded by: Buddy MacKay
- Constituency: Citrus, Hernando, Marion, and Sumter Counties (1966–67); 30th district (1967–68)

Personal details
- Born: William Venroe Chappell, Jr. February 3, 1922 Kendrick, Florida
- Died: March 30, 1989 (aged 67) Bethesda, Maryland
- Party: Democratic
- Spouse: Jeane Brown Chappell

Military service
- Allegiance: United States
- Branch/service: United States Navy
- Years of service: 1942–1946 (USN); 1946–1983 (USNR)
- Rank: Captain

William Venroe Chappell Jr. (February 3, 1922 – March 30, 1989) was an American World War II veteran and Democratic politician from Florida who served in the U.S. House of Representatives from 1969 to 1989.

== Early life, education and military service ==
Born in Kendrick, Florida, Chappell graduated from the University of Florida with a Bachelor of Arts in 1947 and a Bachelor of Laws in 1949. The Bachelor of Laws was exchanged for a Juris Doctor in 1967.

=== Military service ===
He served in the United States Navy, aviator from 1942 to 1946. He retired as a captain from United States Navy Reserve in 1983.

== Legal career and government service ==
Chappell began his legal career as a prosecuting attorney in Marion County from 1950 to 1954. He later was a member of the law firm of Chappell and Rowland in Ocala.

Chappell represented Marion County in the Florida House of Representatives from 1954 to 1964, and served as Speaker of the House from 1961 to 1963. He did not seek reelection in 1964 but was elected again in 1966 from a district encompassing Marion, Citrus, Hernando, and Sumter Counties.

=== Congressional career ===
When incumbent Congressman Syd Herlong retired in 1968, Chappell ran for and was elected to Florida's 4th congressional district. He was re-elected nine times.

Chappell was a moderate to conservative Democrat and served on the United States House Appropriations Committee. At the time of his defeat he was serving as chairman of the United States House Appropriations Subcommittee on Defense.

Chappell voted for the Abandoned Shipwrecks Act of 1987. The Act asserts United States title to certain abandoned shipwrecks located on or embedded in submerged lands under state jurisdiction, and transfers title to the respective state, thereby empowering states to manage these cultural and historical resources more efficiently, with the goal of preventing treasure hunters and salvagers from damaging them. President Ronald Reagan signed it into law on April 28, 1988.

He was defeated in the 1988 general election by Republican Craig James, losing narrowly 50.2–49.8%.

== Personal life and legacy ==
Chappell married the former Jeane Brown on September 28, 1985. He was a resident of Ocala, Florida, until his death in Bethesda, Maryland, on March 30, 1989, from bone cancer.

The Port Orange Causeway, spanning the Halifax River, in Port Orange, Florida, was named the Congressman William V. Chappell Jr. Memorial Bridge by the Florida Legislature in 1989.

The U.S. Department of Veterans Affairs Outpatient Clinic in Daytona Beach, Florida, was posthumously named after him.

U.S. House of Representatives
| Preceded by Syd Herlong | Member of the U.S. House of Representatives from Florida's 4th congressional district 1969–1989 | Succeeded by Craig James |
