= J. A. Wood =

American architect (1837–1910)

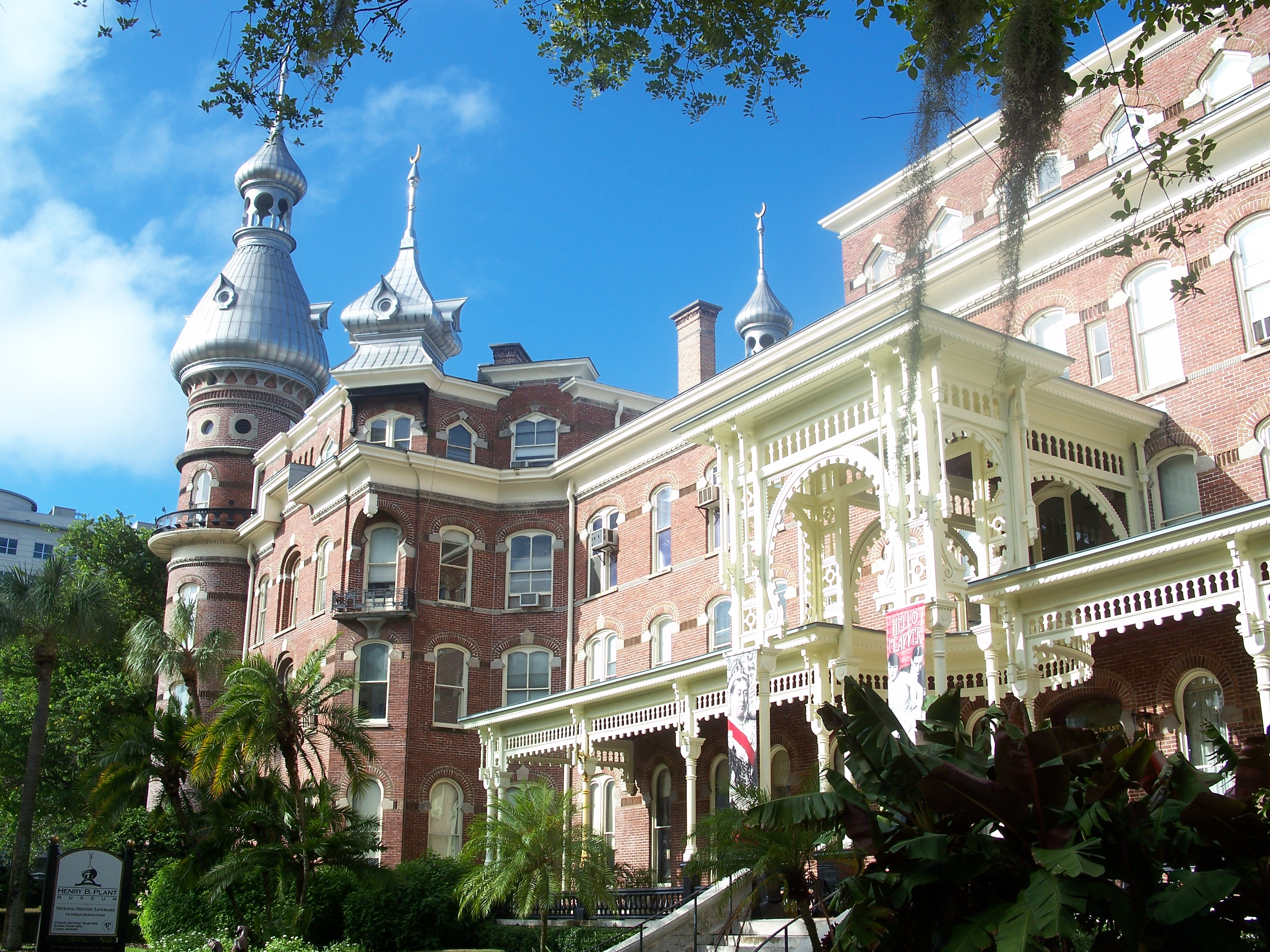
Tampa Bay Hotel exterior view

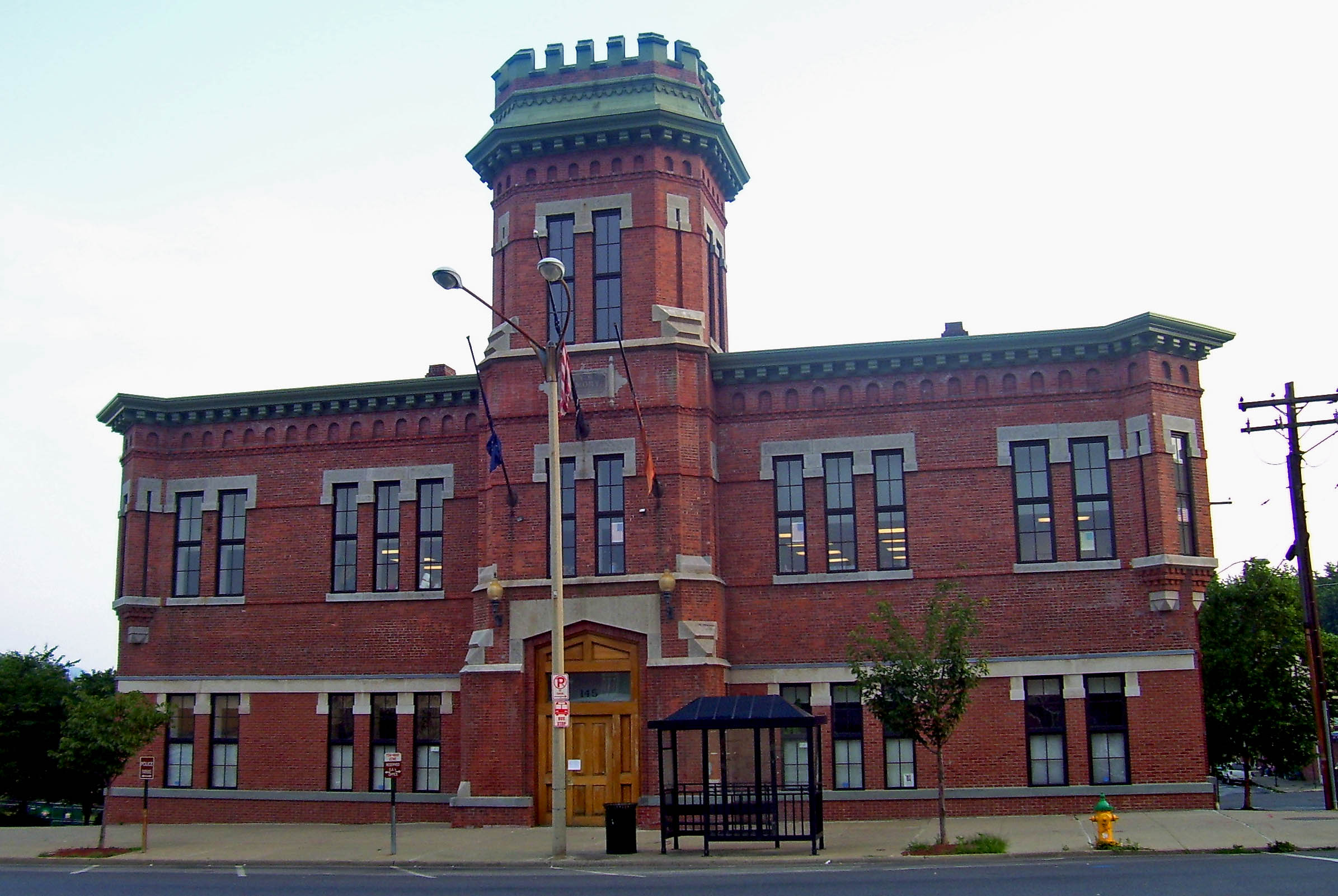
The New York State Armory building in Newburgh, New York now houses Orange County, New York's Social Services department, probation officers, and district attorney

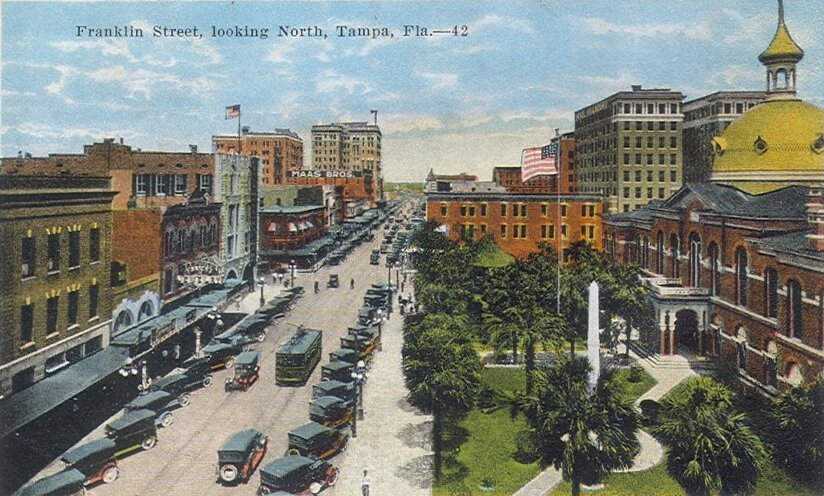
A view north along Franklin Street c. 1910s-1920s. The old Hillsborough County Courthouse (demolished in 1953) is pictured on the right

John A. Wood (June 11, 1837 – December 18, 1910), was an American architect . His work in upstate New York included projects in Poughkeepsie and Kingston, New York, as well as four armories, in Kingston, Newburgh, Bethel, and Watertown. His work in Tampa, Florida, includes the Tampa Bay Hotel and Old Hillsborough County Courthouse. His hotel work included the design of the Piney Woods Hotel, Oglethorpe Hotel, Mizzen Top Hotel, and Grand Hotel.

The Tampa Bay Hotel was listed on the National Historic Register in 1972.

== Biography ==
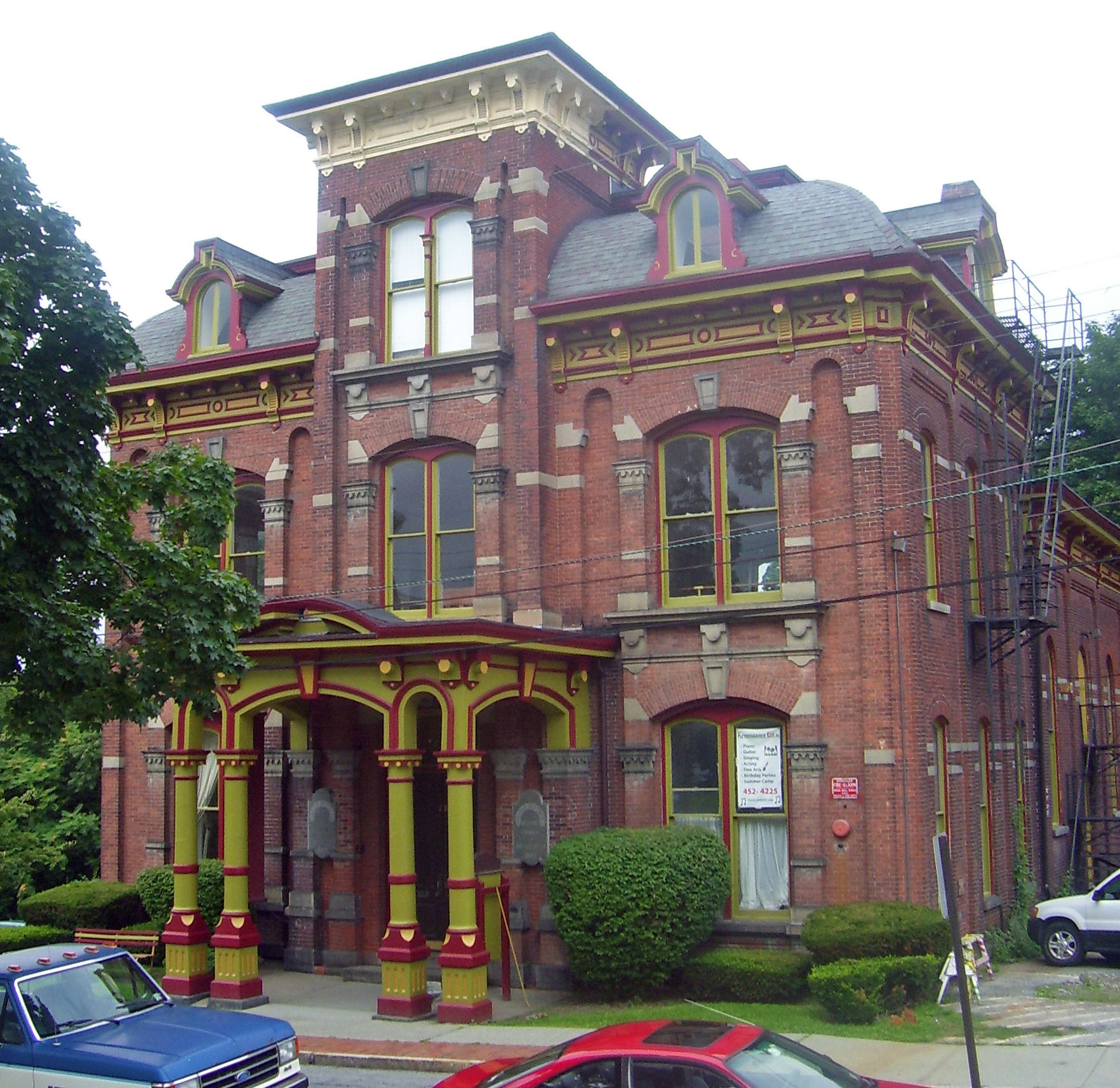
Vassar Institute in Poughkeepsie

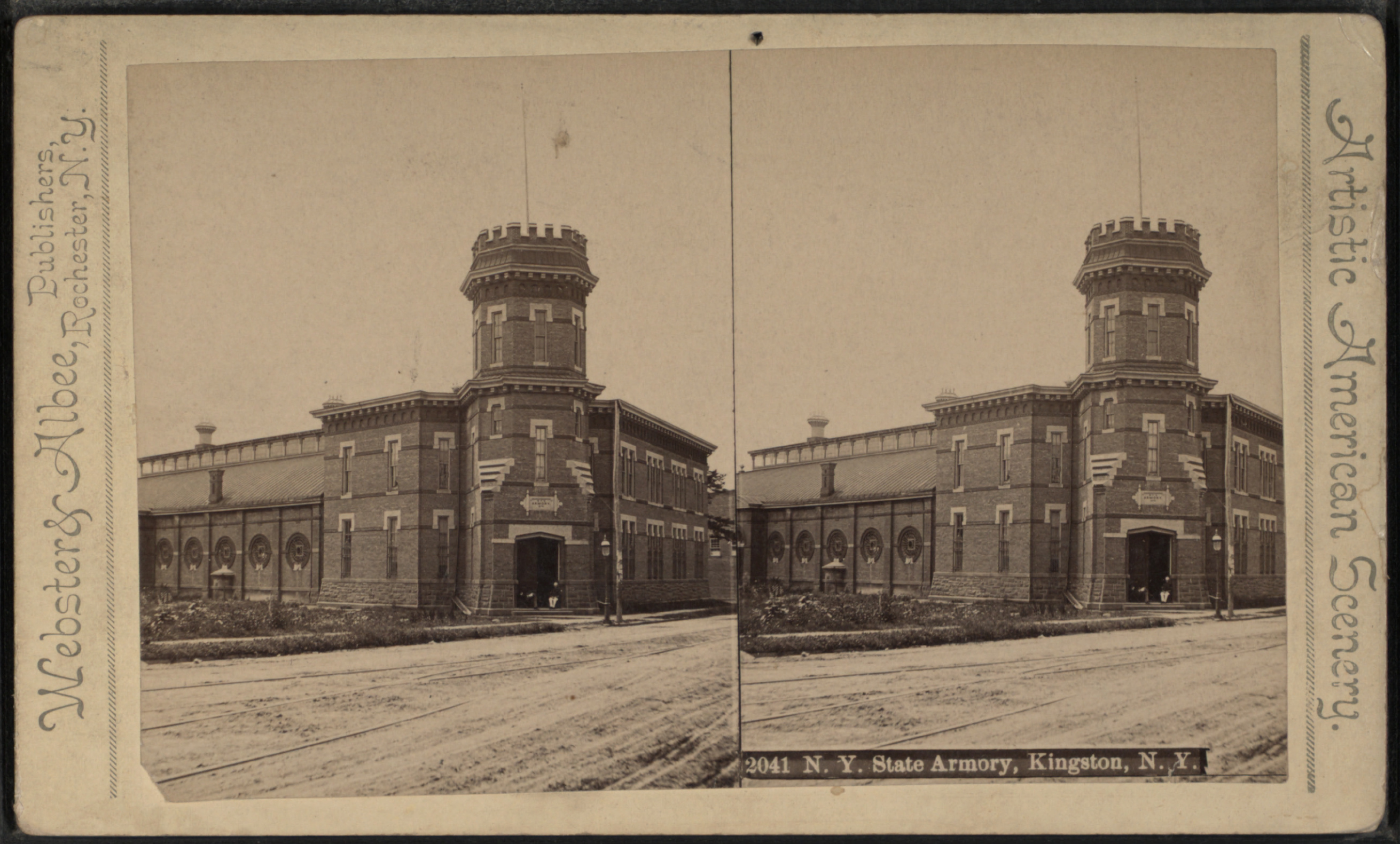
Stereoscopic image of Kingston, New York Armory building

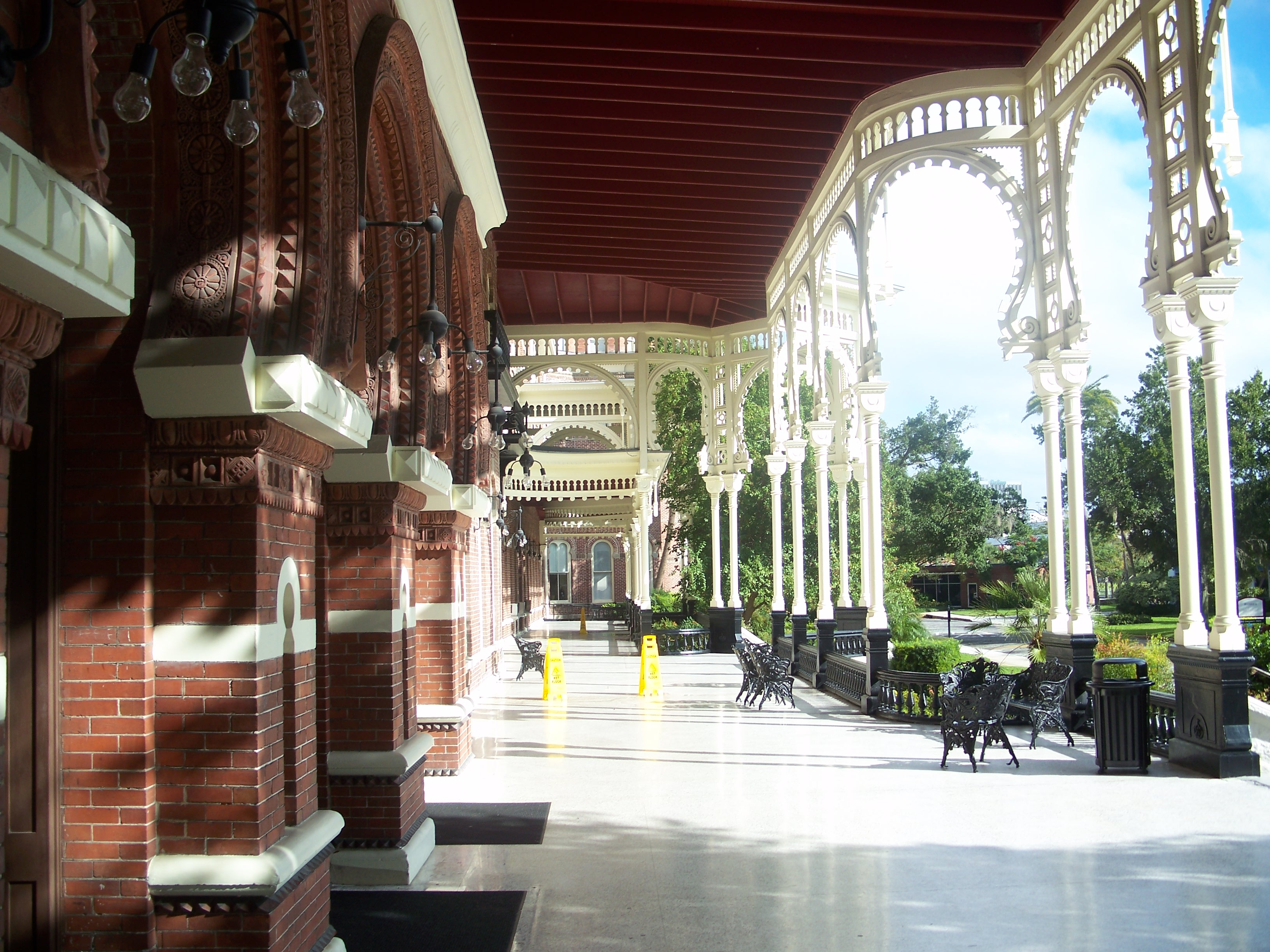
Architectural features of the Tampa Bay Hotel

Wood was born in Bethel, New York. He began his career in 1863 in Poughkeepsie before moving his office to 153 Broadway in New York City. He completed several projects in the area of Kingston, New York as well as in Brunswick, Georgia.

Wood's parents were Stephen C. Wood and Mary Crist Wood. Wood is buried in the Evergreen Cemetery in Bethel.

Wood established his practice in Poughkeepsie by 1863. The buildings he designed in the area include several on and around the Vassar College campus. He also did work in Kingston, including the New York State Armory (1878) and, at the end of his career, the Stuyvesant Hotel (1910). He also designed the Tremper House by Mount Tremper (constructed for wholesale grocery businessmen Thomas and Jacob Tremper), one of the earliest railroad resorts in the Catskill Mountains. It was located by the Phoenicia stop of the Ulster and Delaware Railroad.

Hotel design became his specialty and Wood achieved a reputation for his architectural style, especially his use of Moorish Revival style. The Tampa Bay Hotel is his most famous work, a striking five-storied, 511-room building with ornate Victorian architecture features (sometimes referred to as gingerbread), as well as Moorish architectural features including minarets, cupolas, and domes. The resort was built for Henry B. Plant, a railroad and shipping tycoon. It is now part of the University of Tampa campus and is known as Plant Hall. It contains the Henry B. Plant Museum.

Wood stated his dislike for Queen Anne style in the Thomasville Times in 1886: "Dear Sir – Please correct the statement in Saturday’s Times that the ‘Piney Woods Hotel is built in the Queen Anne style.’ Neither the Piney Woods nor any other hotel that I have ever designed is in that beastly style, which is at best no style at all."

The summer home of Effingham Brown Sutton in West Islip, New York (ca. 1870)consisted of a mansion and several fine cottages. The main house, Woodruff Sutton cottage, and gate house were razed by railroad magnate Edwin Hawley. The last original building, owned by George Nicholas in later years, was demolished in the 1950s.

Wood's design for the Grand Hotel (Highmount, New York) was a project for Thomas Cornell, owner of Hudson River steamships and the Ulster and Delaware Railroad. Cornell concluded that a hotel near the railroad would boost traffic and draw wealthy clients who would be hours away from Grand Central Station in New York City. The three-story hotel included elegant features such as turrets, and a covered piazza along its 350-foot length.

Wood's design for a large hotel in Charleston, South Carolina was covered by The New York Times in a January 6, 1894 article.

== List of works ==
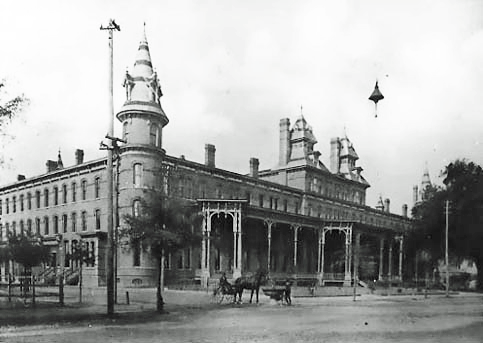
Oglethorpe Hotel in 1892

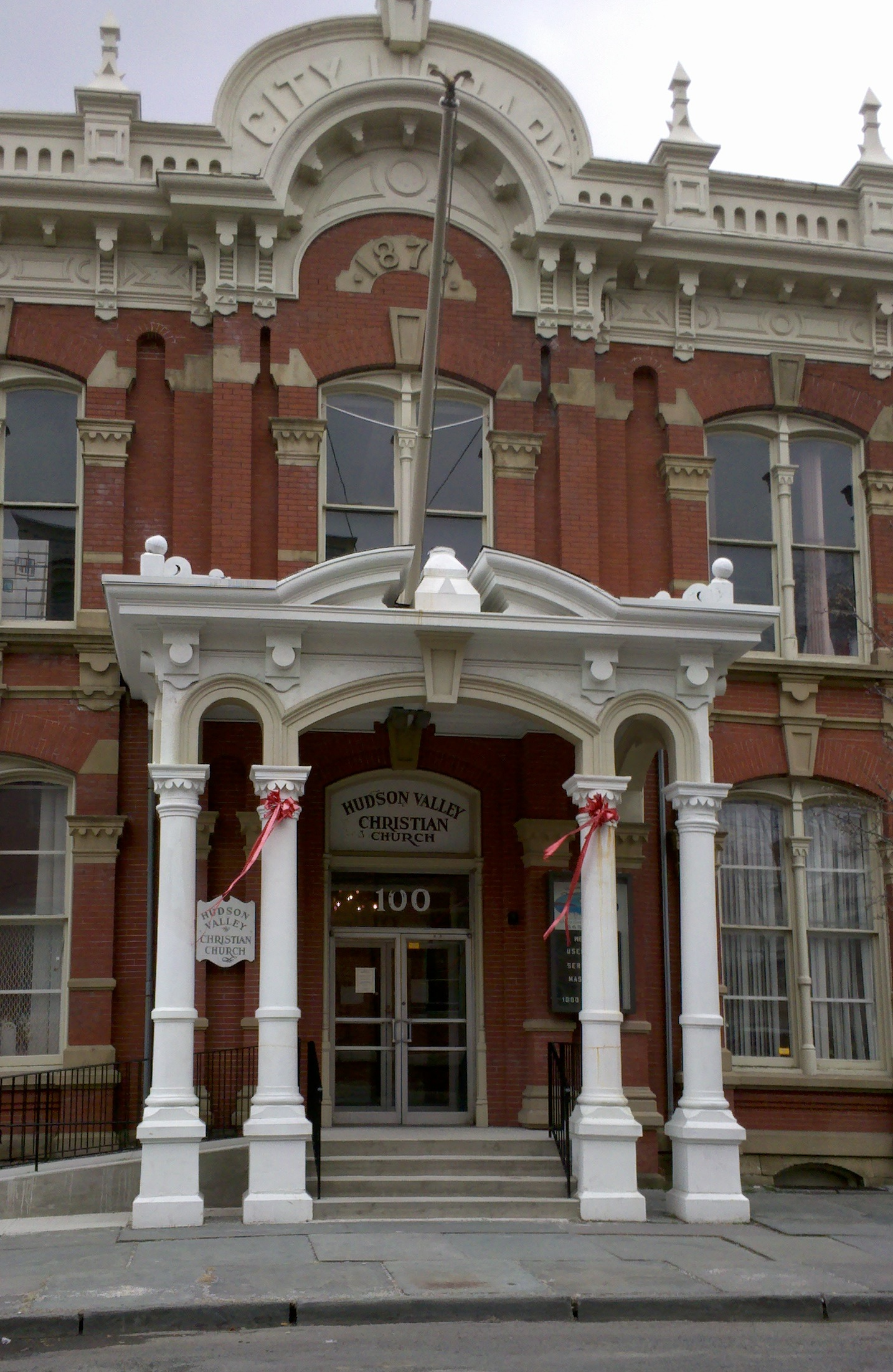
Newburgh Free Library

- Bardavon Opera House (1869), Poughkeepsie, New York
- Kingston City Almshouse (1874), Kingston, New York
- Kingston Argus Building (1874, demolished), Kingston, New York
- Newburgh Free Library (1875), Newburgh, New York
- New York State Armory (1878), Kingston, New York
- Watertown Armory (1879), Watertown, New York (demolished 1966)
- New York State Armory (1880), Newburgh, New York
- Mizzen Top Hotel (1880)
- 687-691 Broadway / 250-254 Mercer Street, New York City (1885–88)
- Oglethorpe Hotel (1888), Brunswick, Georgia
- Tampa Bay Hotel (1891), Tampa, Florida
- Old Hillsborough County Courthouse (1892, demolished 1953)
- Grand Hotel in Highmount, New York (1881)
- Piney Woods Hotel, Thomasville, Georgia
- Mahoney-McGarvey House at 1709 Reynolds Street in Brunswick, Georgia
- Poughkeepsie Rural Cemetery gates and gatehouse
- Vassar Brothers Institute, Poughkeepsie, New York
- Vassar Home for Aged Men, Poughkeepsie, New York
- Poughkeepsie Alms House, Poughkeepsie, New York
- Calisthenium and Riding Academy, Poughkeepsie, New York
- Akin Free Library, Pawling, New York (1908)
- Stuyvesant Hotel in Kingston, New York (1910)
