= Grand Hotel (Highmount, New York) =

Coordinates: 42.15071°N 74.487863°W

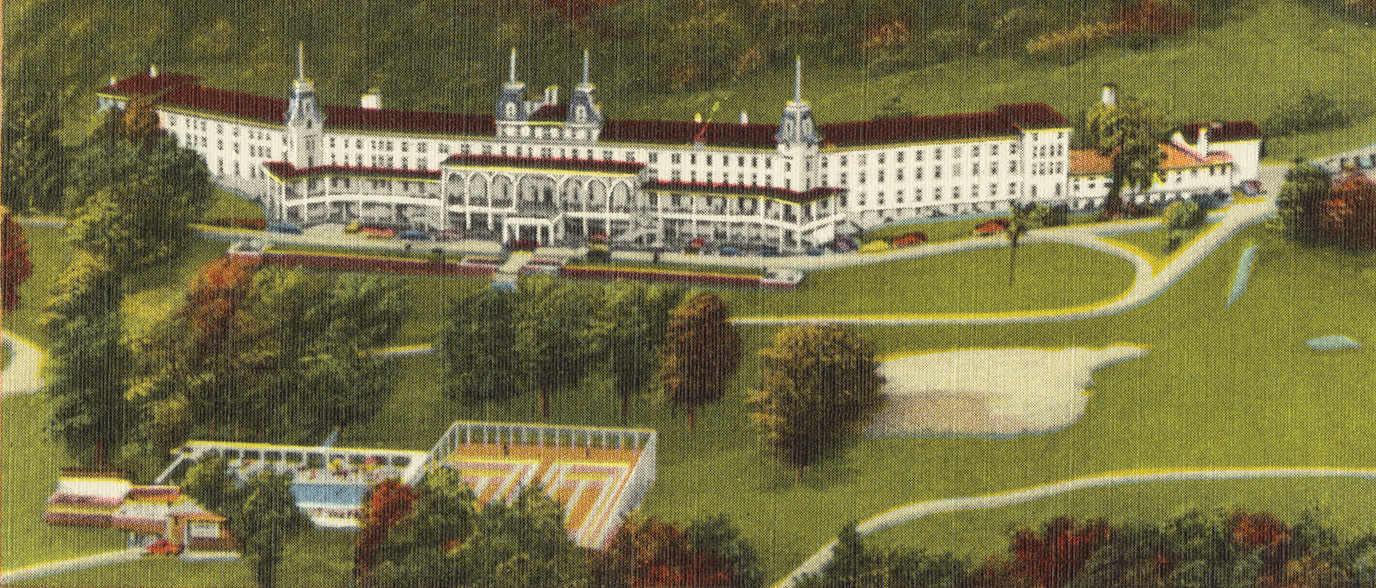
- Depiction of the Grand Hotel, Highmount, N. Y. on a postcard
- Interactive map of the Grand Hotel area

General information
- Status: closed
- Location: Highmount, New York, United States
- Opened: 1881
- Closed: 1966

Design and construction
- Architect: J. A. Wood

Other information
- Number of rooms: 418 guest rooms

The Grand Hotel was a hotel located in Highmount, New York. It was built by the Ulster and Delaware Railroad in 1881 and closed in 1966. J. A. Wood was the building's architect.

Sitting on the side of Monka Hill, it had 418 rooms overlooking the Big Indian Valley towards Slide Mountain.
