= Craig James (politician) =

American politician

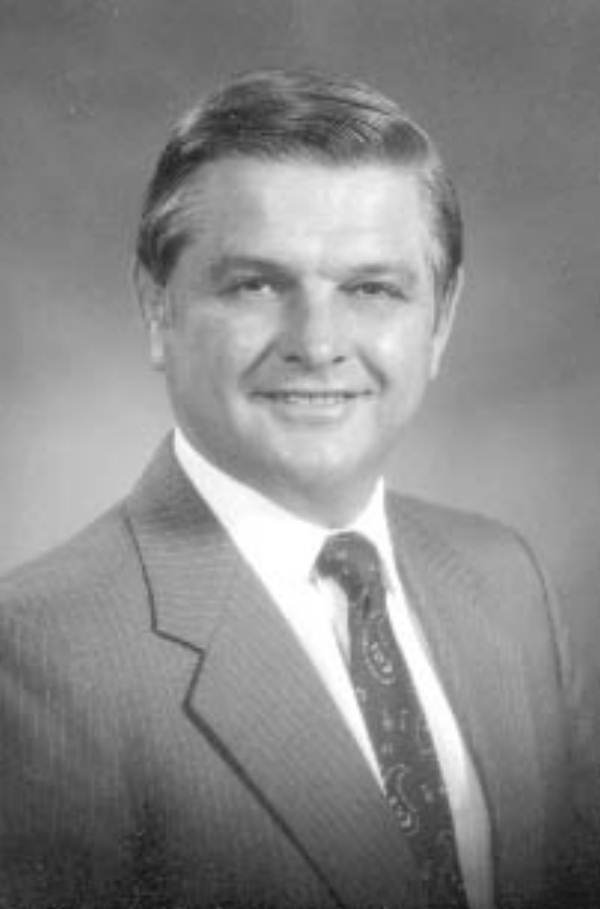

Member of the U.S. House of Representatives from Florida's 4th district
- In office January 3, 1989 – January 3, 1993
- Preceded by: Bill Chappell
- Succeeded by: Tillie Fowler

Personal details
- Born: Craig Taylor James; May 5, 1941 (age 85) Augusta, Georgia, U.S.
- Party: Republican
- Education: University of Florida (AA); Stetson University (BS, JD)

Craig Taylor James (born May 5, 1941) is an American politician and lawyer from Florida. He served two terms in the United States Congress representing Florida's 4th Congressional district from 1989 to 1993.

== Early life and career ==
James was born in Augusta, Richmond County, Georgia on May 5, 1941. He graduated from DeLand High School in DeLand, Florida in 1959. He graduated from the University of Florida with an Associate of Arts in 1961. He graduated from Stetson University with a Bachelor of Science in 1963 and Juris Doctor in 1967.

=== Military service ===
From 1963 to 1969 he served in United States Army National Guard and United States Army Reserve.

=== Early career ===
He practiced law in DeLand from 1967 to 1971. From 1971 to 1975 he served as Commissioner of the DeLand Housing Authority.

== Congress ==
First elected to Congress in 1988, James served two terms from 1989 to 1993, as a Republican he represented the Florida's 4th congressional district in Congress. Following reappointment of the state’s congressional seats, he did not seek reelection in 1992 and continued to practice law in DeLand.

== Later career ==
Currently he resides in DeLand, Florida. He is a partner and founding member of James & Zimmerman, P.L. in DeLand.

U.S. House of Representatives
Preceded by Bill Chappell	Member of the U.S. House of Representatives from Florida's 4th congressional district 1989–1993	Succeeded by Tillie Fowler
U.S. order of precedence (ceremonial)
Preceded by Bill Grant as Former U.S. Representative	Order of precedence of the United States as Former U.S. Representative	Succeeded by Jim Bacchus as Former U.S. Representative
