= Poughkeepsie Almshouse and City Infirmary =

- U.S. National Register of Historic Places
- Location within New York Location within the United States
- Location: 20 Maple St., Poughkeepsie, New York
- Coordinates: 41°42′2″N 73°54′45″W
- Area: 7 acres (2.8 ha)
- Built: 1868
- Architect: J.A. Wood
- Architectural style: Colonial Revival, Italianate
- NRHP reference No.: 78001849
- Added to NRHP: December 4, 1978

Poughkeepsie Almshouse and City Infirmary is a historic almshouse and infirmary complex located at Poughkeepsie, Dutchess County, New York. The complex includes five contributing buildings. The almshouse buildings has a three-story, seven-bay, main block flanked by matching two-story, five-bay, wings. It was built in 1868 of brick with wood trim and features Italianate style details. J.A. Wood is credited as the building's architect. The City Infirmary building was built in 1907 and enlarged in 1936. It is a two-story brick and stone building and features a two-story, flat roofed, semi-circular entrance portico. The infirmary closed in 1972. Also on the property are a carriage house, barn, laundry building, combination barn / ice house, and shed. It has been adaptively reused as a satellite campus for Adelphi University.

It was added to the National Register of Historic Places in 1978.
