= Oglethorpe Hotel =

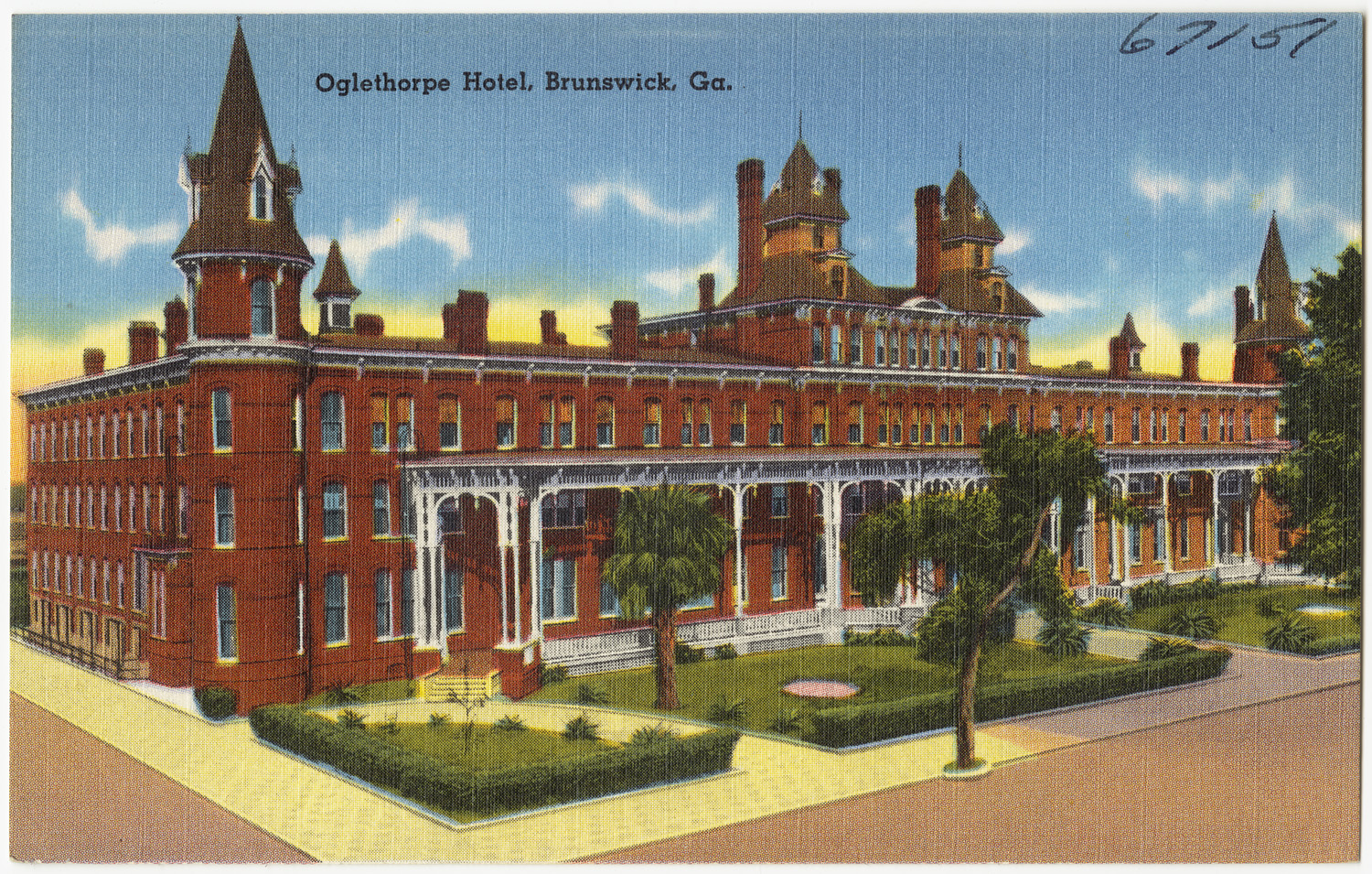
Oglethorpe Hotel postcard depicting the front of the hotel

The Oglethorpe Hotel, located in downtown Brunswick, Georgia, was designed in 1888 by architect J. A. Wood and named after James Oglethorpe. It was built on top of the previous Oglethorpe House, which was burned during the Civil War. It was constructed of brick and had three main levels. The building was capped by conical towers at the corners and in the center.

In Brunswick, Wood would go on to design the Mahoney-McGarvey House in 1891 continuing his Carpenter Gothic style of design. For the town of Brunswick, the Oglethorpe was a constant source of celebration and pride in southern traditions and values. It was built during a time of growing economic prosperity and increasing profits from global naval stores exports. The hotel remained in operation until 1958 when it was torn down and replaced with a Holiday Inn. Eventually the Holiday Inn would fall too and the empty lot in Brunswick's downtown would be called the "Oglethorpe Block."

== History ==
=== Grand opening ===
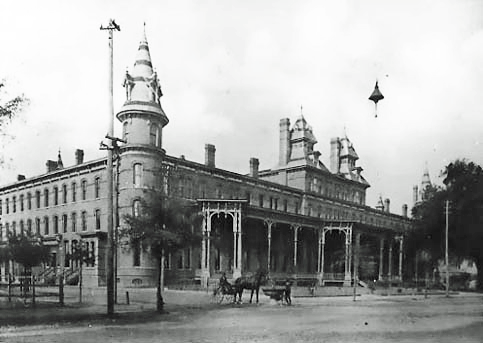
The Oglethorpe Hotel of the 1890s

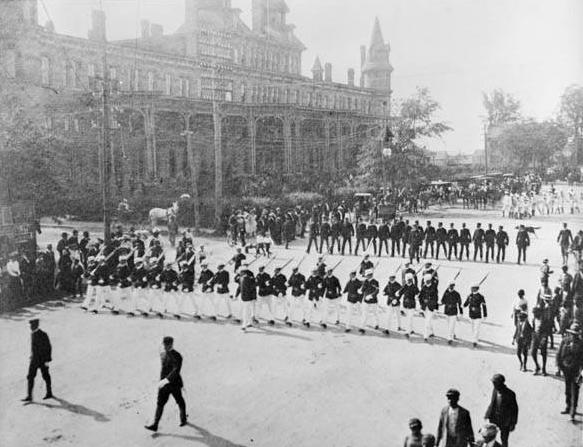
Confederate Memorial Day April 26, 1903

On January 9, 1888 the Oglethorpe Hotel invited the city to see its grand opening. It opened to great fanfare as the city both economically benefitted from a luxury hotel for winter tourists and socially benefitted from a grand monument to the city's achievement. A newspaper report of the opening reads, "... all Brunswick's friends, well wishers, acquaintances and enemies as well as the world at large to come and see the house that we have built, and the prettiest and most prosperous town that the sun ever shown upon—'BRUNSWICK, THE CITY BY THE SEA'". The hotel represented the city's growing power and ability to invest in itself. Throughout the 1890s the hotel was installed with electricity and certain stairwells changed carpet.

=== Growing notoriety ===
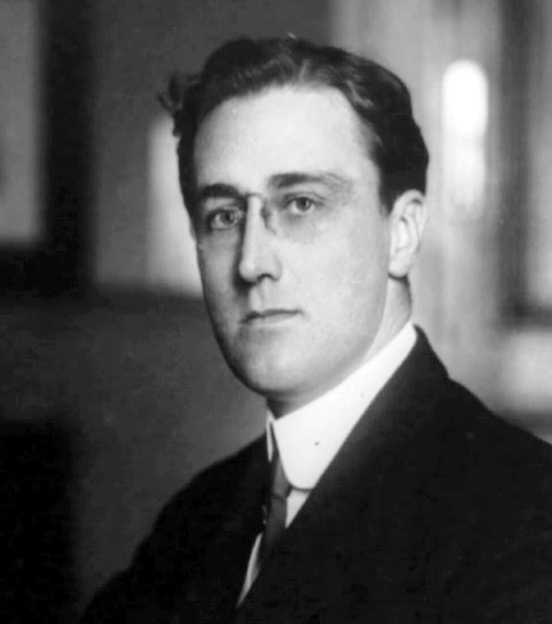
Roosevelt in 1913

The hotel grew to be a part of the city's culture and it became one of Brunswick's identifiable landmarks. The celebrations and dances it held are often pointed to as a shining beacon in times of hardship. The social life of the city began to center around the Oglethorpe. Many of the city's important political meetings and dinners were held in the hotel's grand dining halls. However, the hotel was also used by many elite as a stop to Jekyll Island, some include J. P. Morgan, Joseph Pulitzer, William K. Vanderbilt, and William Rockefeller; they were able to use the proximity of both a train station and a harbor in order to avoid public attention.

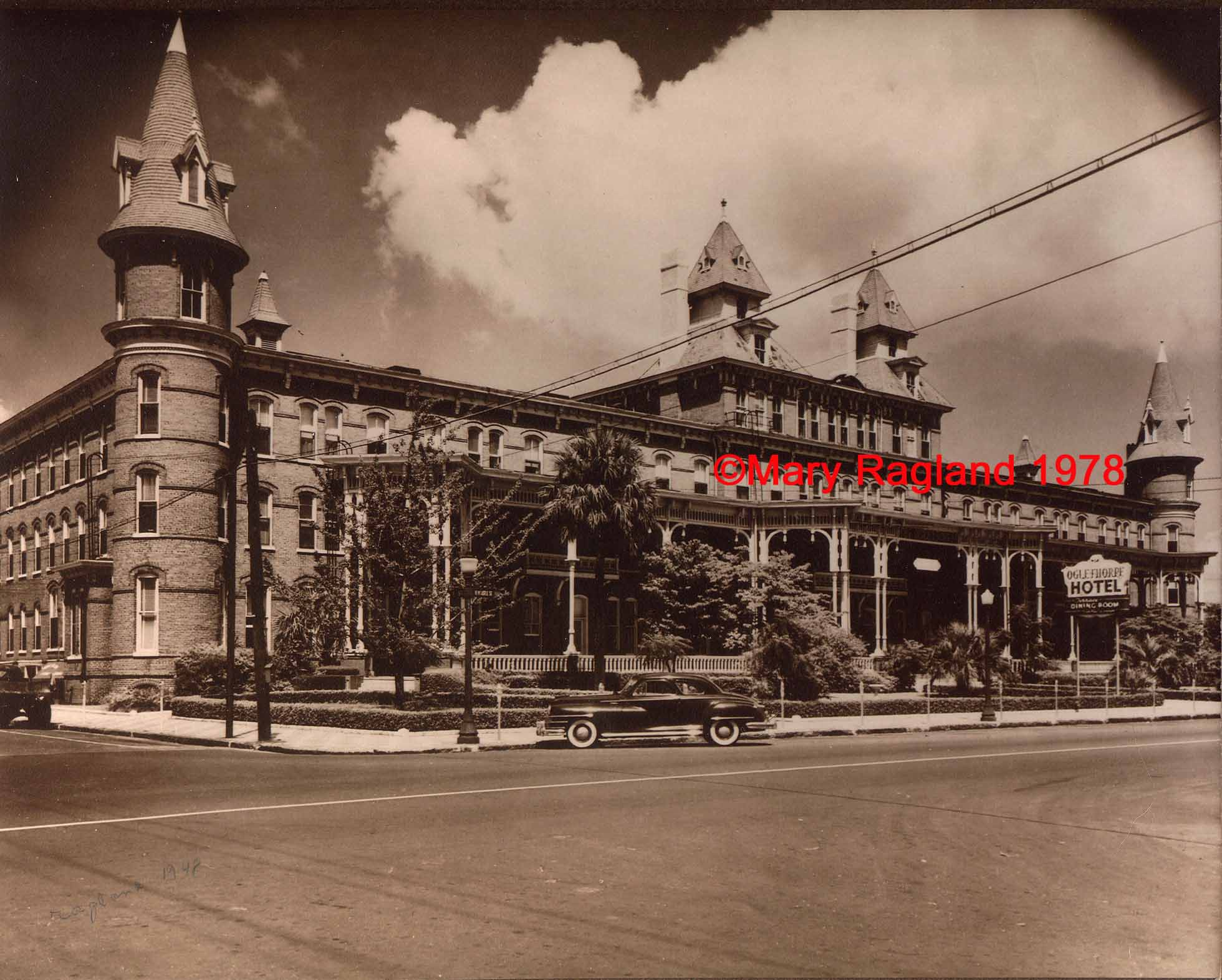
The Oglethorpe Hotel of the 1940s

In 1913 Franklin Roosevelt dined in the Oglethorpe Hotel. He was an assistant secretary to the navy looking for a location to house small vessels on the Southern Atlantic coast. His wife and cousin accompanied him for a one night stay at the Oglethorpe Hotel. In 1925 he recalls of the event, "Brunswick, I remember chiefly, for the possum banquet they gave me-every known variety of possum- cooked in every known variety of style. I had them all."

In the 1950s the movie The View from Pompey's Head was filmed in the Brunswick area. Many of the movie's shots were taken around the hotel and Jekyll Island. The star of the film, Richard Egan even celebrated the premier in the city of Brunswick, visiting the Oglethorpe as well as local theaters. However, despite this the hotel was beginning to face hardship. Damage from the moist coastal air began to take its toll on the structure and larger structural damages began threatening the hotel's existence.

=== Eventual decline ===
In 1958 the fatal accident was a boiler in the hotel's basement bursting. This was due to blockages from pipes gradually becoming clogged over years of use. Without any money to repair the significant damages to the hotel, the owners were forced to close its doors. Plans for tearing down the hotel and building a more modern one were met with public outcry. When it became clear that the hotel was to be demolished hundreds of people poured in to collect everything they could. Thousands of pieces of memorabilia, the safe, the colored tiling, anything that could be removed and carried away before the demolition began was saved.

With the loss of the Oglethorpe many within the town rushed to save its memory. The eventual construction of the Holiday Inn was met with major public criticism. Many found the new building to lack the grandiosity and culture the original Oglethorpe embodied. As the surrounding downtown area fell into financial decline, eventually the Holiday Inn meet the same fate, with most of it demolished except for a small section turned into a JCPenney.

=== Today ===
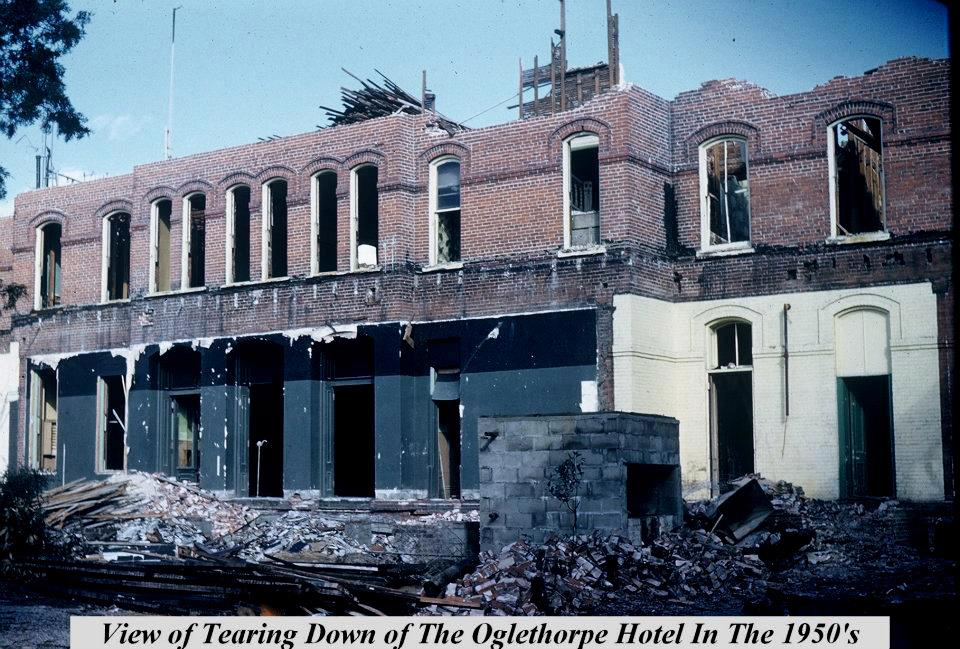
The Oglethorpe mid-deconstruction

Today, the JCPenney has closed down and is a locally owned antique store. The remaining land is undeveloped and empty, with the local nickname "The Oglethorpe Block". There are strong communities and historical societies collecting and documenting the history and what pieces remain. Many locals still collect and share various items or documents that have survived the passage of time. Modern restoration efforts have created a small park dedicated to the Oglethorpe in one of Brunswick's downtown squares. Tiles from the original flooring in the Oglethorpe now reside alongside plaques describing its importance to the growth of Brunswick.

== Memorabilia ==
=== The safe ===
The safe the hotel used before its demolition has been recovered and is currently used by an anonymous person in Brunswick. It was originally saved by S. Hadley Brown who bought it empty with a broken locking mechanism. He stored it within a warehouse for nearly a decade, before it came to its current owner. The two men met because today's owner delivered papers for Mr. Brown, and they developed a closer relationship by delivering his papers quietly for a small tip. Eventually urban development required the warehouse be demolished and replaced; Mr. Brown having no intention of keeping the safe, offered to pay today's owner to move the safe to the dump. Not wanting to lose the piece of history associated with the safe, he instead chose to take the safe as payment for moving it. The safe has had its internal mechanisms repaired by a locksmith and is currently used as a pantry in the current owner's home. On the inside panels of the panels of the safe are painted frescoes, and the casters have New York, New York engraved on them.

== Layout ==
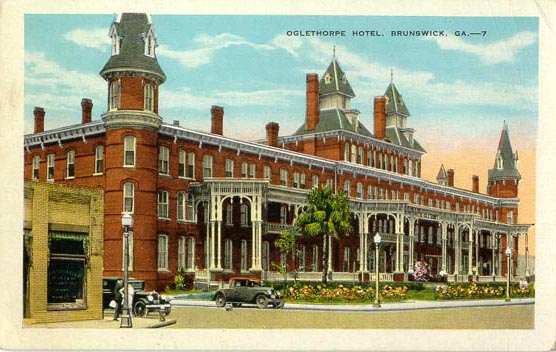
Side View of the Oglethorpe

The Oglethorpe was 267 feet (81 m) wide with 140 foot (43 m) long wings on either side. The front porch was 240 feet (73 m) across the front, with the rest being dedicated to the rising towers on either side. The first floor entered through double doors into a grand rotunda with pink, grey, and white marble tiling. The end opposite the entrance opened into a balcony that overlooked the courtyard behind the hotel and the bay. On the left and right sides were steam heated hallways that led to various rooms.

=== The wings ===
On the left wing was the dining room, breakfast room, and kitchens. The great dining hall could sit 300 guests and was floored in wood and marble tile. On the right wing were various rooms of different sizes and purposes. The biggest one was the parlor, carpeted in Moquette and connected to reception and dressing rooms; there were also billiards rooms, smoking rooms, and reading rooms. The rotunda also connected to furnished offices for hotel use and a staircase to the higher floors.

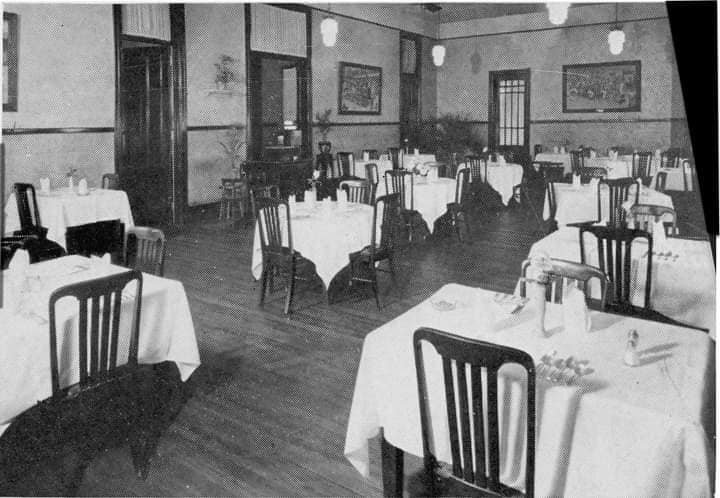
Dining Room

=== Guest rooms ===
The second and third floors were used for guest apartments. There were a variety of room sizes that offered different experiences. The rooms were furnished uniquely and contained a view of the harbor or local downtown. Each room was outfitted with a fireplace for heating and mantels of different quality. Plumbing ran throughout the building and electricity soon replaced the initial gas power. Rooms that were connected could be used to join larger families in one continuous room.

=== Water ===
Every floor contained firefighting equipment, including a hose that could pump 375 gallons of water per minute. The elevator was a water balance elevator that worked using large vessels of waters and pumps and was operated at all times. A local artisan well and duplex pump supplied the hotel with water by storing it within a reservoir.

=== Outside the hotel ===
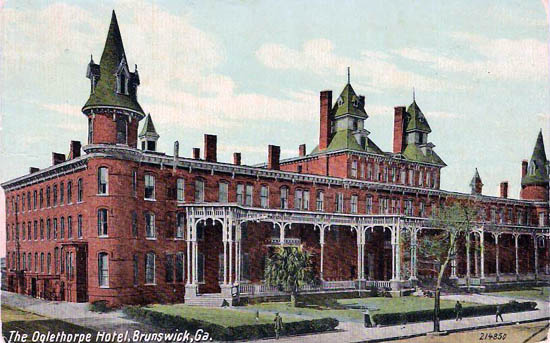
Oglethorpe Hotel Postcard

Within the courtyard, between the wings, was a park of various tropical fruit trees, palmettos, shrubs, and a water fountain. There was also a train station that allowed for easy transportation of tourists and supplies to the hotel. A livery and stable provided horses for guests to ride around local parks.
