= Old Hillsborough County Courthouse =

Coordinates: 27.94846°N 82.45652°W

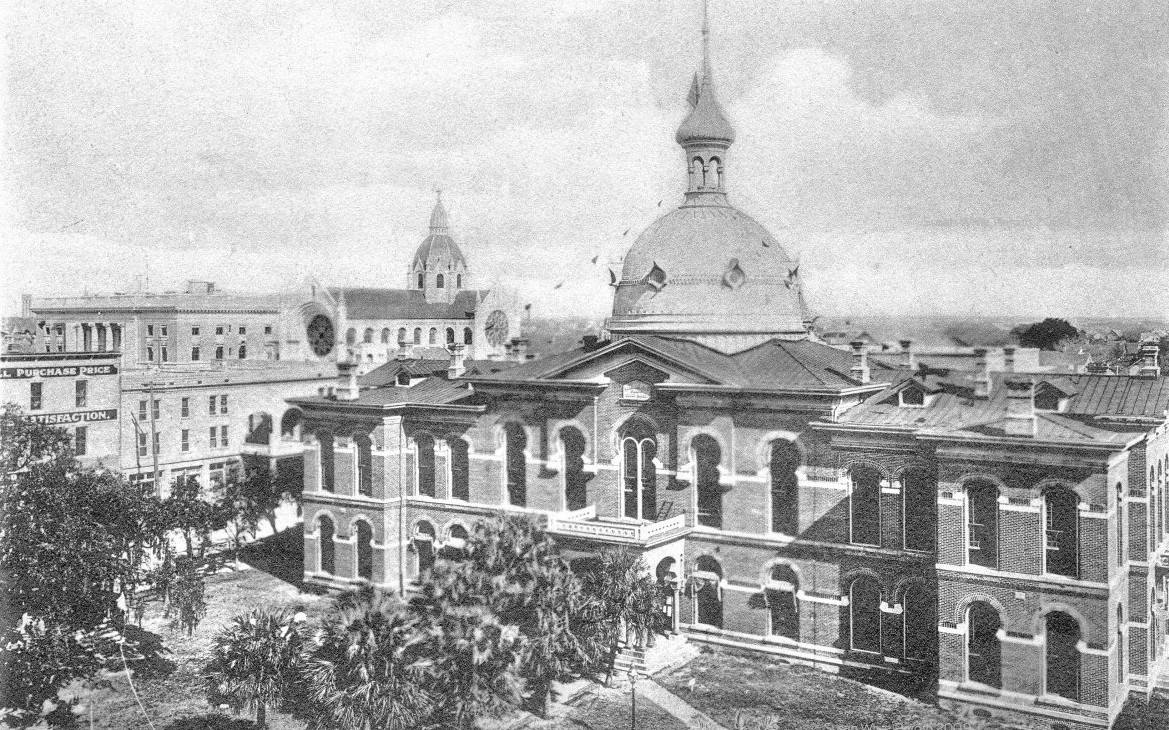
The old courthouse from Franklin Street, c. 1908.

The Hillsborough County Courthouse was constructed in 1892 in the block bounded by Madison Street, Lafayette Street (now Kennedy Boulevard), Florida Avenue, and Franklin Street. This replaced an older courthouse in the same place. Designed by John A. Wood, it included some of the Moorish architectural styles and domes similar to the Tampa Bay Hotel, which was also designed by Wood, across the Hillsborough River. It was demolished in 1953 and replaced with the current Hillsborough County Courthouse, four blocks to the east.

== Gallery ==
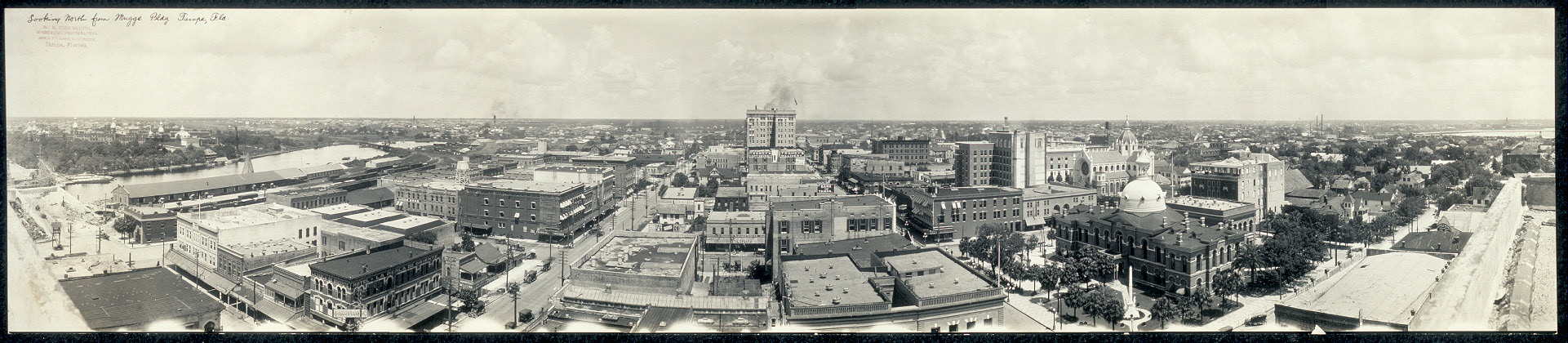
Panorama of Downtown Tampa taken in 1913 showing the old Hillsborough county Courthouse on right.

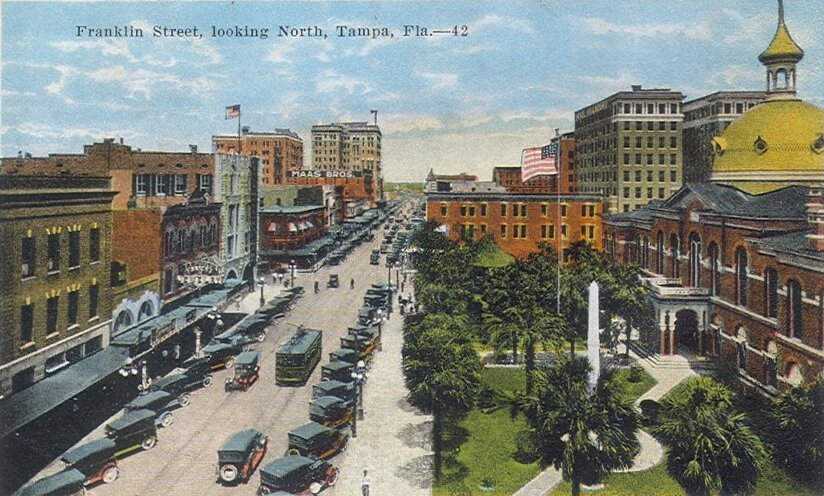
A view north along Franklin Street in 1922. The old Hillsborough County Courthouse is pictured on the right. A Confederate Monument is located in front of the courthouse, on the lower right.

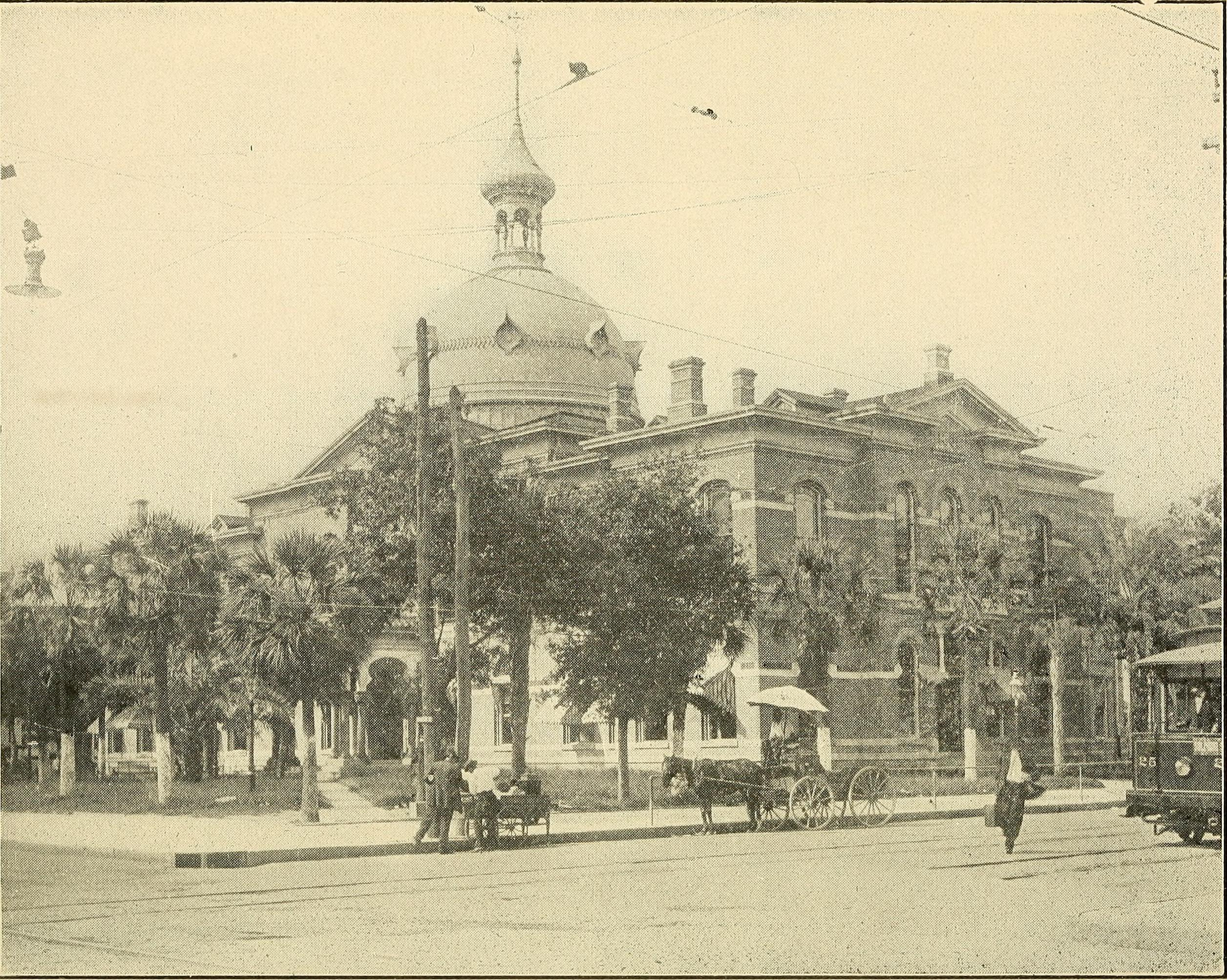
The Courthouse in 1915.
