= William H. Kendrick =

American politician (c.1822–1901)

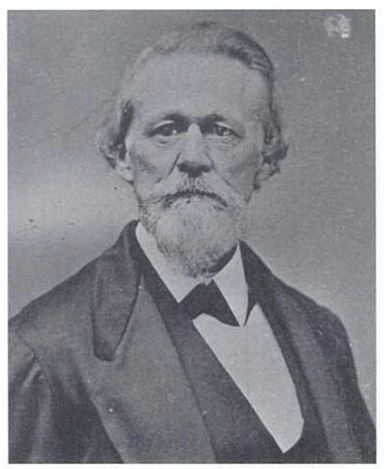
- Born: 1822; Hamilton County, Florida
- Died: November 26, 1901; Jacksonville, Florida
- Spouse(s): Mary Gibbons; Martha E. Johnston
- Military career
- Allegiance: United States of America; Confederate States of America
- Branch: United States Army; Confederate States Army
- Service years: 1855, 1861, 1864
- Rank: Captain
- Units: 10th Florida Infantry, Co. E
- Conflicts: Seminole Wars American Civil War: Battle of Olustee

William H. Kendrick (c. 1822 – 1901) known as Captain Bill Kendrick was a soldier, state senator, pioneer and lecturer in Florida. One obituary referred to him as "the original Florida cracker" Kendrick, Florida is named for him. He is also credited with naming Orlando.

== Biography ==
He fought in the Seminole Wars and was present at the capture of Osceola. He once lived in the "White House" plantation just north of Dade City. He was involved in a land dispute.

He also fought for the Confederacy in the Civil War and was at the Battle of Olustee.

He was a member of the Florida State Senate for two terms, retiring from politics in 1876 to devote his time to the real estate business. In 1870, he was involved in an aquatic plant propagating company that planned to build a canal. In 1880, he discovered the phosphate deposits in the Bone Valley region, a key moment in the economic history of the region.

His father James came from Georgia and fought in the War of 1812. His brother Edward Tatnall "Tat" Kendrick commanded a company in the Third Seminole War, served as sheriff of Hillsborough County, and sheriff of Polk County during the Civil War. He died in the war. "Tat"'s son William was a contractor who laid the first brick in Tampa, and constructed the Old Hillsborough County Courthouse. His sister Emily married William Spencer, who was Hillsborough County sheriff during the Civil War, and the father-in-law of W. B. Henderson and Henry L. Mitchell.

He was known as a great story-teller and traveled the state recounting tales. He died in Jacksonville.
