= National Register of Historic Places listings in Poughkeepsie, New York =

Location of the Town of Poughkeepsie (red) in New York; it surrounds the City of Poughkeepsie (gray), which is also included in this listing.

The following properties and districts are listed on the National Register of Historic Places in the city and town of Poughkeepsie, New York, including the hamlet of New Hamburg. The locations of National Register properties and districts (at least for all showing latitude and longitude coordinates below) may be seen in an online map by clicking on "Map of all coordinates".

Numerous properties were listed as result of a 1980 study of historic resources in Poughkeepsie, which nominated 59 historic districts and individual properties. One that was nominated but not listed, due to owner objection, was the Innis Dye Works.

This National Park Service list is complete through NPS recent listings posted November 13, 2026.

Contents: Counties in New York
Albany (Albany) – Allegany – Bronx – Broome – Cattaraugus – Cayuga – Chautauqua – Chemung – Chenango – Clinton – Columbia – Cortland – Delaware – Dutchess (Poughkeepsie, Rhinebeck) – Erie (Buffalo) – Essex – Franklin – Fulton – Genesee – Greene – Hamilton – Herkimer – Jefferson – Kings – Lewis – Livingston – Madison – Monroe (Rochester) – Montgomery – Nassau – New York (Below 14th Street, 14th to 59th Streets, 59th to 110th Streets, Above 110th Street, Islands) – Niagara (Niagara Falls) – Oneida – Onondaga (Syracuse) – Ontario – Orange – Orleans – Oswego – Otsego – Putnam – Queens – Rensselaer – Richmond – Rockland – St. Lawrence – Saratoga – Schenectady – Schoharie – Schuyler – Seneca – Steuben – Suffolk – Sullivan – Tioga – Tompkins – Ulster – Warren – Washington – Wayne – Westchester (Northern, Southern, New Rochelle, Peekskill, Yonkers) – Wyoming – Yates

== Current listings ==
	Name on the Register	Image	Date listed	Location	City or town	Description
1	Academy Street Historic District	Academy Street Historic District	November 26, 1982 (#82001117)	Academy St. between Livingston and Montgomery Sts. 41°41′44″N 73°55′44″W	Poughkeepsie	First planned neighborhood in city; many Victorian-era homes.
2	Adriance Memorial Library	Adriance Memorial Library	November 26, 1982 (#82001118)	93 Market St. 41°42′01″N 73°55′52″W	Poughkeepsie	City's first library building in 1897
3	Amrita Club	Amrita Club	November 26, 1982 (#82001119)	170 Church St. 41°42′06″N 73°55′48″W	Poughkeepsie	Home of city's most prestigious club, built in 1922, is one of only two brick Colonial Revival non-residential buildings in city
4	F.R. Bain House	F.R. Bain House	February 2, 2016 (#15001023)	57 Montgomery St. 41°41′58″N 73°55′48″W	Poughkeepsie	Intact Queen Anne house built for local developer in 1888
5	Balding Avenue Historic District	Balding Avenue Historic District	November 26, 1982 (#82001120)	Balding Ave. between Mansion and Marshall Sts. 41°42′29″N 73°55′37″W	Poughkeepsie	Late 19th century middle-class neighborhood just north of downtown
6	Barrett House	Barrett House	November 26, 1982 (#82001122)	55 Noxon St. 41°42′02″N 73°55′41″W	Poughkeepsie	1835 Greek Revival home which belonged to local artist, Thomas Barrett. Now a local arts center bearing his name.
7	O. H. Booth Hose Company	O. H. Booth Hose Company	November 26, 1982 (#82001123)	532 Main St. 41°42′04″N 73°55′04″W	Poughkeepsie	Second-story arched window is unusual in 1908 firehouse
8	Boughton/Haight House	Boughton/Haight House	November 26, 1982 (#82001124)	73-75 S. Hamilton St. 41°41′53″N 73°55′34″W	Poughkeepsie	
9	Abraham Brower House	Abraham Brower House	February 27, 1987 (#87000116)	2 Water St. 41°35′21″N 73°57′00″W	New Hamburg	Intact vernacular Greek Revival mid-19th century home of early resident
10	Adolph Brower House	Adolph Brower House	February 27, 1987 (#87000114)	1 Water St. 41°35′22″N 73°57′01″W	New Hamburg	Intact vernacular Greek Revival mid-19th century home of early lime quarry owner
11	Building at 73 Mansion St.	Building at 73 Mansion St.	June 4, 1997 (#97000531)	73 Mansion St. 41°42′25″N 73°55′39″W	Poughkeepsie	1890 Queen Anne built by local real estate attorney
12	Cedarcliff Gatehouse	Cedarcliff Gatehouse	November 26, 1982 (#82001125)	66 Ferris Lane; 41°41′03″N 73°55′13″W	Poughkeepsie	Historic gatehouse built about 1845
13	Church of the Holy Comforter	Church of the Holy Comforter	April 13, 1972 (#72000831)	13 Davies St. 41°42′22″N 73°56′13″W	Poughkeepsie	Richard Upjohn-designed church; landmark of city to traffic on US 9
14	Church Street Row	Church Street Row	November 26, 1982 (#82001126)	Church St. from Academy to Hamilton St. 41°42′02″N 73°55′34″W	Poughkeepsie	Largest group of 19th-century brick residences in city
15	Clark House	Clark House	November 26, 1982 (#82001127)	85 Cedar Ave. 41°40′26″N 73°54′19″W	Poughkeepsie	
16	CLEARWATER (Sloop)	CLEARWATER (Sloop)	May 4, 2004 (#04000376)	Main St. on the Hudson River; 41°42′26″N 73°56′28″W	Poughkeepsie	Dutch-style sloop started pioneering environmental organization in 1970s
17	Clinton House	Clinton House	November 26, 1982 (#82001128)	547 Main St. 41°42′01″N 73°54′58″W	Poughkeepsie	1765 stone house mistakenly believed to have been home at one time to George Clinton; now home to Dutchess County Historical Society
18	Collingwood Opera House and Office Building	Collingwood Opera House and Office Building	October 20, 1977 (#77000939)	31-37 Market St. 41°42′11″N 73°55′45″W	Poughkeepsie	Now Bardavon Theatre. Built in 1869 and still a popular venue for bands, movies, and comedians.
19	Corlies–Hart–Ritter House	Corlies–Hart–Ritter House	August 18, 2014 (#14000486)	103 S. Hamilton St. 41°41′42″N 73°55′42″W	Poughkeepsie	1872 Second Empire house that was home to three successive families important in local musical history
20	Dixon House		November 26, 1982 (#82001129)	49 N. Clinton St. 41°42′18″N 73°55′12″W	Poughkeepsie	
21	DuBois Farmhouse	DuBois Farmhouse	February 14, 2017 (#100000646)	6 Greenvale Farms Rd. 41°40′13″N 73°52′49″W	Poughkeepsie	1770 farmhouse redone in 1890 and 1956
22	Dutchess County Court House	Dutchess County Court House	November 26, 1982 (#82001130)	10 Market St. 41°42′14″N 73°55′47″W	Poughkeepsie	1903 courthouse is third building on site of original 1721 courthouse
23	Dwight-Hooker Avenue Historic District	Dwight-Hooker Avenue Historic District	November 26, 1982 (#82001132)	Dwight St. from Hamilton to Hooker, and 79-85 Hooker Ave. 41°41′39″N 73°55′26″W	Poughkeepsie	
24	Eastman Terrace	Eastman Terrace	November 26, 1982 (#82001133)	1-10 Eastman Terr. 41°41′48″N 73°55′54″W	Poughkeepsie	Historic rowhouse block built in 1872
25	Ethal House	Ethal House	November 26, 1982 (#82001134)	171 Hooker Ave. 41°41′18″N 73°54′59″W	Poughkeepsie	Built about 1910 and is a 1 1/2-story, three-bay-wide frame Bungalow–style dwelling.
26	Farmer's and Manufacturer's Bank	Farmer's and Manufacturer's Bank	November 26, 1982 (#82001135)	43 Market St. 41°42′10″N 73°55′46″W	Poughkeepsie	Only remaining non-residential Greek Revival building in city
27	First Baptist Church	First Baptist Church	July 25, 2001 (#01000774)	260 Mill St. 41°42′19″N 73°55′43″W	Poughkeepsie	
28	First Presbyterian Church	First Presbyterian Church	November 26, 1982 (#82001136)	25 S. Hamilton St. 41°42′04″N 73°55′29″W	Poughkeepsie	
29	First Presbyterian Church Rectory	First Presbyterian Church Rectory	November 26, 1982 (#82001137)	98 Cannon St. 41°42′04″N 73°55′31″W	Poughkeepsie	
30	Freer House	Freer House	November 26, 1982 (#82001138)	70 Wilbur Boulevard; 41°40′46″N 73°54′38″W	Poughkeepsie	Farmers cottage built about 1728 and is the oldest extant structure in the City of Poughkeepsie
31	Garfield Place Historic District	Garfield Place Historic District	November 29, 1972 (#72000832)	Both sides of Garfield Pl. 41°41′52″N 73°55′49″W	Poughkeepsie	Mid-19th century neighborhood homes for those who became wealthy from early industrialization. Renamed in memory of James A. Garfield after his assassination.
32	Glebe House	Glebe House	November 26, 1982 (#82001139)	635 Main St. 41°41′54″N 73°54′44″W	Poughkeepsie	1767 home for local minister
33	Gregory House	Gregory House	November 26, 1982 (#82001140)	140 S. Cherry St. 41°41′45″N 73°55′05″W	Poughkeepsie	Built in 1869, is an historic Second Empire style building.
34	Grey Hook	Grey Hook	November 26, 1982 (#82001141)	5 Ferris Lane; 41°41′18″N 73°55′03″W	Poughkeepsie	Built in 1911 and is a 1 1/2-story, two-bay-wide concrete block Bungalow-style dwelling.
35	Harlow Row	Harlow Row	November 26, 1982 (#82001142)	100-106 Market St. 41°42′00″N 73°55′53″W	Poughkeepsie	Built by former mayor William Harlow as affordable townhouses in 1874
36	Hasbrouck House	Hasbrouck House	November 26, 1982 (#82001143)	75-77 Market St. 41°42′05″N 73°55′48″W	Poughkeepsie	Unusually large Romanesque Revival house for a city Poughkeepsie's size; today headquarters of county United Way
37	Hershkind House	Hershkind House	November 26, 1982 (#82001144)	30 Hooker Ave. 41°41′51″N 73°55′26″W	Poughkeepsie	
38	Hoffman House		July 8, 2007 (#07000669)	N. Water St., Upper Landing Park; 41°42′34″N 73°56′19″W	Poughkeepsie	
39	Hudson River State Hospital, Main Building	Hudson River State Hospital, Main Building	June 29, 1989 (#89001166)	Off U.S. Route 9; 41°43′57″N 73°55′44″W	Town of Poughkeepsie	Frederick Clarke Withers-designed High Victorian Gothic building was part of a new way to treat mental illness
40	Italian Center	Italian Center	April 19, 1972 (#72000833)	225-227 Mill St. 41°42′23″N 73°55′47″W	Poughkeepsie	1860s townhouse for wealthy family on west edge of downtown
41	Kimlin Cider Mill	Kimlin Cider Mill	February 13, 2003 (#03000020)	Cedar Ave. 41°40′02″N 73°54′17″W	Poughkeepsie	Mid-19th Century barn converted to a cider mill that became a popular local attraction for much of the 20th Century
42	Lady Washington Hose Company	Lady Washington Hose Company	November 26, 1982 (#82001145)	20 Academy St. 41°42′08″N 73°55′35″W	Poughkeepsie	Unusual combination of Gothic Revival and Japanese-inspired architecture
43	Locust Grove	Locust Grove	October 15, 1966 (#66000515)	370 South St. 41°40′27″N 73°56′07″W	Town of Poughkeepsie	Alexander Jackson Davis-designed Italian villa-style estate of Samuel F.B. Morse; preserved as it was by later owners
44	Luckey, Platt & Company Department Store	Luckey, Platt & Company Department Store	November 26, 1982 (#82001146)	332-346 Main Mall; 41°42′10″N 73°55′35″W	Poughkeepsie	Early department store was at one point the only one in Hudson Valley between Yonkers and Albany; major draw to city's downtown.
45	Mader House	Mader House	November 26, 1982 (#82001147)	101 Corlies Ave. 41°42′14″N 73°54′27″W	Poughkeepsie	Built about 1925 and is a 1 1/2-story, bungalow-style dwelling sheathed in pink stucco
46	Main Building, Vassar College	Main Building, Vassar College	September 19, 1973 (#73001183)	Vassar College campus 41°41′12″N 73°53′45″W	Town of Poughkeepsie	1861 Second Empire building was beginning of pioneering American women's college
47	Main Mall Historic District	Main Mall Historic District	November 26, 1982 (#82001148)	315 Main Mall to 11 Garden St.; also 293-317 Main St. and 3-6 Garden St. 41°42′13″N 73°55′38″W	Poughkeepsie	Well-preserved stretch of 19th-century commercial buildings; was centerpiece of former Main Mall. A boundary increase on February 26, 2024 expanded the listing and converted it to a historic district.
48	Main Street Historic District	Main Street Historic District	February 27, 1987 (#87000122)	Main St. roughly bounded by Stone and Bridge Sts. 41°35′15″N 73°56′56″W	New Hamburg	Small core of hamlet with intact mid-19th century houses
49	Maple Grove	Maple Grove	March 29, 2001 (#01000293)	301 S. Rd., U.S. Route 9; 41°40′52″N 73°55′39″W	Poughkeepsie	Historic estate circa 1850
50	Market Street Row	Market Street Row	November 26, 1982 (#82001149)	88-94 Market St. 41°42′05″N 73°55′51″W	Poughkeepsie	Group of three houses across from Adriance Library and Hasbrouck House includes oldest frame house in city.
51	Peter and Karen McComb House		August 12, 2009 (#08000098)	27 Hornbeck Ridge; 41°40′02″N 73°53′15″W	Poughkeepsie	
52	Mill Street-North Clover Street Historic District	Mill Street-North Clover Street Historic District	February 7, 1972 (#72000834)	Mill, Mansion, Vassar, and N. Clover Sts., Davies and Lafayette Pl.; also 101-115 Main and 25, 27, 29, and 32 N. Bridge Sts. 41°42′24″N 73°56′01″W	Poughkeepsie	Mid-19th century neighborhood not demolished during urban renewal; second set of boundaries represents a boundary increase of May 21, 1987
53	Moore House	Moore House	November 26, 1982 (#82001150)	37 Adriance Ave. 41°41′27″N 73°55′28″W	Poughkeepsie	1½-story, bungalow-style dwelling with slate roof built about 1910
54	Charles Morschauser House	Charles Morschauser House	August 18, 2014 (#14000487)	115 Hooker Ave. 41°41′25″N 73°55′19″W	Poughkeepsie	1902 Queen Anne home of prominent local lawyer
55	Mulrien House	Mulrien House	November 26, 1982 (#82001153)	64 Montgomery St. 41°41′59″N 73°55′34″W	Poughkeepsie	
56	New York State Armory	New York State Armory	November 26, 1982 (#82001154)	61-65 Market St. 41°42′07″N 73°55′47″W	Poughkeepsie	Isaac G. Perry-designed Romanesque Revival building
57	Niagara Engine House	Niagara Engine House	November 26, 1982 (#82001155)	8 N. Hamilton St. 41°42′09″N 73°55′26″W	Poughkeepsie	1909 Late Gothic Revival firehouse by local architect Percival M. Lloyd. Only one of the city's six engine company firehouses remaining.
58	Pelton Mill	Pelton Mill	November 26, 1982 (#82001156)	110 Mill St. 41°42′30″N 73°56′11″W	Poughkeepsie	Historic carpet mill now re-purposed as apartments
59	Phillips House	Phillips House	November 26, 1982 (#82001157)	18 Barclay St. 41°41′51″N 73°55′37″W	Poughkeepsie	
60	Post-Williams House	Post-Williams House	November 26, 1982 (#82001158)	44 S. Clinton St. 41°41′53″N 73°55′23″W	Poughkeepsie	
61	Poughkeepsie Almshouse and City Infirmary	Poughkeepsie Almshouse and City Infirmary	December 4, 1978 (#78001849)	20 Maple St. 41°42′02″N 73°54′45″W	Poughkeepsie	
62	Poughkeepsie City Hall	Poughkeepsie City Hall	January 20, 1972 (#72000835)	228 Main St. 41°42′14″N 73°55′48″W	Poughkeepsie	Former city hall constructed in 1831 in the Greek Revival Style. Now used as the Commissioner of Jurors Office.
63	Poughkeepsie Meeting House (Hooker Avenue)	Poughkeepsie Meeting House (Hooker Avenue)	April 27, 1989 (#89000306)	249 Hooker Ave. 41°41′10″N 73°54′42″W	Poughkeepsie	Historic Quaker (Society of Friends) meeting house built in 1927.
64	Poughkeepsie Meeting House (Montgomery Street)	Poughkeepsie Meeting House (Montgomery Street)	April 27, 1989 (#89000304)	112 Montgomery St. 41°41′57″N 73°55′35″W	Poughkeepsie	
65	Poughkeepsie Railroad Bridge	Poughkeepsie Railroad Bridge	February 23, 1979 (#79001577)	Spans the Hudson River; 41°42′38″N 73°57′15″W	Poughkeepsie	1889 trestle bridge built by New Haven Railroad; abandoned in 1974, the bridge was opened in October, 2009 as Walkway Over The Hudson, a New York State Park. Extends into Highland in Ulster County
66	Poughkeepsie Railroad Station	Poughkeepsie Railroad Station	November 21, 1976 (#76001214)	Main St. 41°42′26″N 73°56′18″W	Poughkeepsie	1918 station is small-scale model of Grand Central Terminal building
67	Poughkeepsie Savings Bank	Poughkeepsie Savings Bank	December 4, 1998 (#98001445)	21 Market St. 41°42′13″N 73°55′47″W	Poughkeepsie	Well-preserved 1912 neoclassical building; used by TD Bank into 2010s
68	Poughkeepsie Trust Company	Poughkeepsie Trust Company	November 26, 1982 (#82001159)	236 Main St. 41°42′15″N 73°55′47″W	Poughkeepsie	Beaux Arts building completed in 1906 was Hudson Valley's first skyscraper and had the city's first elevator. Today used as Dutchess County District Attorney's offices.
69	Poughkeepsie Underwear Factory	Poughkeepsie Underwear Factory	November 26, 1982 (#82001160)	6-1 N. Cherry St. 41°42′06″N 73°55′06″W	Poughkeepsie	
70	Reformed Dutch Church of Poughkeepsie	Reformed Dutch Church of Poughkeepsie	February 28, 2008 (#08000099)	70 Hooker Ave. 41°41′48″N 73°55′19″W	Poughkeepsie	
71	Reynolds House	Reynolds House	November 26, 1982 (#82001161)	107 S. Hamilton St. 41°41′41″N 73°55′35″W	Poughkeepsie	
72	Rombout House	Rombout House	November 26, 1982 (#82001162)	New Hackensack Rd. 41°40′47″N 73°53′39″W	Poughkeepsie	
73	Rosenlund Estate Buildings		May 14, 1991 (#91000101)	Jct. of NY 9 and Beck Pl. 41°43′18″N 73°56′00″W	Poughkeepsie	On the campus of Marist University.
74	Sague House	Sague House	November 26, 1982 (#82001164)	167 Hooker Ave. 41°41′19″N 73°55′00″W	Poughkeepsie	Built about 1910 and is a 1½-story, three-bay-wide, bungalow-style dwelling.
75	St. Paul's Episcopal Church	St. Paul's Episcopal Church	November 26, 1982 (#82001163)	161 Mansion Street; 41°42′24″N 73°55′20″W	Poughkeepsie	1870 Norman-Gothic Revival-styled church
76	Second Baptist Church	Second Baptist Church	January 20, 1972 (#72000836)	36 Vassar St. 41°42′23″N 73°55′53″W	Poughkeepsie	Only Greek Revival church left in city
77	Shay's Warehouse and Stable	Shay's Warehouse and Stable	February 27, 1987 (#87000123)	Rear of 32 Point St. 41°35′14″N 73°56′58″W	New Hamburg	1865 industrial building with Picturesque touches; one of the few industrial buildings remaining in New Hamburg
78	William Shay Double House	William Shay Double House	February 27, 1987 (#87000121)	18 Point St. 41°35′13″N 73°57′00″W	New Hamburg	1870 duplex is unusually well-decorated and stylish for utilitarian housing in the area
79	Smith Metropolitan AME Zion Church	Smith Metropolitan AME Zion Church	November 21, 1991 (#91001724)	Junction of Smith and Cottage Sts. 41°42′23″N 73°54′58″W	Poughkeepsie	Late Gothic Revival church built in 1910
80	Soldiers' Memorial Fountain and Park	Soldiers' Memorial Fountain and Park	February 14, 2017 (#100000647)	120 Market St. 41°41′59″N 73°55′52″W	Poughkeepsie	
81	South Hamilton Street Row	South Hamilton Street Row	November 26, 1982 (#82001165)	81-87 S. Hamilton St. 41°41′48″N 73°55′34″W	Poughkeepsie	
82	Standard Gage Company Plant		February 2, 2024 (#100009881)	58 Parker Avenue; 41°42′41″N 73°55′30″W	Poughkeepsie	
83	Stone Street Historic District	Stone Street Historic District	February 27, 1987 (#87000120)	Stone St. from Division St. to Bridge St. 41°35′19″N 73°56′55″W	New Hamburg	Short block of intact 19th-century homes
84	Thompson House	Thompson House	November 26, 1982 (#82001166)	100 S. Randolph Ave. 41°40′53″N 73°55′14″W	Poughkeepsie	Second Empire style house built about 1880
85	Travis House	Travis House	November 26, 1982 (#82001167)	131 Cannon St. 41°42′03″N 73°55′20″W	Poughkeepsie	
86	Trinity Methodist Episcopal Church and Rectory		November 26, 1982 (#82001168)	1-3 Hooker Ave. 41°41′54″N 73°55′31″W	Poughkeepsie	Demolished after a fire in 2008
87	Union Free School	Union Free School	February 27, 1987 (#87000117)	Academy St. 41°35′21″N 73°56′44″W	New Hamburg	1875 school, used until 1940, was only public building in hamlet
88	Union Street Historic District	Union Street Historic District	December 9, 1971 (#71000537)	About 8 blocks in downtown Poughkeepsie centered around Union St. 41°42′14″N 73°56′04″W	Poughkeepsie	Oldest section of city
89	Upper-Mill Street Historic District		November 26, 1982 (#82001169)	Roughly Mill St. from Center Plaza to Catherine St. 41°42′17″N 73°55′34″W	Poughkeepsie	
90	US Post Office-Poughkeepsie	US Post Office-Poughkeepsie	May 15, 1989 (#88002413)	55 Mansion St. 41°42′26″N 73°55′41″W	Poughkeepsie	Dedicated in 1937 by President Franklin D. Roosevelt, a Hyde Park native who insisted on preserving the Dutch heritage of the area through the use of fieldstone and was heavily involved in the design process.
91	Vassar College Observatory	Vassar College Observatory	July 17, 1991 (#91002051)	Raymond Ave. 41°41′18″N 73°53′36″W	Poughkeepsie	Workplace and classroom of Maria Mitchell, pioneering American female astronomer
92	Vassar Home for Aged Men	Vassar Home for Aged Men	April 13, 1972 (#72000837)	1 Vassar St. 41°42′19″N 73°55′53″W	Poughkeepsie	Senior-citizens' home built in 1880 served that purpose for almost a century. Now used by Cunneen-Hackett Arts Center and offices of local non-profit organizations.
93	Vassar Institute	Vassar Institute	January 20, 1972 (#72001540)	12 Vassar St. 41°42′20″N 73°55′55″W	Poughkeepsie	1882 building is best example of Victorian Italianate Gothic in city. Now used by Cunneen-Hackett Arts Center
94	Matthew Vassar Estate	Matthew Vassar Estate	August 11, 1969 (#69000141)	East off Academy St. below Livingston; 41°41′15″N 73°55′41″W	Poughkeepsie	Known as "Springside". Landscape by Andrew Jackson Downing is his only known surviving work largely as he designed it.
95	Vassar-Warner Row	Vassar-Warner Row	November 26, 1982 (#82001170)	S. Hamilton from Montgomery to 40 Hamilton St. 41°41′58″N 73°55′30″W	Poughkeepsie	
96	Violet Avenue School	Violet Avenue School	August 18, 2014 (#14000488)	191 Violet Ave. 41°43′40″N 73°54′43″W	Poughkeepsie	1940 stone Colonial Revival elementary school built in close consultation with Franklin D. Roosevelt
97	Wallace Company Department Store		May 13, 2024 (#100010269)	331 Main Street; 41°42′11″N 73°55′33″W	Poughkeepsie	
98	Young Men's Christian Association	Young Men's Christian Association	November 26, 1982 (#82001171)	58 Market St. 41°42′08″N 73°55′49″W	Poughkeepsie	1908 building is only glazed terra cotta building in city (only the facade remains).
99	Zion Memorial Chapel	Zion Memorial Chapel	February 27, 1987 (#87000119)	37 Point St. 41°35′18″N 73°57′00″W	New Hamburg	1902 chapel is late-stage example of wooden Gothic Revival church

== See also ==
- National Register of Historic Places listings in Dutchess County, New York
- National Register of Historic Places listings in New York
- List of armories and arsenals in New York City and surrounding counties
