= Eastman Terrace =

Historic house in New York, United States

- U.S. National Register of Historic Places
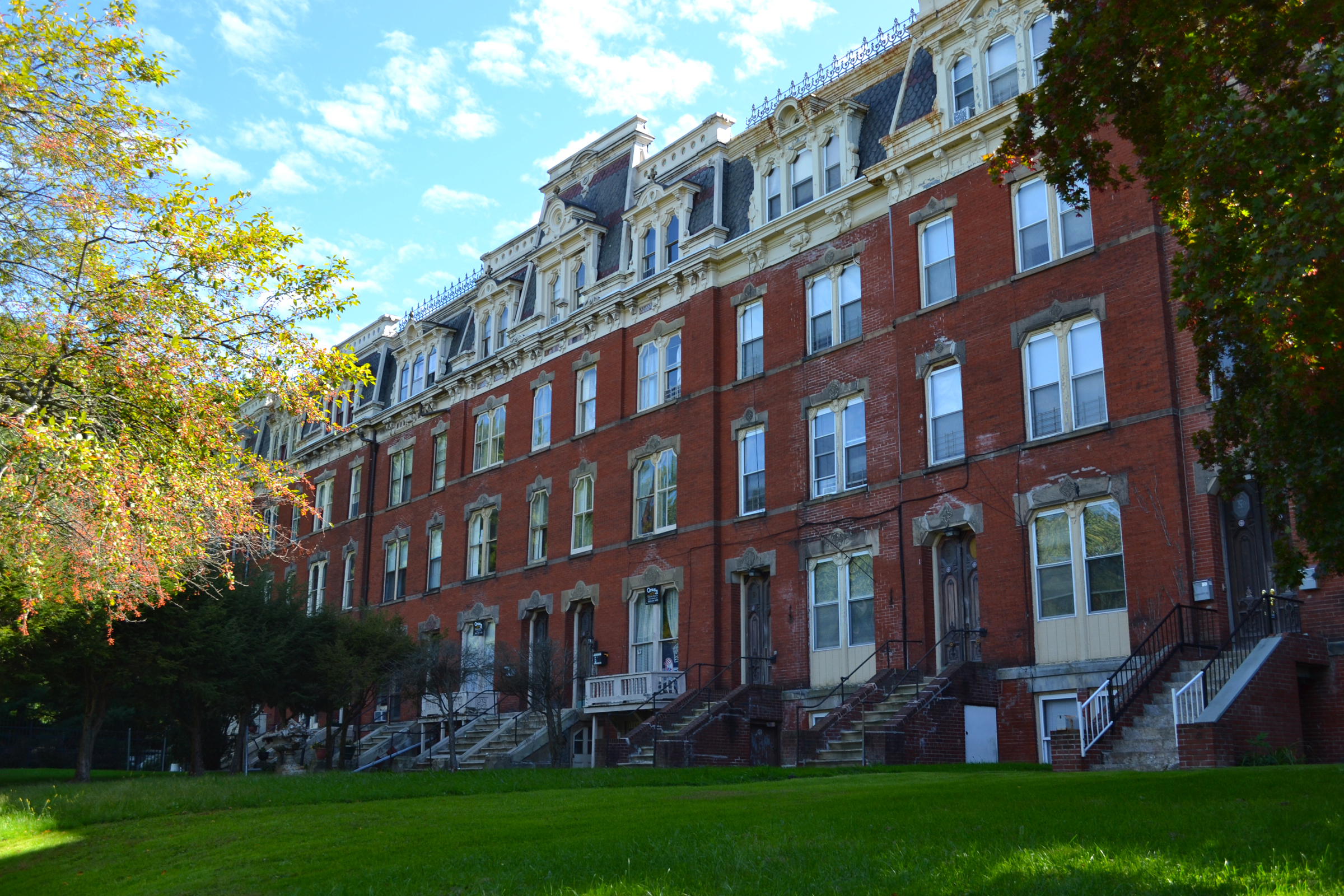
- The rowhouses in October 2015

- Location within New York Location within the United States
- Location: 1-10 Eastman Terr., Poughkeepsie, New York
- Coordinates: 41°41′48″N 73°55′54″W
- Area: less than one acre
- Built: 1872
- Architect: Thompson, A.G.
- Architectural style: Renaissance Revival
- MPS: Poughkeepsie MRA
- NRHP reference No.: 82001133
- Added to NRHP: November 26, 1982

Eastman Terrace is a historic rowhouse block located at Poughkeepsie, Dutchess County, New York. It was built in 1872 and consists of ten sections. The block is three stories high on a raised basement. It features a mansard roof with polychrome slate and an elaborate roofline with decorative stone parapets and iron cresting. The block was part of a larger plan to develop the Eastman Park section of the city.

It was added to the National Register of Historic Places in 1982.

== History ==
Harvey G. Eastman was an educator, politician, and prominent citizen of the City of Poughkeepsie in the mid-19th century. He established the Eastman Business College in 1859 and was the city's mayor from 1871 to 1874. Among other innovations Eastman brought to Poughkeepsie like street lighting and a central water system, he had a vision for the area bordering the southern edge of downtown. In 1865, he purchased 27 acres of swamp land right next to his mansion at Montgomery Street and South Avenue, and envisioned a park with a housing development to complete it. The park was to be of grand design and became known as the “Central Park” of Poughkeepsie. It was complete with fountains, a pond with a central island, a terraced walkway, a concert area, a ball field, a skating park, a small zoo, and an extensive flower garden. The park was bordered with walls of marble and paths of bluestone. The park, open to the public at no charge, was privately funded by Eastman at a total cost of $200,000 ($3,140,000 in 2016).

The second part of Eastman's vision was an urban townhouse community. In 1872, he planned to build 24 five-story rowhouses bordering the southern edge of the park in one long block along a street still known as Eastman Terrace. The development, which would ultimately fail, became known as “Eastman’s Folly.” The townhouses were offered at $17,000 each ($340,000 in 2016) and were marketed as the finest, most modern townhomes between New York City and Albany. Buyers had choices to their interior finishes like specially designed furniture and stenciled walls, all of the highest quality craftsmanship available. Eastman had 10 of the houses built but struggled to sell them. The answer seemed trivial to the local wealthy population; a narrow, connected house was unnecessary when one could build a large, detached house on nearby Academy Street or Garfield Place. While Eastman had the lots and walkways for the remaining 14 townhouses laid out, his struggle to sell the first 10 influenced his decision to stop construction of them before they were complete.

Eastman Park and the rowhouses still exist today, although with much less allure. The park no longer has its extravagant features, and in the 1970s the YMCA built a mostly athletic facility on the grounds and turned much of the park into athletic fields and a dirt running track, though the facility was closed in early 2009 from financial issues. The building and fields are mostly dilapidated now. The western side of the park is a combination football/baseball field which still hosts select football games between local high schools. Much of the park's marble walls and bluestone perimeter walks are still intact. The rowhouses were mostly converted to apartments in the early 20th century, with only one remaining a single-family home.

== See also ==
- National Register of Historic Places listings in Poughkeepsie, New York
