= List of mayors of Poughkeepsie, New York =

The following is a list of mayors of the city of Poughkeepsie, New York, United States.

- James Emott, 1854-1855
- Henry D. Varick, 1855
- George Wilkinson, 1856-1857
- Charles W. Swift, 1858-1860
- James Bowne, 1861-1862
- George Innis, 1863-1868
- George Morgan, 1869-1870
- Harvey G. Eastman, 1871-1874, 1877-1878
- Jacob P. Carpenter, 1875-1876
- John R. Cooper, 1878
- William Harloe, 1879-1880
- Ezra White, 1881-1886
- Edward Elsworth, 1887-1888, 1891-1892
- Charles M. Rowley, 1889-1890
- William M. Ketcham, 1893-1894
- Charles N. Arnold, 1895-1896
- J. Frank Hull, 1897-1898
- Isaac W. Sherrill, 1899-1900
- George M. Hine, 1901
- John K. Sague, c.1906-1911, 1928-1929
- William H. Frank Sr., c.1913
- Daniel W. Wilbur, c.1915-1916
- Ralph F. Butts, c.1920-1921
- George D. Campbell, c.1922
- Frank B. Lovelace, 1924-1928
- Alexander Caven, c.1930-1933
- George V. L. Spratt, c.1934-1939
- William H. Schrauth, c.1940-1943
- Frank M. Doran, c.1944-1947
- Horace S. Graham, c.1948-1949
- Robert E. Stevens, c.1952-1955
- J. Thomas Dietz, c.1956
- J. George Spitz, c.1959
- Victor C. Waryas 1960-1964
- Christopher Atkinson 1965
- Robert Ahmed, 1976-1977
- John T. Kennedy, 1978-1979
- Thomas C. Aposporos, 1980-1987
- Robert Bleakley 1988-1991
- Colette Lafuente, c.1996-2001
- Nancy Cozean, 2004-2008
- John Tkazyik, c.2008-2014
- Robert Rolison, 2016-2022
- Marc Nelson, 2023
- Yvonne Flowers, 2024-present

== See also ==
- Poughkeepsie City Hall
- History of Poughkeepsie, New York
