= Mulrien House =

Historic house in New York, United States

- U.S. National Register of Historic Places
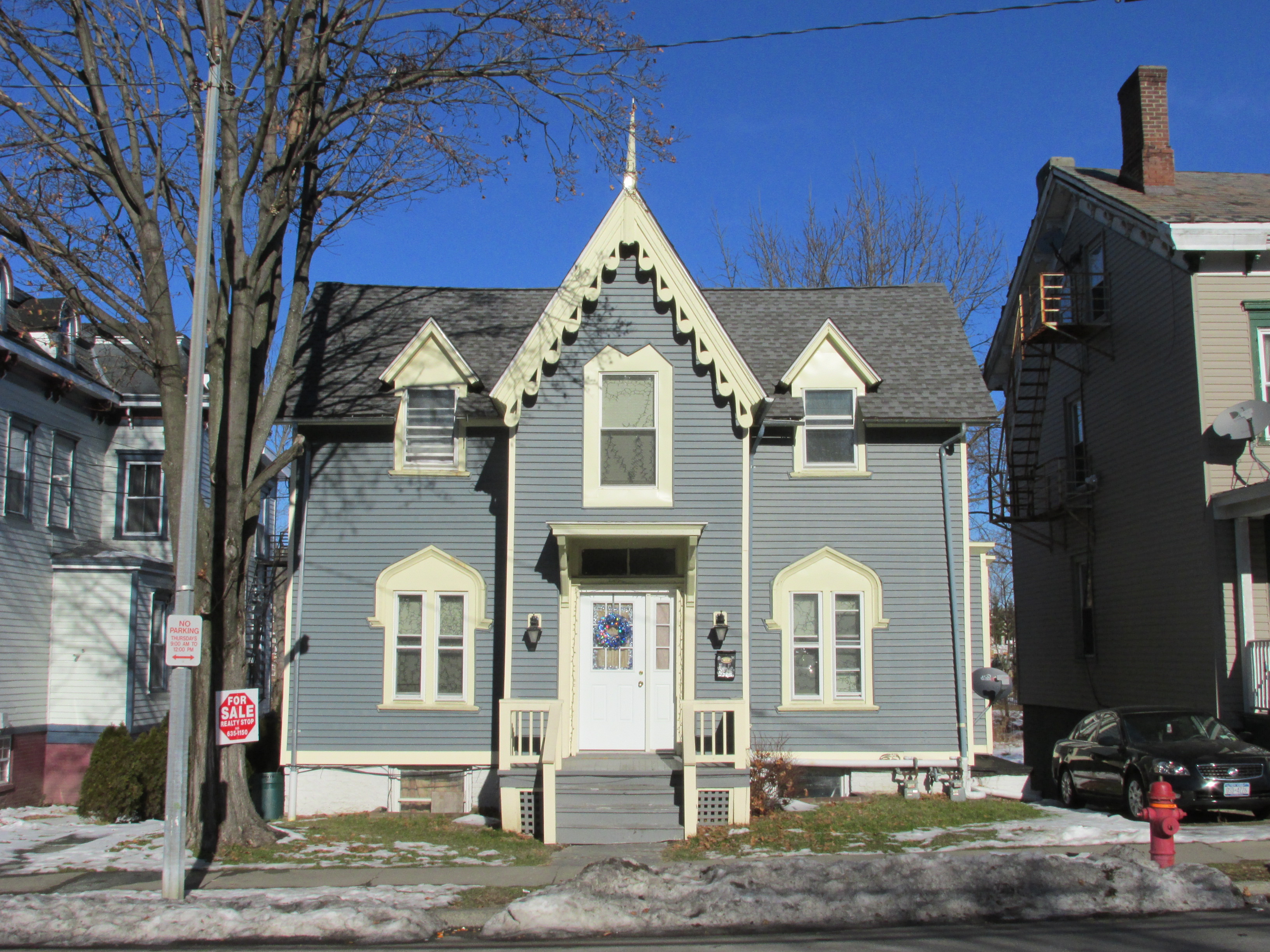
- 64 Montgomery Street, January 2013

- Location within New York Location within the United States
- Location: 64 Montgomery St., Poughkeepsie, New York
- Coordinates: 41°41′59″N 73°55′34″W
- Area: less than one acre
- Built: 1862
- Architectural style: Gothic Revival
- MPS: Poughkeepsie MRA
- NRHP reference No.: 82001153
- Added to NRHP: November 26, 1982

The Mulrien House is located on Montgomery Street in Poughkeepsie, New York, United States. It was built in 1862 and is a 1 1/2-story, Gothic Revival–style dwelling with a steeply pitched, slate-covered cross-gable roof. It features curved and cut-out bargeboard with ornamentation and a small balcony over the front door.

It was added to the National Register of Historic Places in 1982.

== See also ==
- National Register of Historic Places listings in Poughkeepsie, New York
