= Farmer's and Manufacturer's Bank =

Historic commercial building in New York, United States

- U.S. National Register of Historic Places
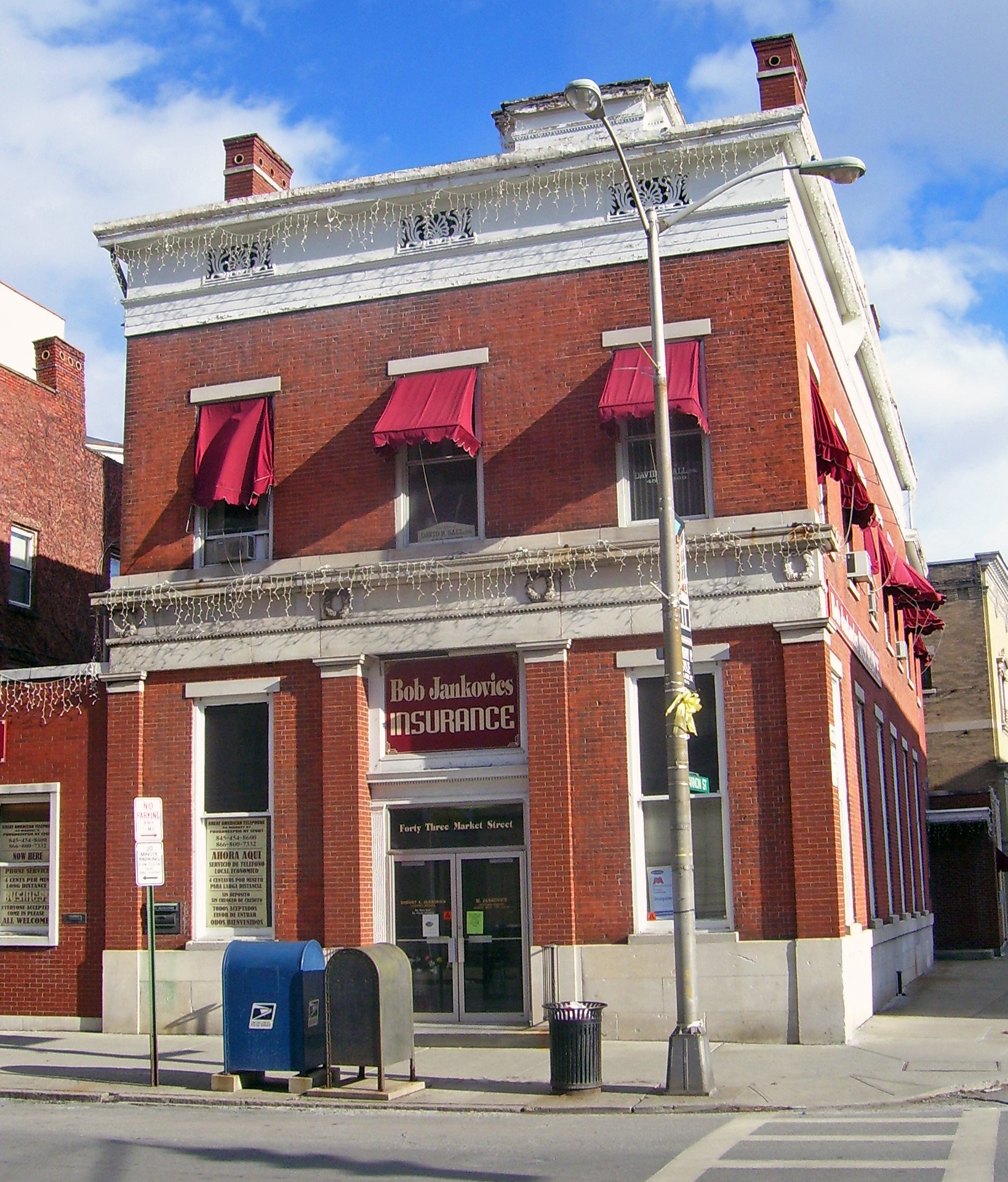
- Building in 2008

- Location within New York Location within the United States
- Interactive map showing the location for Farmer's and Manufacturer’s Bank
- Location: Poughkeepsie, NY
- Coordinates: 41°42′12″N 73°55′49″W
- Built: 1834
- Architectural style: Greek Revival
- NRHP reference No.: 82001135
- Added to NRHP: 1982

The Farmer's and Manufacturer's Bank building is located at the corner of Market and Cannon Streets in downtown Poughkeepsie, New York, United States, near the Bardavon and across from the Dutchess County Court House and Old Poughkeepsie YMCA. It is one of only two non-residential Greek Revival buildings remaining in the city.

The three-bay, 2 1/2-story brick building was opened to the public in 1835, the year after it was built. Signatures of the then-popular Greek Revival style include the wide frieze and pilasters on the first story, eyebrow windows, balustrade and cupola. The brick is complemented by stone trim, particularly around the windows. First-floor ornamentation includes a stone entablature with dentil molding and four laurel wreaths.

It would be a landmark of the city's downtown for much of the 19th century. The bank itself would later become Empire National Bank and relocate elsewhere. One of its original trustees and later president was Matthew Vassar, founder of the eponymous college.

Originally it had a front porch, which was removed in 1892. That has been the only significant alteration to the building's exterior. On the inside, the windows were elongated and lengthened. In 1953 the interior was thoroughly modernized.

In 1982 it was added to the National Register of Historic Places, one of three bank buildings on or near Market Street to be added. It is currently home to Friendly Insurance insurance agency DBA Bob Jankovics Insurance. Its history is curated by Elizabeth Burns of Rhinebeck. The old city hall, around the corner on Main Street, is the only other non-residential Greek Revival building in the city.

== See also ==
- National Register of Historic Places listings in Poughkeepsie, New York
