= Second Baptist Church (Poughkeepsie, New York) =

Historic church in New York, United States

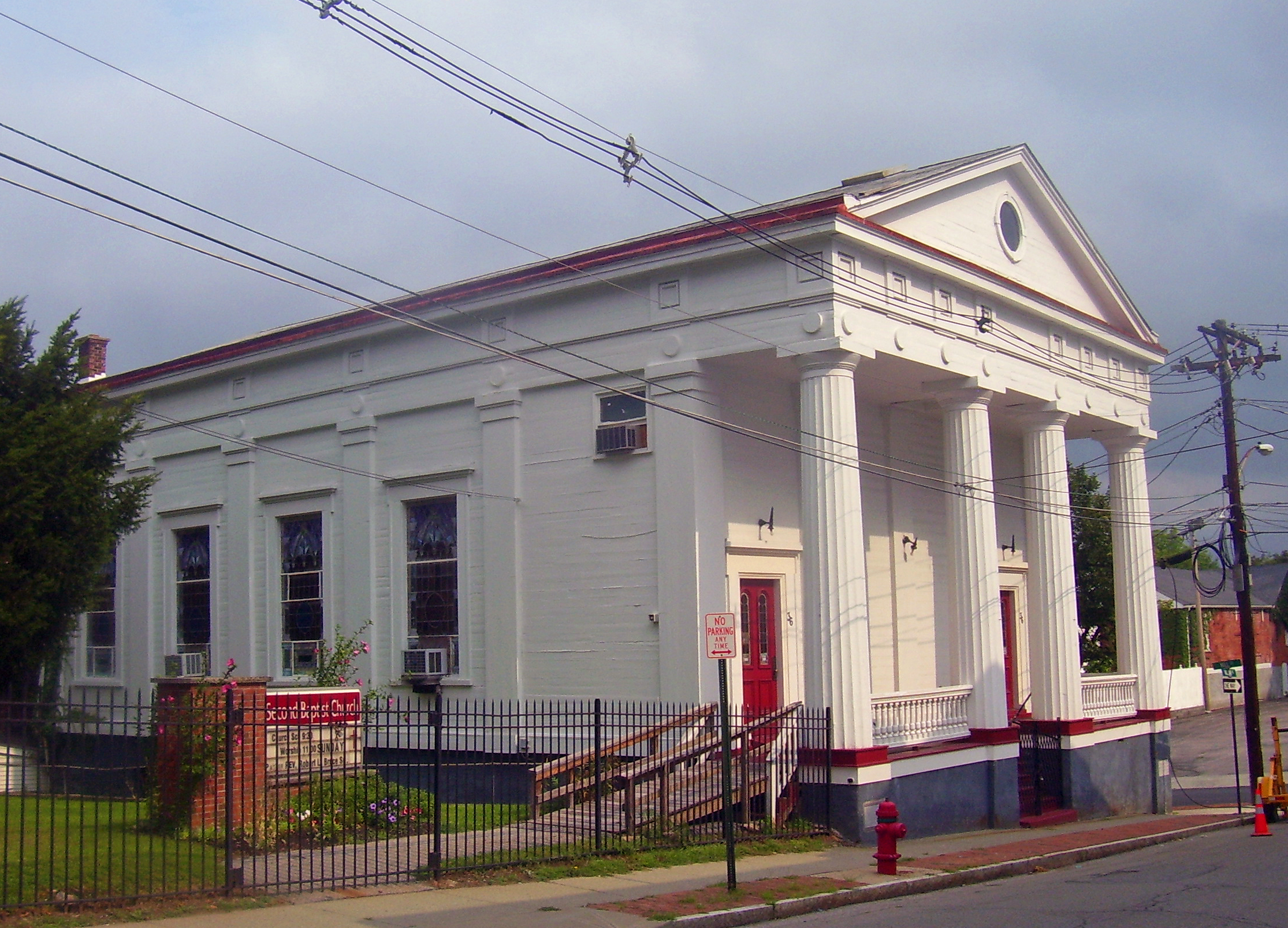
- East (front) elevation and south profile, 2008

Religion
- Affiliation: American Baptist Churches USA

Location
- Location: Poughkeepsie, NY, USA
- Interactive map of Second Baptist Church
- Coordinates: 41°42′23″N 73°55′51″W

Architecture
- Type: Church
- Style: Greek Revival

Specifications
- Direction of façade: east
- Materials: Wood

U.S. National Register of Historic Places
- Added to NRHP: January 20, 1972
- NRHP Reference no.: 72000836

The Second Baptist Church in Poughkeepsie, New York, United States, is located at the corner of Vassar and Mill streets. It is a wooden building from the late 1830s in the Greek Revival architectural style, the only remaining church in the city in that style.

A number of congregations have used the building since it was first erected. It was even a synagogue at one point, possibly leading to the nickname Vassar Temple, since it was built on land originally owned by Matthew Vassar, founder of Vassar College. In 1972 it was listed on the National Register of Historic Places, and later became a contributing property to the Mill Street-North Clover Street Historic District.

== Building ==
The church is rectangular, three bays by six, with the narrow, colonnaded facade facing east. It has only one story, plus an attic, but appears to have two due to its brick basement being exposed on all but the south sides. The gabled roof has a gentle pitch

Four pilasters on the short sides, and six on the long, separate each bay. All are sided in flush board. The main entrance is a pedimented portico supported by four wooden Doric columns topped with flat-disced architraves topped by a frieze of alternating flat panels and triglyphs. The entablature is framed by a boxed cornice, and a small round window with segmented frame is at its center.

The two main entrance doors have stained glass windows, and there are four larger ones on the longer elevations. All have the same design, of two columns on ornate bases supporting an arched ribbed baldachin-like canopy and ornament.

== History ==
The property was first used for religious purposes in the mid-1830s, when a splinter group from the Presbyterian Church bought it from Matthew Vassar's family. The church design is based on a pattern in an 1833 builder's guide. Greek Revival architecture was popular and influential for public buildings, as well as having elements used for residential buildings. The Presbyterian congregation did not last, and they sold the building to the First Congregational Church in 1842. The church's ownership and uses reflected changing demographics of the city.

Years later the congregation sold it to a private owner, who donated it to the local Masonic lodge in 1859. The next year the lodge sold it to Matthew Vassar, Jr. He sold it to a local synagogue, the Congregated Brethren of Israel, in 1868. This use led to it being referred to as the "Vassar Temple", which also referred to its front colonnade.

The Second Baptist Church and the Farmer's and Manufacturer's Bank on Market Street are the only major non-residential Greek Revival buildings left in Poughkeepsie. The rest, such as the former city hall, have been demolished and superseded.
