= Nancy Cozean =

American journalist and mayor

Nancy J. Cozean (born November 22, 1947) is an American politician who served as mayor of the city of Poughkeepsie, New York from 2004 to 2008. During her tenure, the city has experienced significant economic growth and its first sustained population growth in nearly 50 years (State of City reports 2003–2006). A member of the Democratic Party, she made her first venture into politics in 1996, challenging the Republican incumbent NY State Assemblyman Tom Kirwan, and was narrowly defeated.

Before being elected mayor, she was a television news reporter and anchor in places such as Washington, D.C., St. Louis, Missouri and Evansville, Indiana, and at WNYT in Albany, New York and WTZA-TV (now WRNN), in Kingston. She has received numerous awards for her journalistic contributions (Associated Press, 1981).

Cozean earned a Bachelor of Fine Arts from Stephens College, and a Bachelor of Arts and a Master of Arts in journalism from the University of Missouri School of Journalism. She has also worked as an adjunct professor at Marist College, SUNY New Paltz and Dutchess County Community College.

== Personal life ==
Cozean was married to Donald Jacob, who was a state legislator in North Dakota, from 1976 until his death in 2015, where he also served as state chairman of the Young Republicans. He also worked as Senior Associate to the House Appropriations Committee, U.S. Congress.

A native of Farmington, Missouri, Cozean is an officer in her family-owned business, Farmington Undertaking Company, which has been in her family for four generations. She is also president of Cozean Communications, a public relations consulting firm.

== See also ==
- List of mayors of Poughkeepsie, New York
