= Upper–Mill Street Historic District =

Historic district in New York, United States

- U.S. National Register of Historic Places
- U.S. Historic district
- Location within New York Location within the United States
- Location: Roughly Mill St. from Center Plaza to Catherine St., Poughkeepsie, New York
- Coordinates: 41°42′17″N 73°55′34″W
- Area: 6 acres (2.4 ha)
- Architect: Dudley, James H.
- Architectural style: Late Victorian, mixed (more than two styles from different periods)
- MPS: Poughkeepsie MRA
- NRHP reference No.: 82001169
- Added to NRHP: November 26, 1982

Upper–Mill Street Historic District is a national historic district located at Poughkeepsie, Dutchess County, New York. It includes 25 contributing buildings built during the mid- to late-19th century. They include a variety of brick and frame buildings, originally residential, that have been converted to office and other commercial use. They are representative of vernacular mill workers' dwellings and fashionable factory owners' residences. The district also includes two churches.

It was added to the National Register of Historic Places in 1982.
