= South Hamilton Street Row =

Historic houses in New York, United States

- U.S. National Register of Historic Places
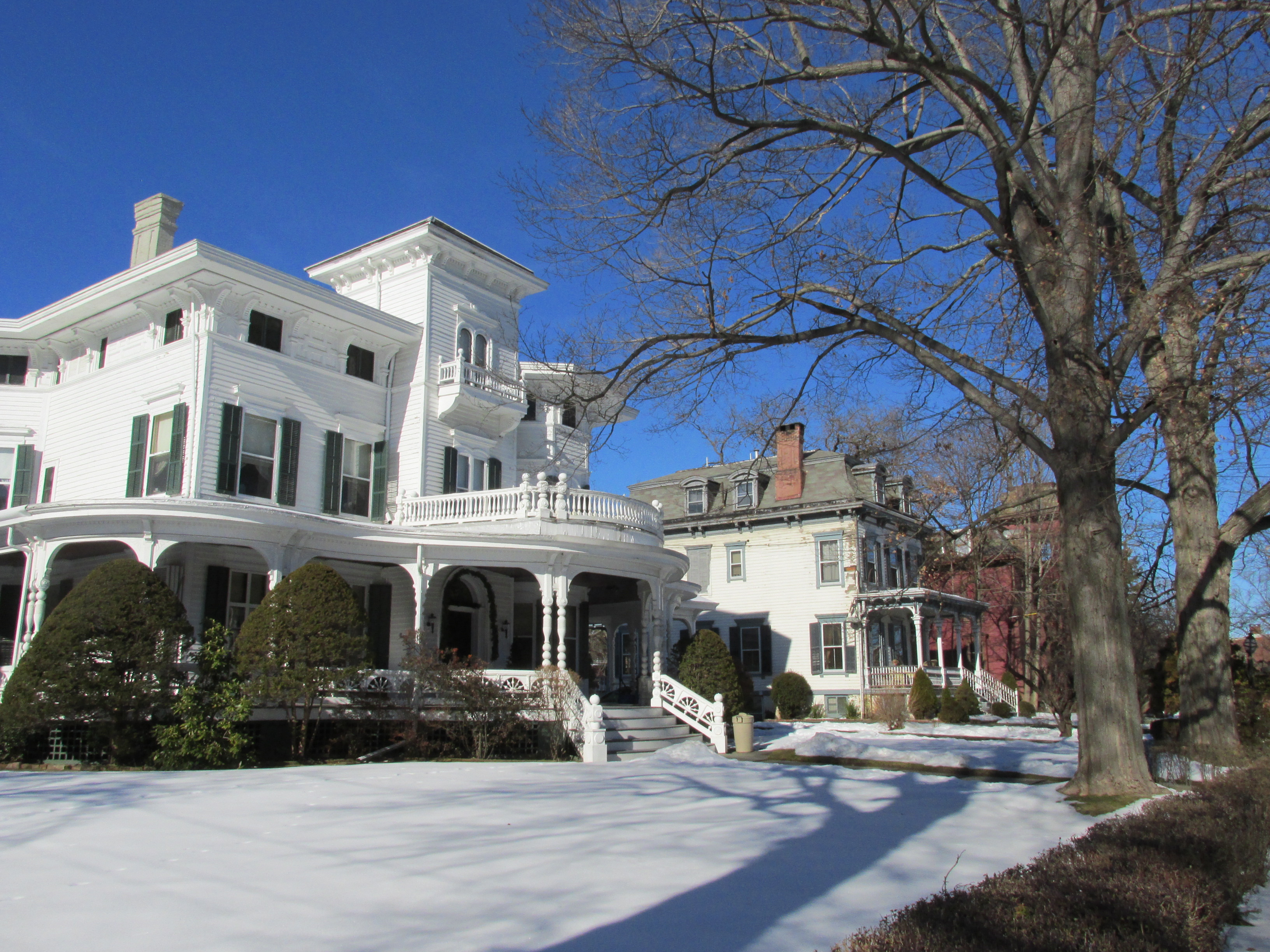
- Houses on South Hamilton Street, January 2013

- Location within New York Location within the United States
- Location: 81-87 S. Hamilton St., Poughkeepsie, New York
- Coordinates: 41°41′48″N 73°55′34″W
- Area: 3 acres (1.2 ha)
- Architectural style: Second Empire, Italianate
- MPS: Poughkeepsie MRA
- NRHP reference No.: 82001165
- Added to NRHP: November 26, 1982

South Hamilton Street Row is a set of historic homes located at Poughkeepsie, Dutchess County, New York. There are four contributing houses, built in 1871 or 1872, and a large period barn. They represent popular architectural styles including a 2-story Second Empire style residence and 3 1/2-story Italian Villa. The group is representative of upper middle class suburbs of the 1870s.

It was added to the National Register of Historic Places in 1982.
