= Sague House =

Historic house in New York, United States

- U.S. National Register of Historic Places
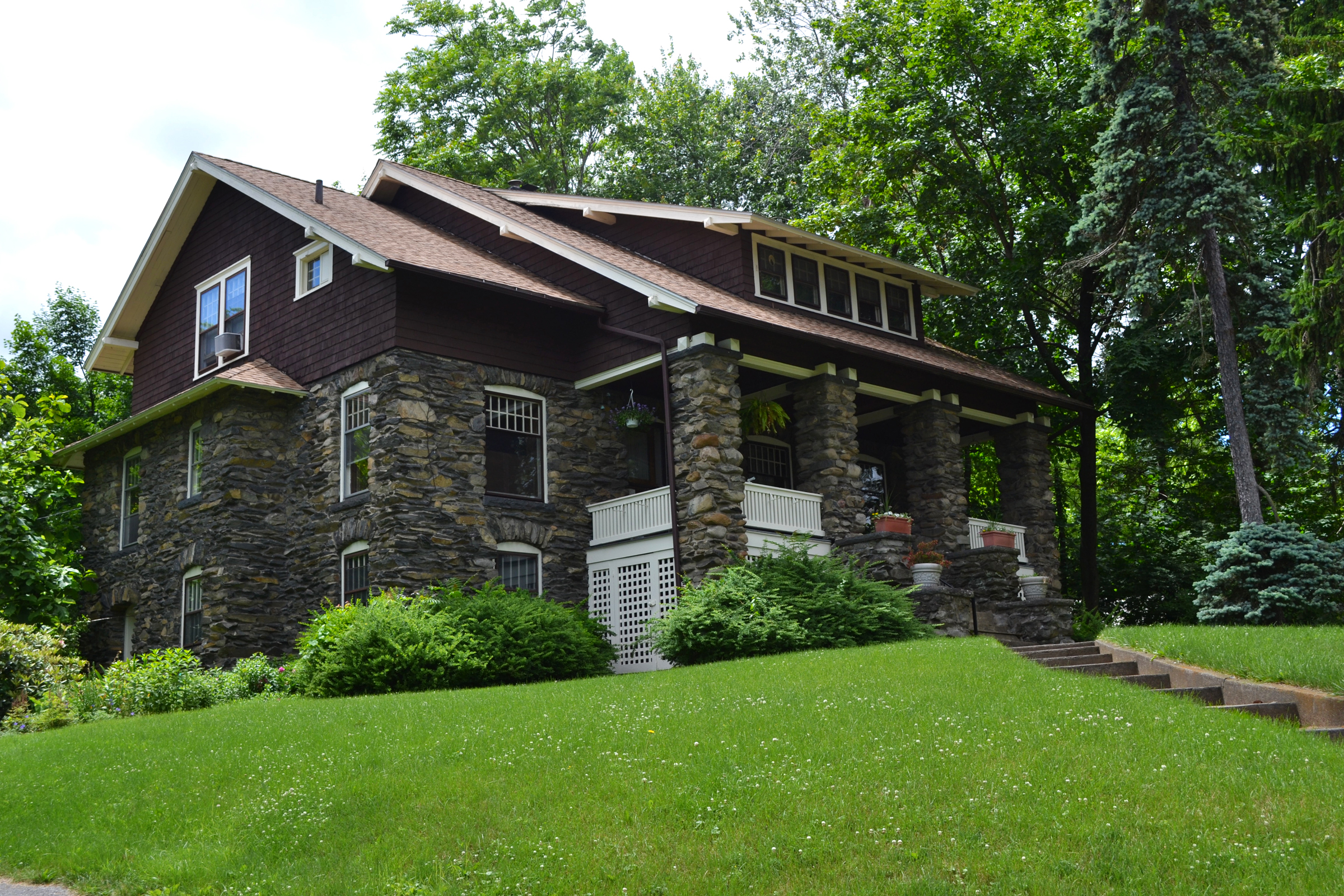
- The house in June 2013.

- Location within New York Location within the United States
- Location: 167 Hooker Ave., Poughkeepsie, New York
- Coordinates: 41°41′19″N 73°55′0″W
- Area: less than one acre
- Built: c. 1910
- Architect: Reid, Andre'
- Architectural style: Bungalow/Craftsman
- MPS: Poughkeepsie MRA
- NRHP reference No.: 82001164
- Added to NRHP: November 26, 1982

Sague House is a historic home located at Poughkeepsie, Dutchess County, New York. It was built about 1910 and is a 1 1/2-story, three-bay-wide, bungalow-style dwelling. It sits on a raised basement and four tall stone piers support the roof.

It was added to the National Register of Historic Places in 1982.
