= Ethal House =

Historic house in New York, United States

- Ethal House (Note: Initially listed on the National Register as "Ethol House"; spelling corrected in 2017.)
- U.S. National Register of Historic Places
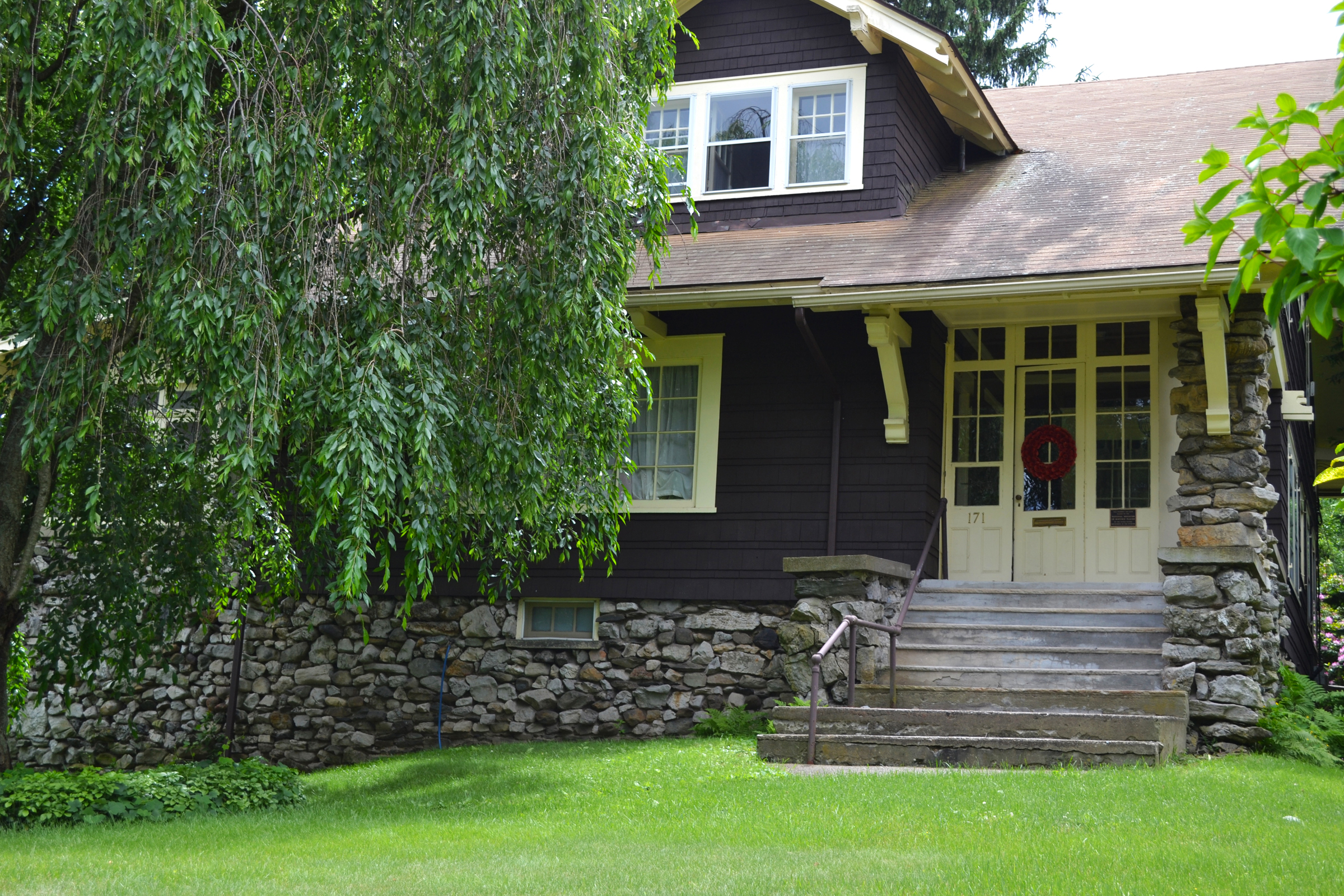
- The house in June 2013.

- Location within New York Location within the United States
- Location: 171 Hooker Ave., Poughkeepsie, New York
- Coordinates: 41°41′18″N 73°54′59″W
- Area: less than one acre
- Built: 1910
- Architect: Reid, André
- Architectural style: Bungalow/Craftsman
- MPS: Poughkeepsie MRA
- NRHP reference No.: 82001134
- Added to NRHP: November 26, 1982

The Ethal House is a historic home at Poughkeepsie, Dutchess County, New York. It was built about 1910 and is a 1 1/2-story, three-bay-wide frame Bungalow–style dwelling on a raised cobblestone foundation. It has a gable roof with wide dormer and a large stone chimney.

It was added to the National Register of Historic Places in 1982.
