= Reynolds House (Poughkeepsie, New York) =

Historic house in New York, United States

- U.S. National Register of Historic Places
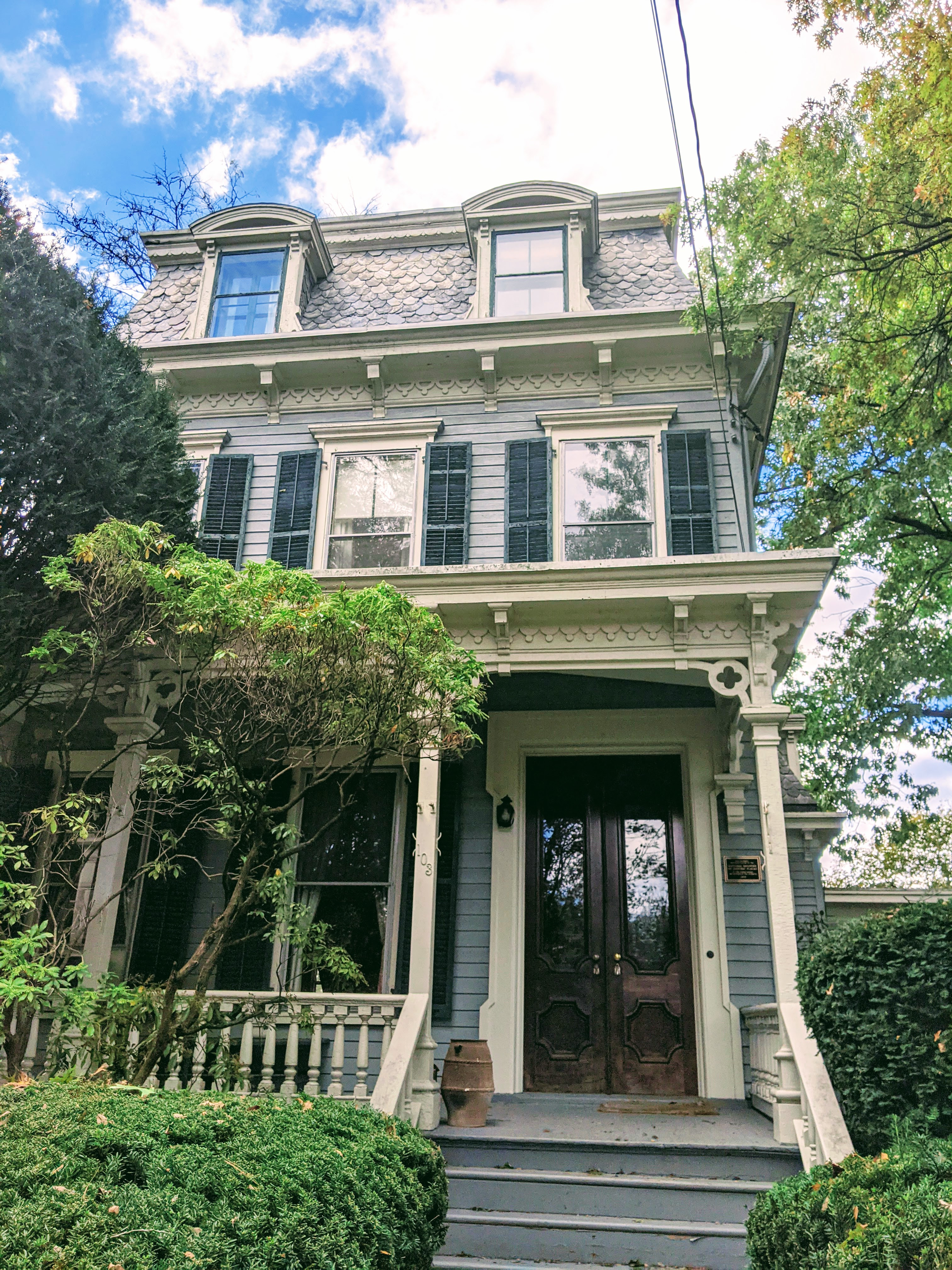

- Location within New York Location within the United States
- Location: 107 S. Hamilton St. Poughkeepsie, New York
- Coordinates: 41°41′41″N 73°55′35″W
- Area: less than one acre
- Built: c. 1895
- Architect: Carpenter, DuBois
- Architectural style: Shingle Style
- MPS: Poughkeepsie MRA
- NRHP reference No.: 82001161
- Added to NRHP: November 26, 1982

Reynolds House is a historic home located at Poughkeepsie, Dutchess County, New York. It was built about 1895 and is a 2 1/2-story Shingle Style dwelling. The raised basement and first stories are of cobblestone and the second and third stories are shingled. It features a front porch with Tuscan order columns.

It was added to the National Register of Historic Places in 1982.
