= Grey Hook =

Historic house in New York, United States

- U.S. National Register of Historic Places
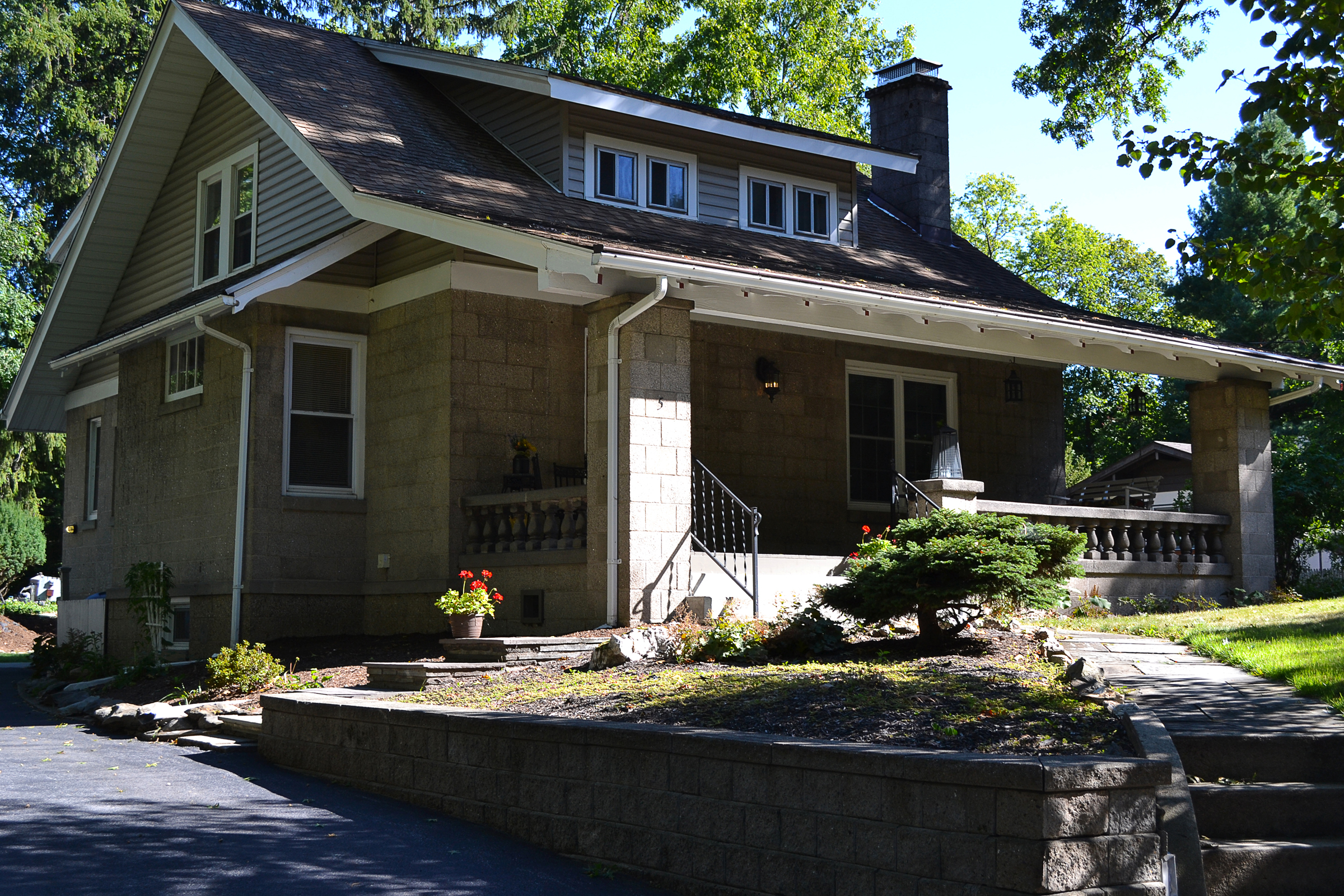
- The house in September 2015

- Location within New York Location within the United States
- Location: 5 Ferris Lane, Poughkeepsie, New York
- Coordinates: 41°41′18″N 73°55′3″W
- Area: less than one acre
- Built: 1911
- Architect: Bushnell, Raymond H.
- Architectural style: Cottage
- MPS: Poughkeepsie MRA
- NRHP reference No.: 82001141
- Added to NRHP: November 26, 1982

Grey Hook is a historic home located at Poughkeepsie, Dutchess County, New York. It was built in 1911 and is a 1 1/2-story, two-bay-wide concrete block Bungalow-style dwelling. It features a roof that sweeps out over the porch with concrete block columns and balustrade.

It was added to the National Register of Historic Places in 1982.
