= Post-Williams House =

Historic house in New York, United States built in 1877

- U.S. National Register of Historic Places
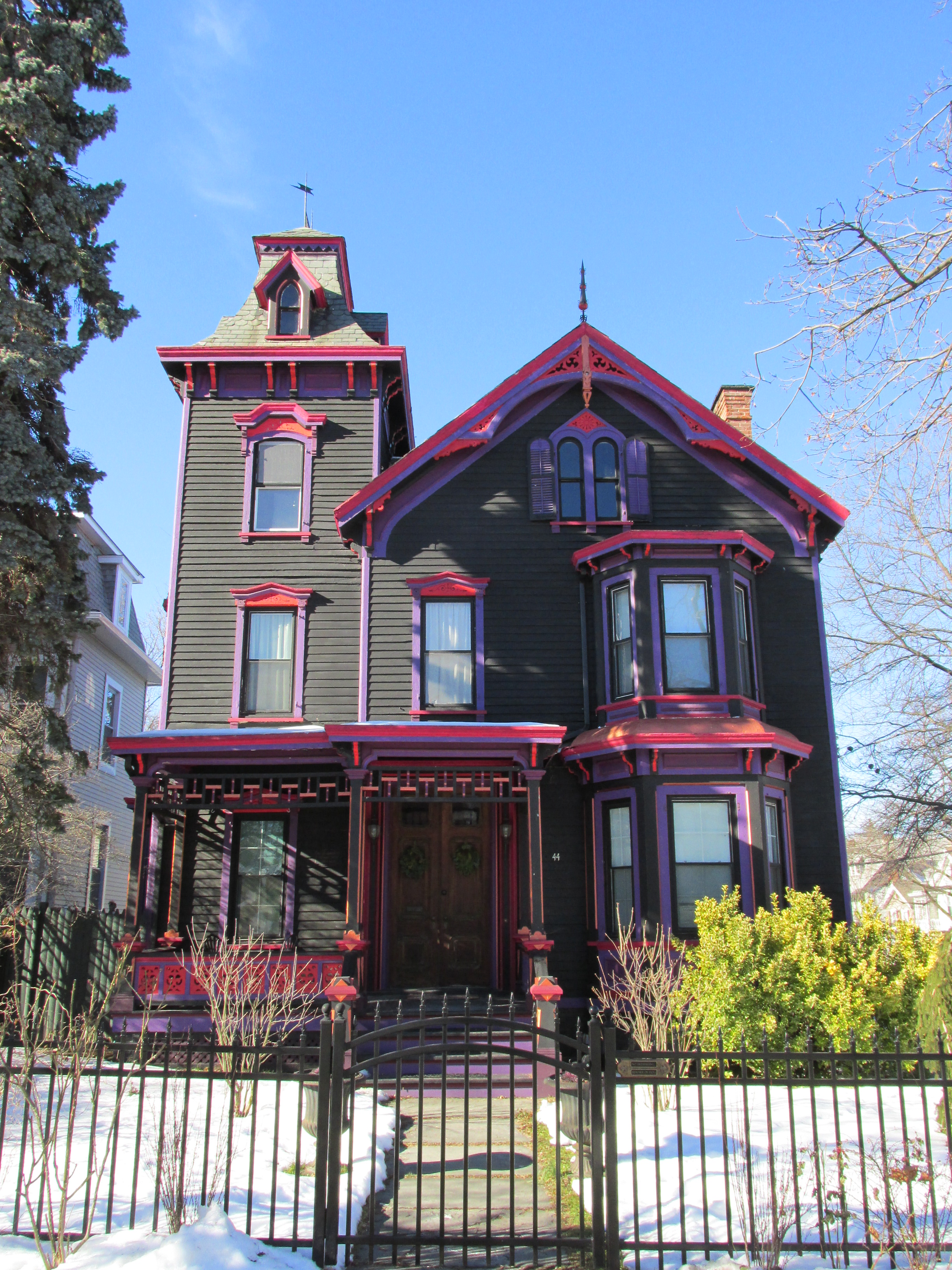
- Post-Williams House, January 2013

- Location within New York Location within the United States
- Location: 44 S. Clinton St., Poughkeepsie, New York
- Coordinates: 41°41′53″N 73°55′23″W
- Area: less than one acre
- Built: c. 1877
- Architect: Post, James S.
- Architectural style: Late Victorian
- MPS: Poughkeepsie MRA
- NRHP reference No.: 82001158
- Added to NRHP: November 26, 1982

Post-Williams House is a historic home located at Poughkeepsie, Dutchess County, New York. It was built about 1877 and is a 2 1/2-story, three-bay-wide, Late Victorian-style dwelling. It features a pitched roof and a 3 1/2-story tower with zig-zag moulding.

It was added to the National Register of Historic Places in 1982.
