= Travis House =

Historic house in New York, United States

- U.S. National Register of Historic Places
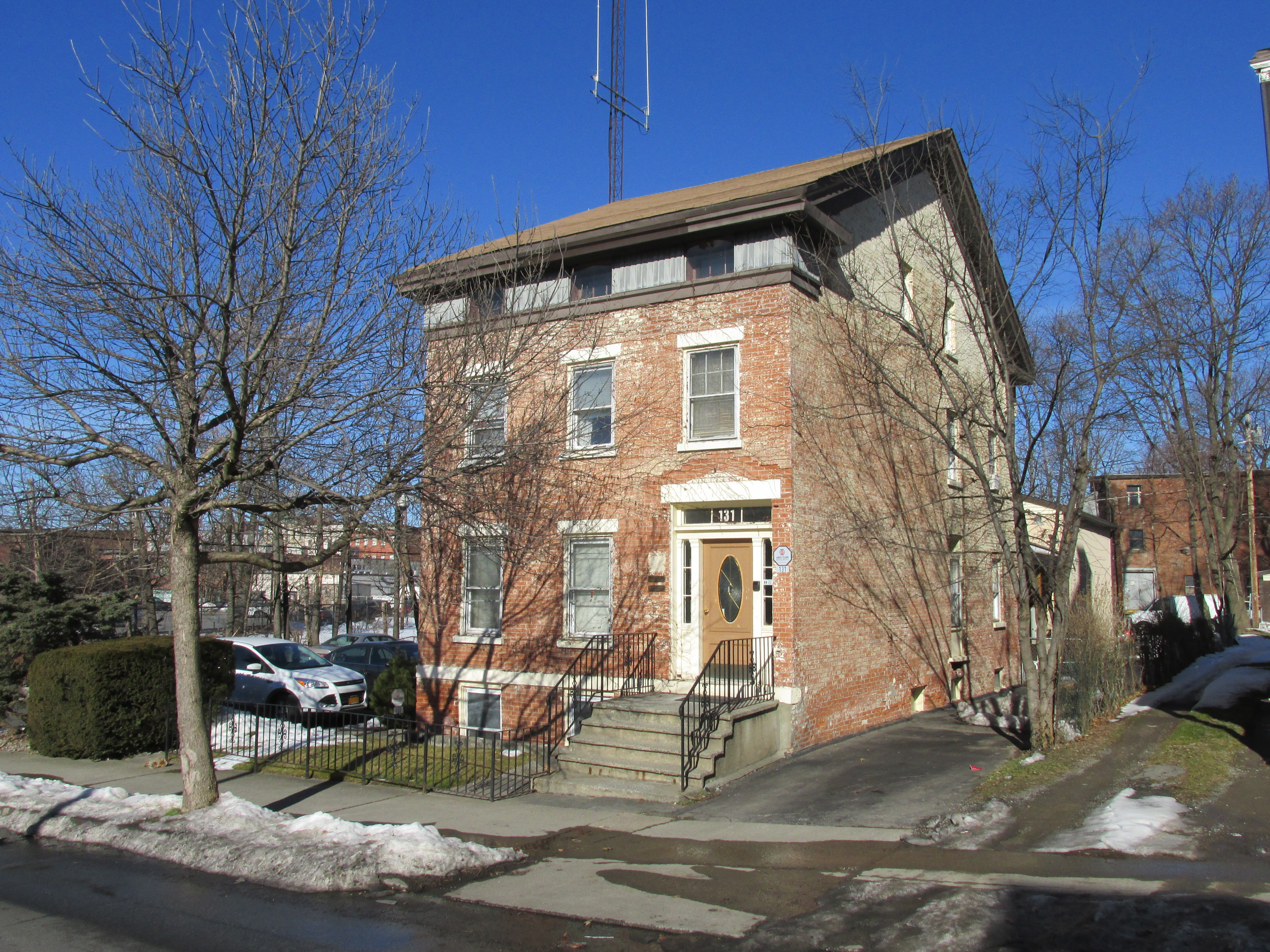
- 131 Cannon Street, January 2013

- Location within New York Location within the United States
- Location: 131 Cannon St., Poughkeepsie, New York
- Coordinates: 41°42′3″N 73°55′20″W
- Area: less than one acre
- Built: 1848
- Architect: Travis, John R.
- Architectural style: Greek Revival
- MPS: Poughkeepsie MRA
- NRHP reference No.: 82001167
- Added to NRHP: November 26, 1982

Travis House is a historic home located at Poughkeepsie, Dutchess County, New York. It was built about 1848 and is a 1 1/2-story, three-bay-wide, Greek Revival–style dwelling. It sits on a raised basement and has three eyebrow windows under the molded cornice.

It was added to the National Register of Historic Places in 1982.
