= Trinity Methodist Episcopal Church and Rectory (Poughkeepsie, New York) =

Historic church in New York, United States

- U.S. National Register of Historic Places
- Location within New York Location within the United States
- Location: 1-3 Hooker Ave., Poughkeepsie, New York
- Coordinates: 41°41′54″N 73°55′31″W
- Area: less than one acre
- Built: 1892
- Architect: Wheeler, Corydon
- Architectural style: Queen Anne, Romanesque
- MPS: Poughkeepsie MRA
- NRHP reference No.: 82001168
- Added to NRHP: November 26, 1982

Trinity Methodist Episcopal Church and Rectory is a historic Methodist Episcopal church and rectory located at Poughkeepsie, Dutchess County, New York. The church was built in 1892, and is a Romanesque Revival style brick and stone church. It features a massive hexagonal tower with castellated elements and an open belfry. The rectory was also built in 1892, and is a 2 1/2-story Queen Anne style dwelling.

It was listed on the National Register of Historic Places in 1982.
