= Phillips House (Poughkeepsie, New York) =

Historic house in New York, United States

- U.S. National Register of Historic Places
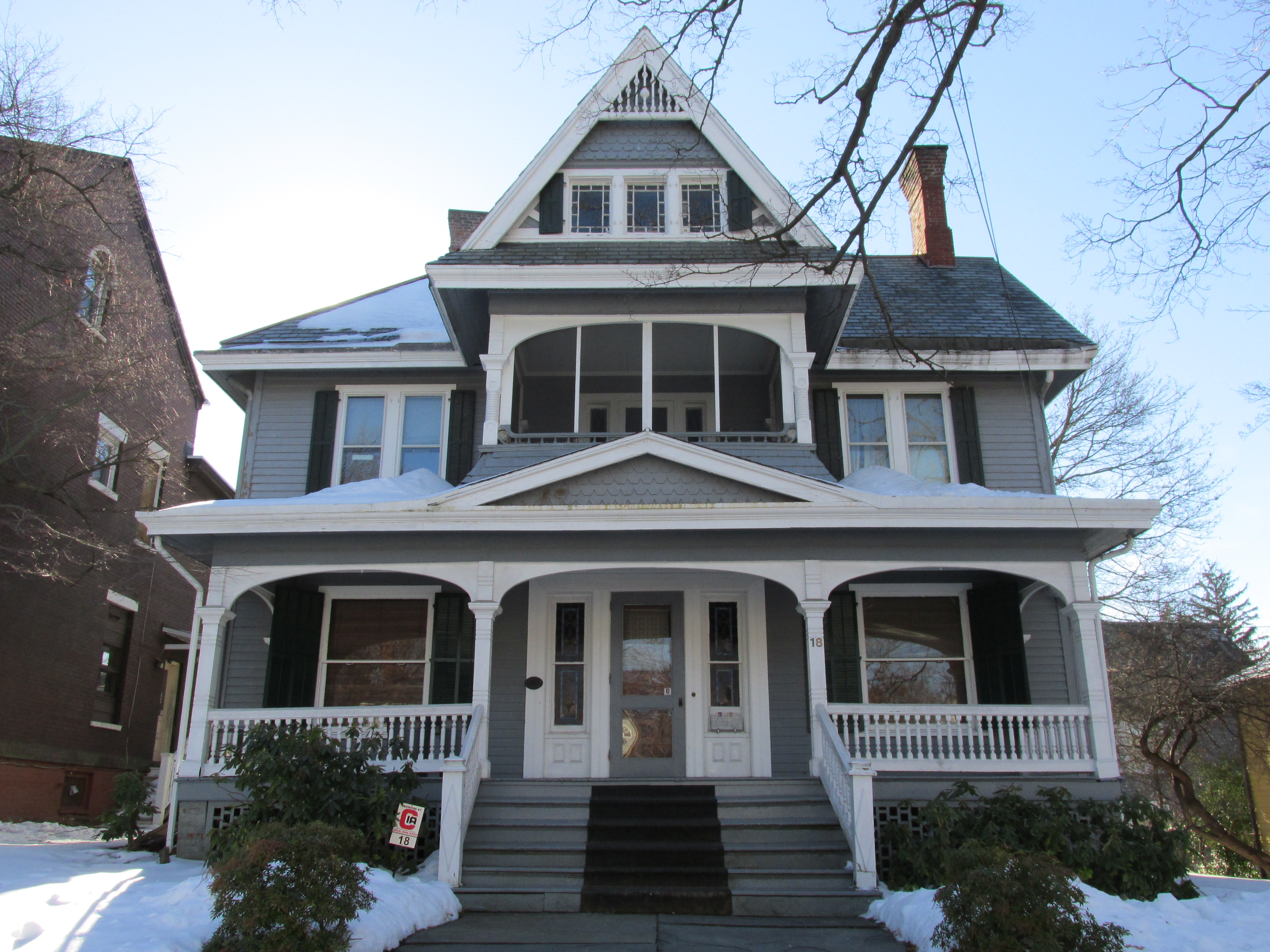
- 18 Barclay Street, January 2013

- Location within New York Location within the United States
- Location: 18 Barclay St., Poughkeepsie, New York
- Coordinates: 41°41′51″N 73°55′37″W
- Area: less than one acre
- Built: 1891
- Architectural style: Queen Anne
- MPS: Poughkeepsie MRA
- NRHP reference No.: 82001157
- Added to NRHP: November 26, 1982

Phillips House is a historic home located at Poughkeepsie, Dutchess County, New York. It was built about 1891 and is a two-story, Queen Anne–style dwelling with an asymmetrical, slate-covered roof. It features a front porch with turned posts and balusters and scalloped shingle and spool decoration.

It was added to the National Register of Historic Places in 1982.
