= Kimlin Cider Mill =

Historic mill in Poughkeepsie, New York

- U.S. National Register of Historic Places
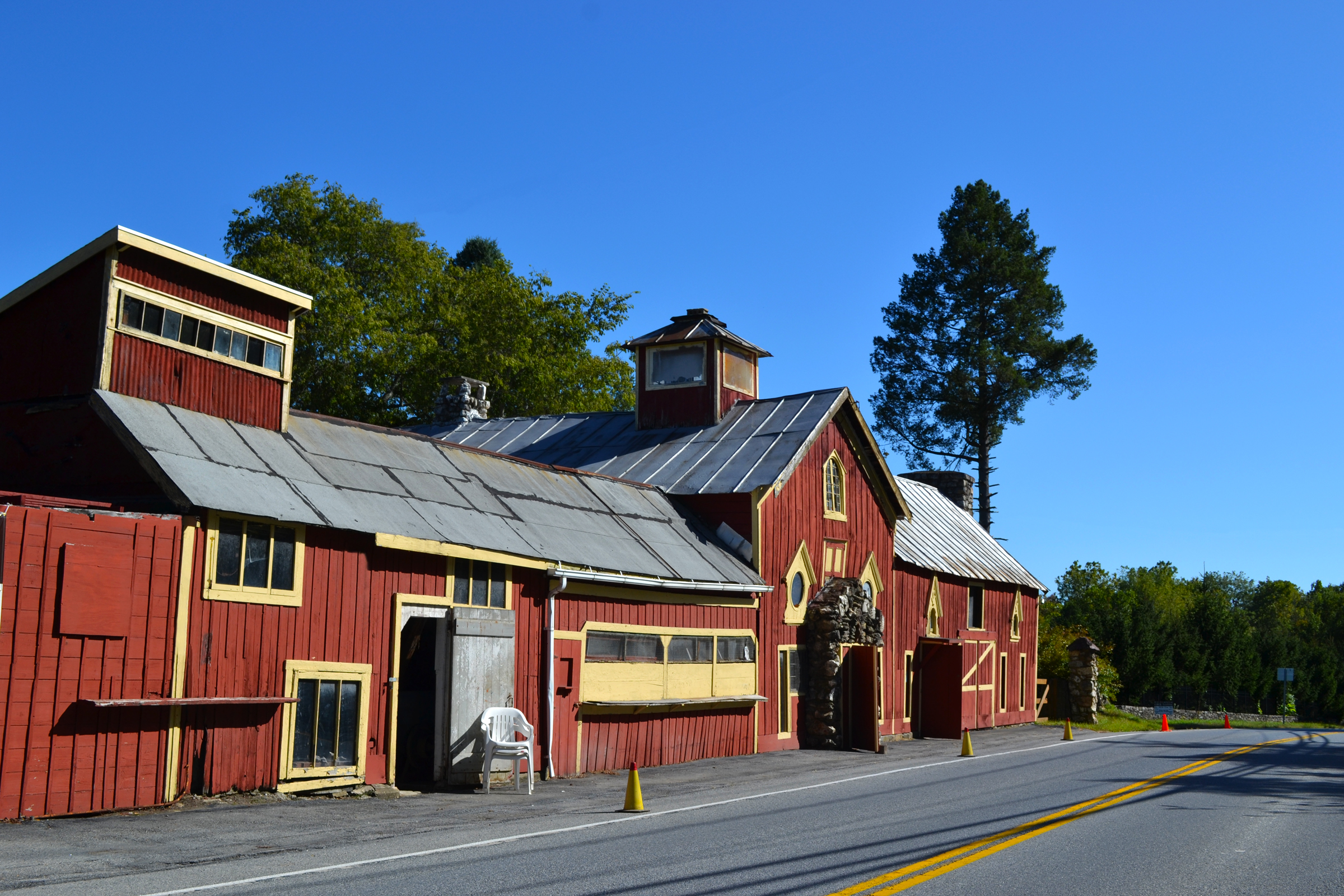
- The Mill in October 2015.

- Location within New York Location within the United States
- Location: Cedar Avenue; Poughkeepsie, New York
- Coordinates: 41°40′2″N 73°54′17″W
- NRHP reference No.: 03000020
- Added to NRHP: February 13, 2003

The Kimlin Cider Mill is located on the east side of Cedar Avenue in the Town of Poughkeepsie, New York, United States, on approximately two acres of land. A mid-19th century barn forms the core of the cider mill. The Mill was part of a larger agricultural property owned and operated by the Kimlin family since the family first came to this country from Ireland in the early 1850s. A commercial cider business at this site in the 1880s.

During the period of 1925–1935, Ralph R. Kimlin began the work of expanding the old barn to include not only the cider mill but also a public attraction including a cafe and a museum room. Mr. Kimlin greatly altered the original form and composition of the old barn. He filled the museum room with old farm tools, wildlife taxidermy, Native American artifacts, and other curiosities.

For most of the 20th century, the Kimlin Cider Mill operated as a producer and retail outlet for apple cider. Its popularity with local residents, particularly the area's schoolchildren and students from nearby Vassar College, prompted Ralph R. Kimlin to embellish the exterior of the building and to create indoor spaces for the enjoyment of his customers.

The property surrounding the Mill soon became a park. Mr. Kimlin also raised a sizable flock of sheep in the pasture behind the mill with the hopes of preserving the traditional farm life that was once an integral part of life in the area, but which was already beginning to disappear at the time.

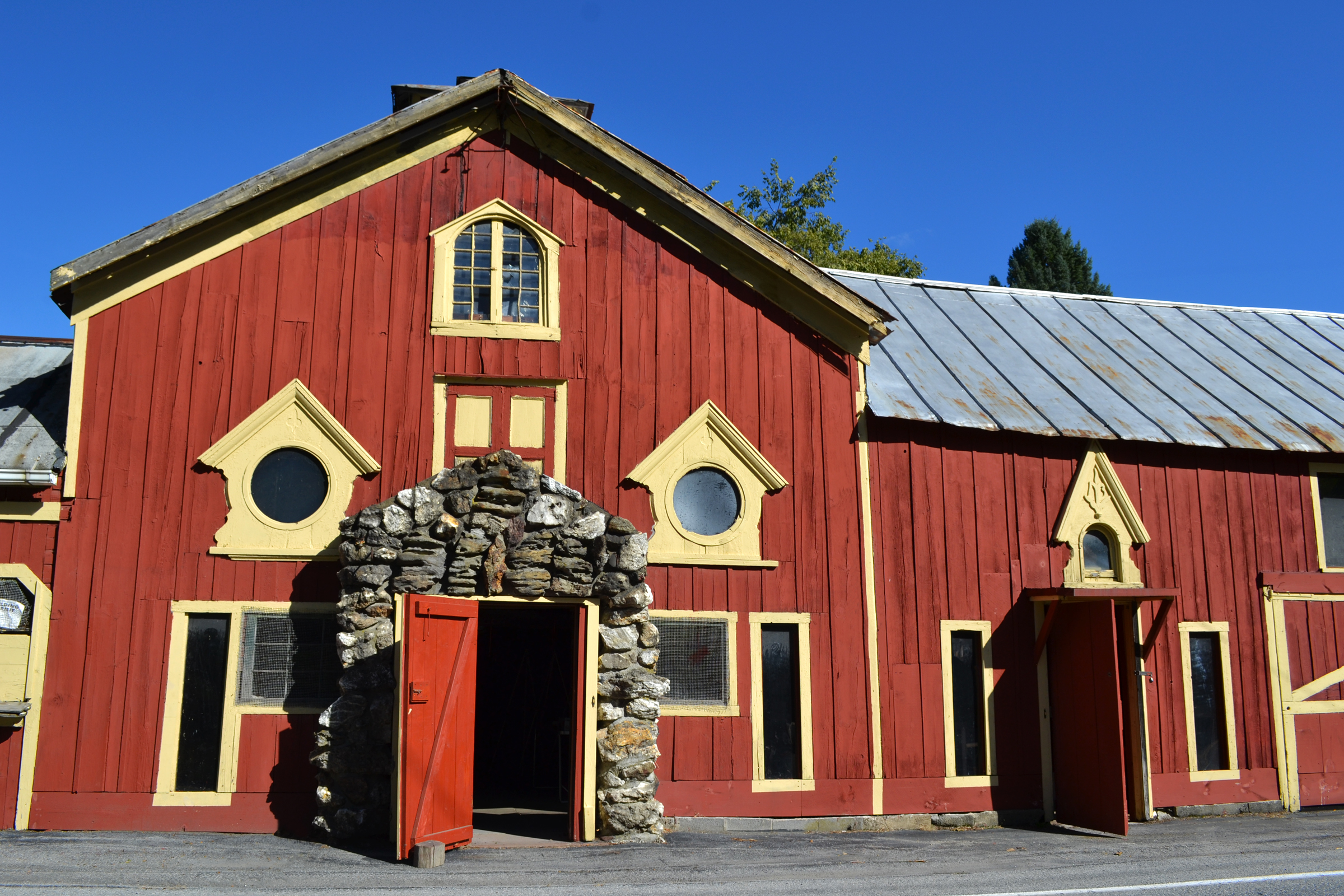
The Western Elevation (Front Door)

The Kimlin Cider Mill closed its doors in 1990. A developer purchased much of the Kimlin family property in order to redevelop it with houses.

In order to save the building and preserve its history, a grassroots citizens' group formed in May 2000 called Cider Mill Friends of Open Space & Historic Preservation, Inc., which became a 501(c)(3) non-profit organization in January 2001. On February 20, 2008, the cider mill building and surrounding 2 acres (8,100 m^{2}) of the farm were purchased by Cider Mill Friends. Cider Mill Friends then, in 2018, purchased an additional 1 acre of undeveloped former Kimlin land immediately to the north. The 2018 land acquisition was made possible through the Dutchess County Partnership for Manageable Growth Program in partnership with the Jane W. Nuhn Charitable Trust and Cider Mill Friends.

The mission of the Cider Mill Friends is to protect open space and the historic resources in the Town of Poughkeepsie through restoration and advocacy programs and land acquisition. Through the efforts of the Cider Mill Friends, the Kimlin Cider Mill has been listed on the New York State and National Registers of Historic Places and designated as a Town of Poughkeepsie Historic Landmark.

The Kimlin Cider Mill is listed on the National Register of Historic Places.
