= Boughton-Haight House =

Historic house in New York, United States

- U.S. National Register of Historic Places
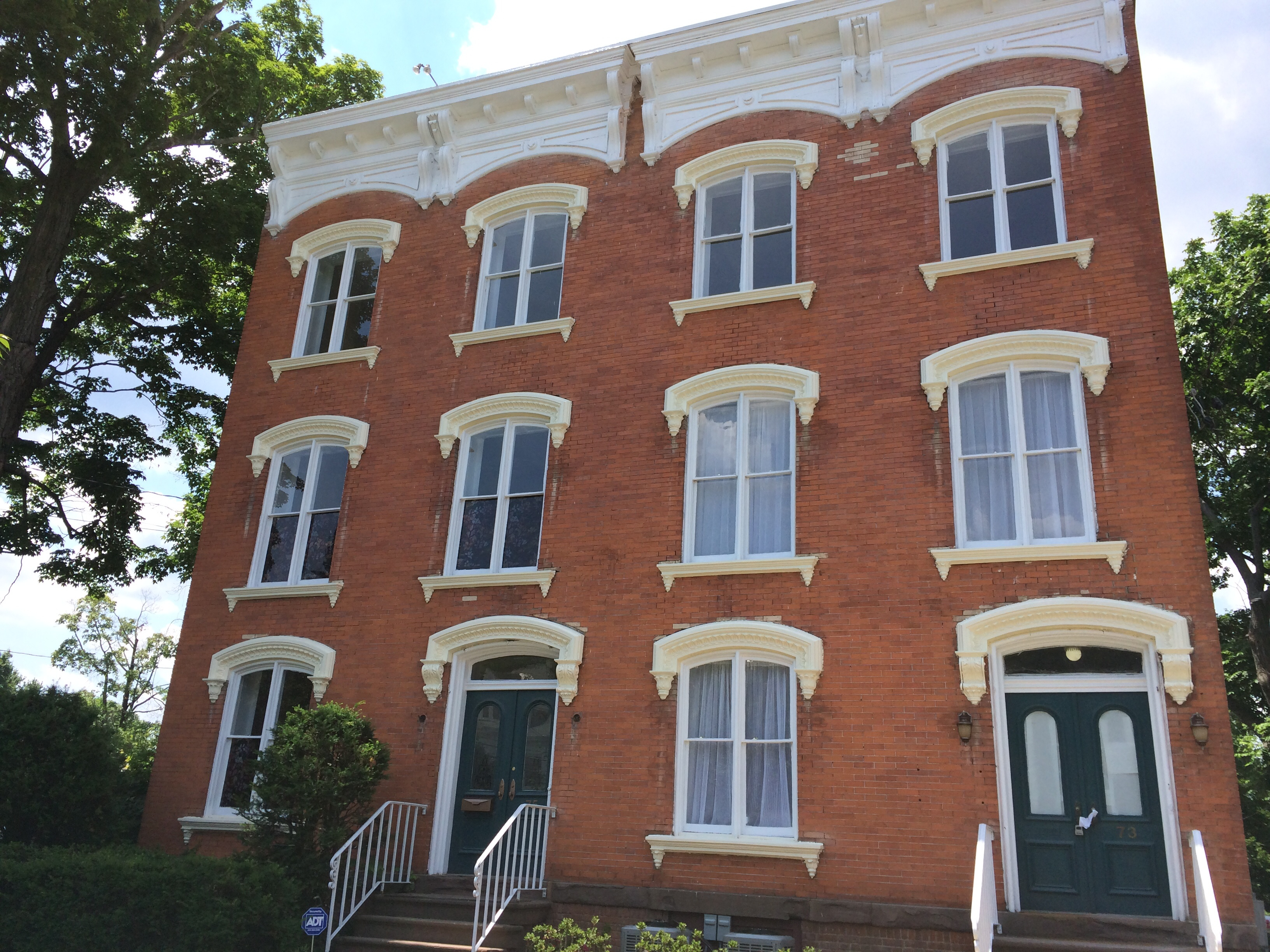

- Location within New York Location within the United States
- Location: 73-75 S. Hamilton St., Poughkeepsie, New York
- Coordinates: 41°41′53″N 73°55′34″W
- Area: less than one acre
- Built: 1875
- Architectural style: Italianate
- MPS: Poughkeepsie MRA
- NRHP reference No.: 82001124
- Added to NRHP: November 26, 1982

The Boughton-Haight House is a historic house located at 73-75 South Hamilton Street in Poughkeepsie, Dutchess County, New York.

== Description and history ==
It was built in about 1875 and is a three-story, four-bay wide, brick double townhouse designed in the Italianate style. It features round arch windows, cast iron lintels and sills, and brownstone front steps.

It was added to the National Register of Historic Places on November 26, 1982.
