= Hershkind House =

Historic house in New York, United States

- U.S. National Register of Historic Places
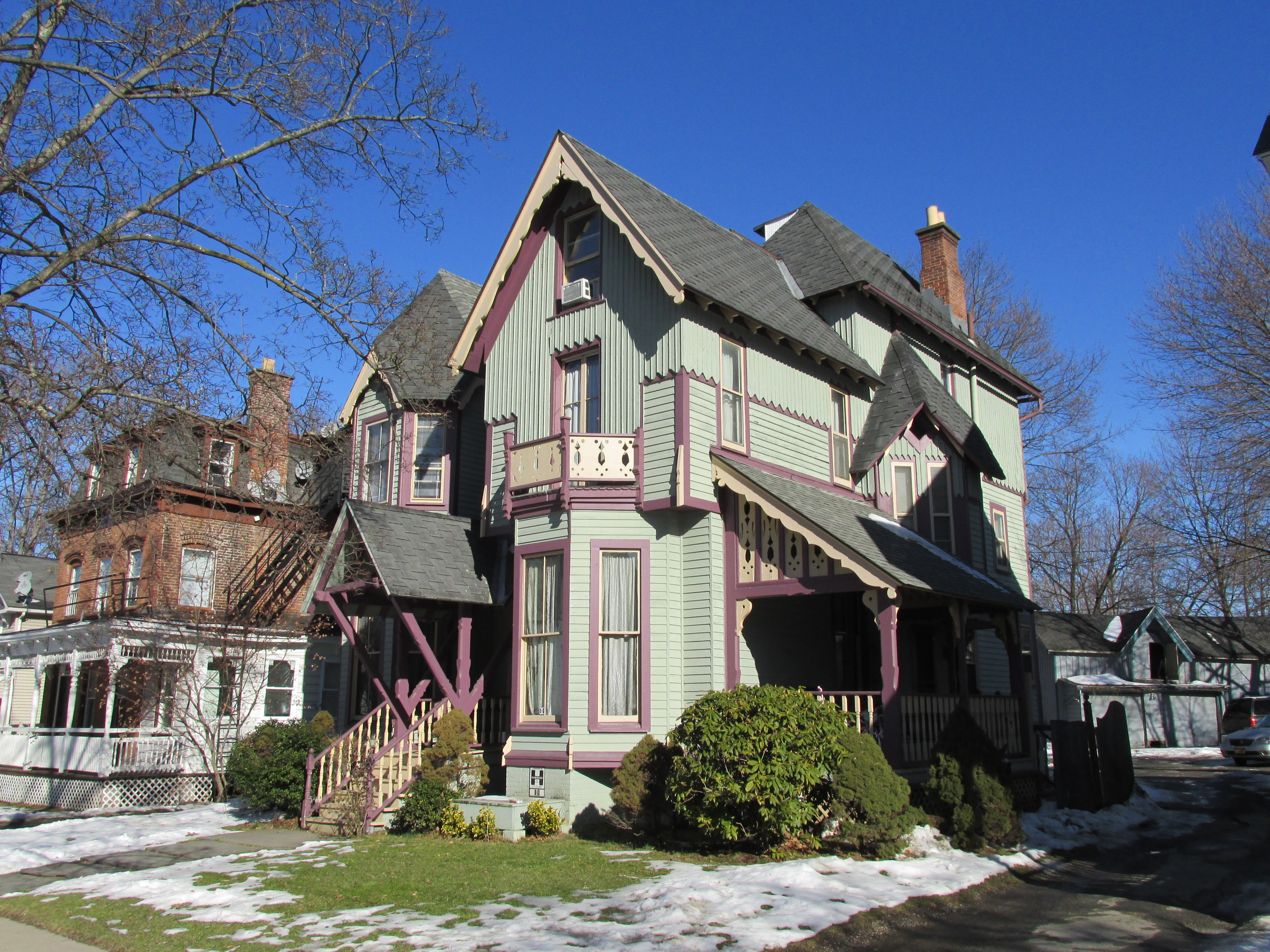
- Hershkind House, January 2013

- Location within New York Location within the United States
- Location: 30 Hooker Ave., Poughkeepsie, New York
- Coordinates: 41°41′51″N 73°55′26″W
- Area: 0.1 acres (0.040 ha)
- Built: 1885
- Architectural style: Stick/Eastlake, Swiss
- MPS: Poughkeepsie MRA
- NRHP reference No.: 82001144
- Added to NRHP: November 26, 1982

Hershkind House is a historic home located at Poughkeepsie, Dutchess County, New York. It was built about 1885 and is a 2 1/2-story, five-bay-wide Swiss chalet–style dwelling with a steeply pitched roof. It features a three-sided bay with a four-sided conical roof with V-shaped cutouts. It also has board-and-batten and clapboard siding, pierced balcony railings, and a stick style porch.

It was added to the National Register of Historic Places in 1982.
