= Thompson House (Poughkeepsie, New York) =

Historic house in New York, United States

- U.S. National Register of Historic Places
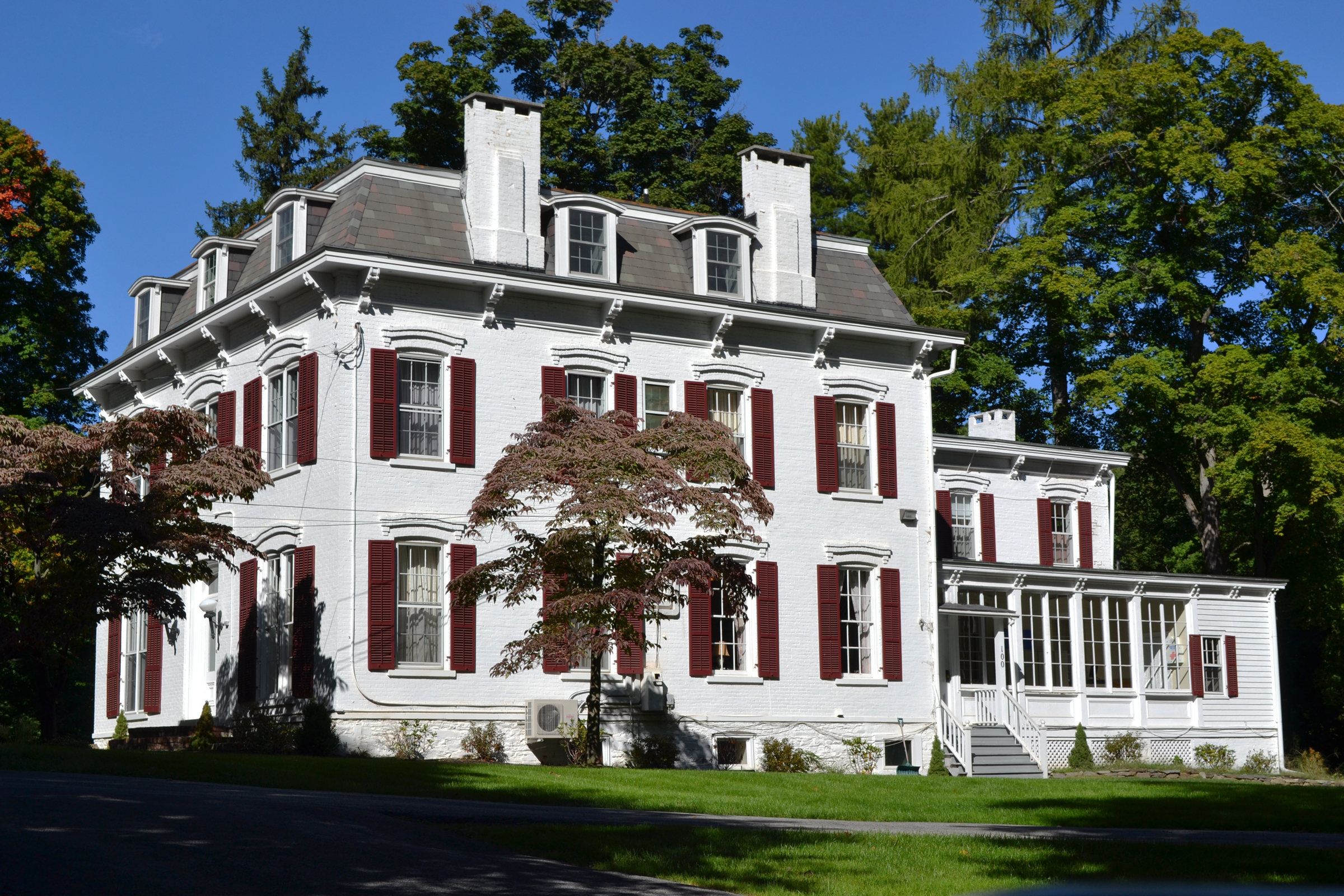
- The house in October 2015

- Location within New York Location within the United States
- Location: 100 S. Randolph Ave., Poughkeepsie, New York
- Coordinates: 41°40′53″N 73°55′14″W
- Area: less than one acre
- Built: 1880
- Architectural style: Second Empire
- MPS: Poughkeepsie MRA
- NRHP reference No.: 82001166
- Added to NRHP: November 26, 1982

Thompson House is an historic structure located in Poughkeepsie, New York. Built c. 1880, it was listed on the National Register of Historic Places on November 26, 1982. The private residence is considered to be in "excellent" condition.
