= Freer House =

Historic house in New York, United States

- U.S. National Register of Historic Places
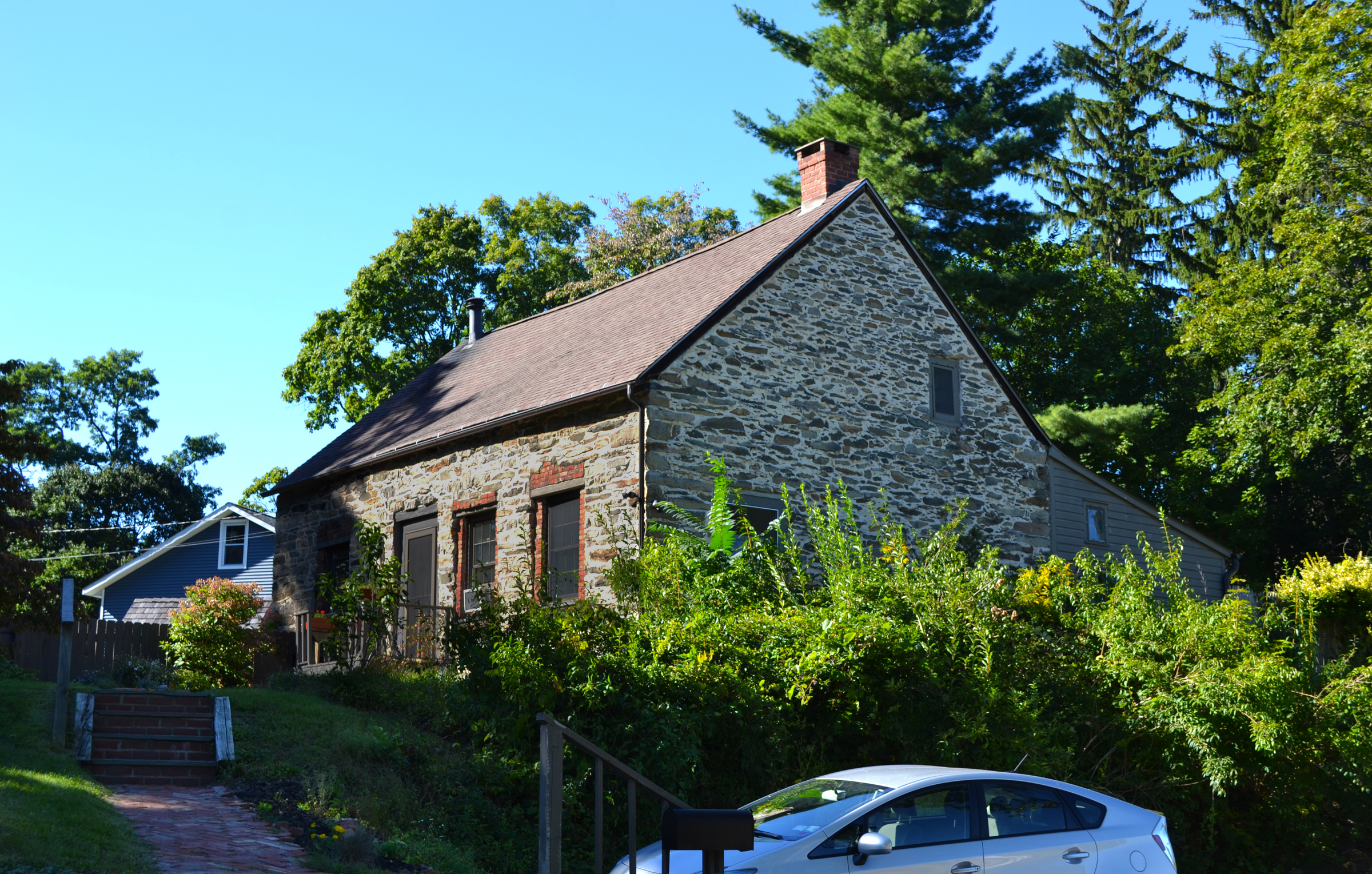
- The home in September 2015

- Location within New York Location within the United States
- Location: 70 Wilbur Blvd., Poughkeepsie, New York
- Coordinates: 41°40′46″N 73°54′38″W
- Area: less than one acre
- Built: 1728
- Architect: Freer, Simon
- Architectural style: 18th Century Cottage
- MPS: Poughkeepsie MRA
- NRHP reference No.: 82001138
- Added to NRHP: November 26, 1982

Freer House is a historic home located at Poughkeepsie, Dutchess County, New York. It was built about 1728 and is a 1 1/2-story, four-bay-wide frame farmers cottage built of coursed fieldstone. It is the oldest extant structure in the City of Poughkeepsie.

It was added to the National Register of Historic Places in 1982.
