= Corlies–Hart–Ritter House =

Historic house in New York, United States

- U.S. National Register of Historic Places
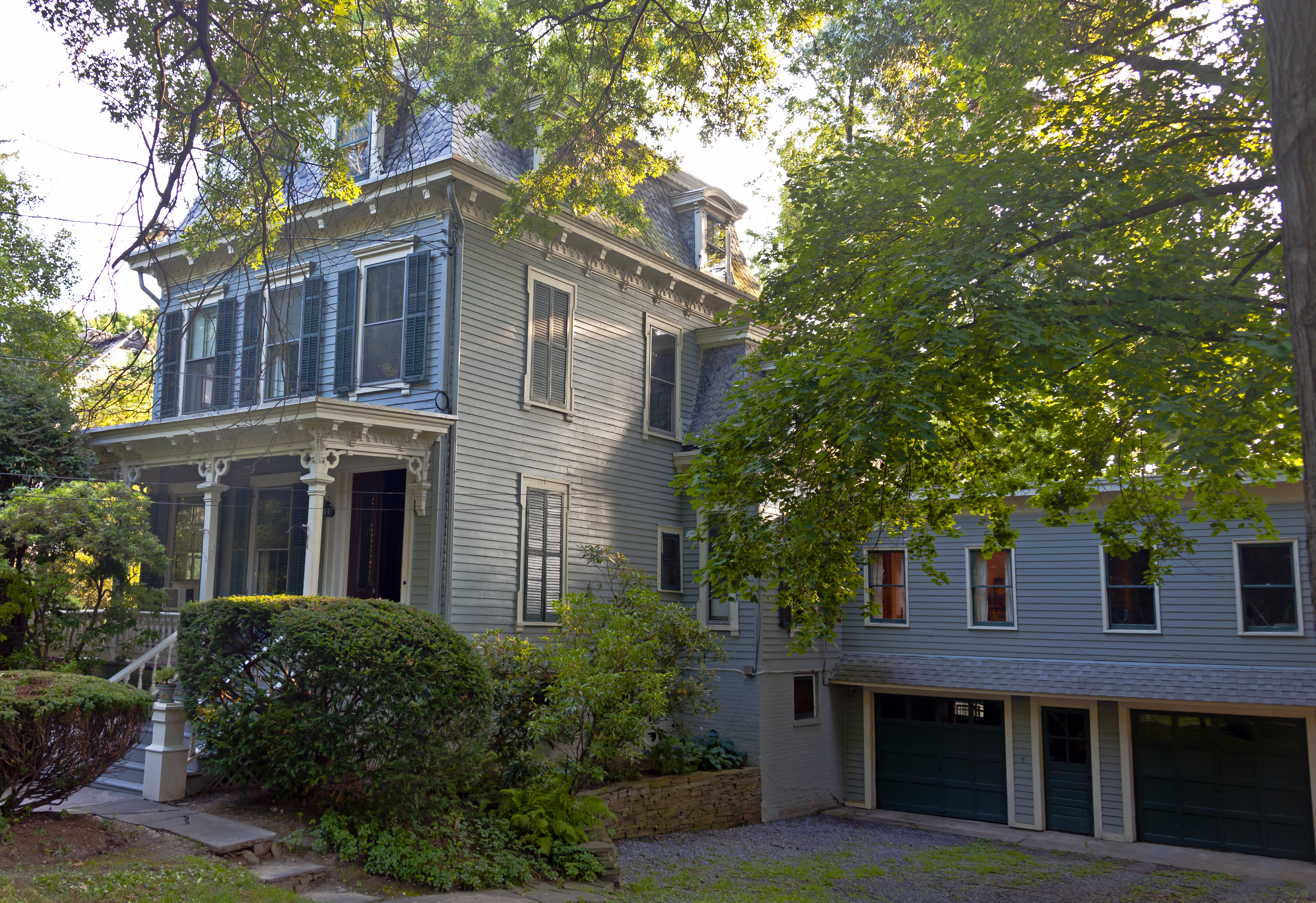
- Corlies–Hart–Ritter House, August 2014

- Location within New York Location within the United States
- Location: 103 S. Hamilton St., Poughkeepsie, New York
- Coordinates: 41°41′42″N 73°55′42″W
- Area: 0.73 acres (0.30 ha)
- Built: c. 1872
- Architect: James H. Seaman
- Architectural style: Second Empire
- NRHP reference No.: 14000486
- Added to NRHP: August 18, 2014

Corlies–Hart–Ritter House is a historic home located at Poughkeepsie, Dutchess County, New York. It was built about 1872, and is a 2 1/2-story, Second Empire style frame dwelling with a 1 1/2-story rear section. A garage was added about 1920. It has a fishscale slate-covered, concave-shaped mansard roof. The front façade features a full-width, one-story, flat-roofed, porch. It was home to three successive families important in local musical history.

It was added to the National Register of Historic Places in 2013.
