= Vassar-Warner Row =

Historic houses in New York, United States

- U.S. National Register of Historic Places
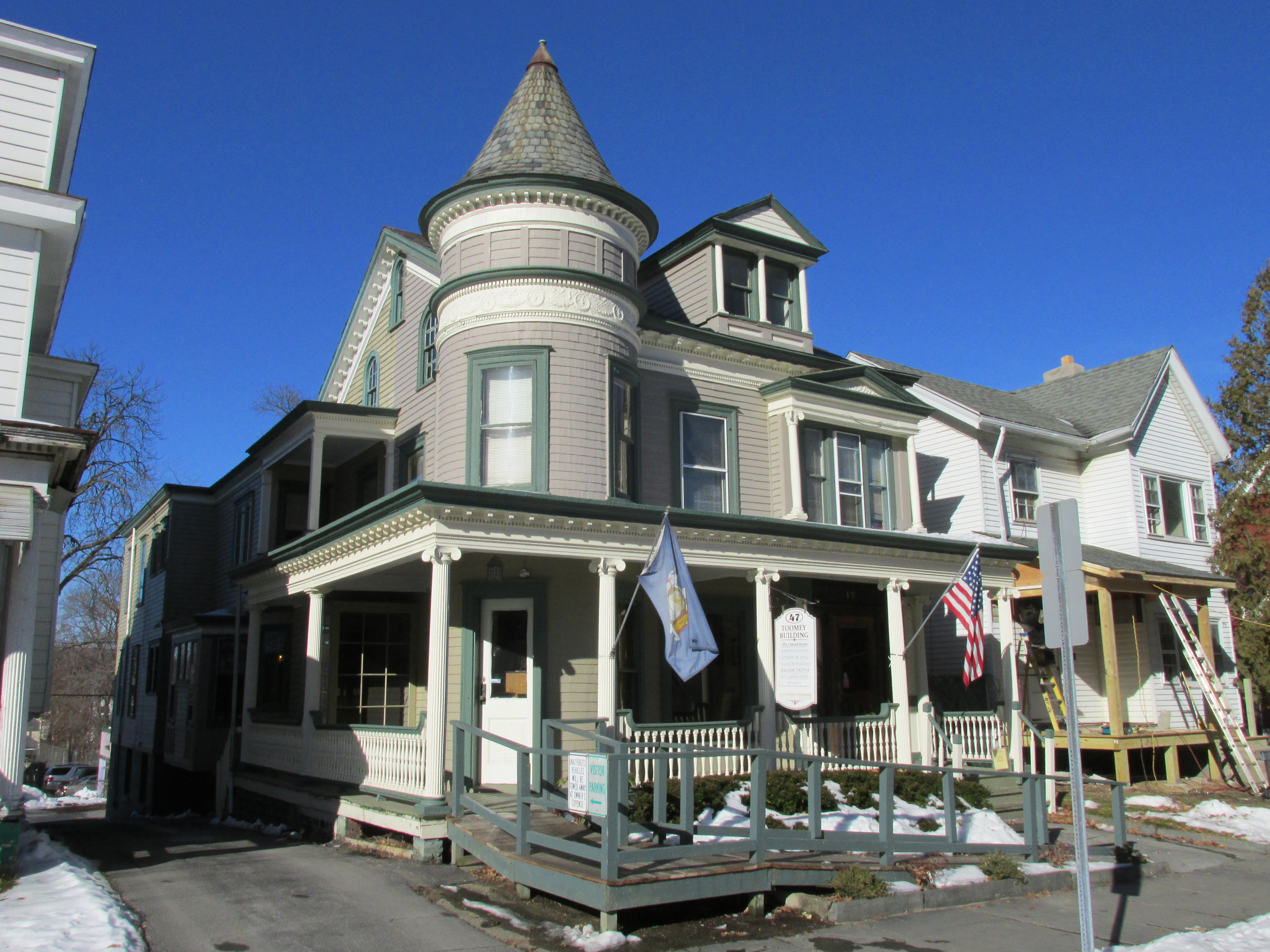
- Toomey Building, January 2013

- Location within New York Location within the United States
- Location: S. Hamilton from Montgomery to 40 Hamilton St., Poughkeepsie, New York
- Coordinates: 41°41′58″N 73°55′30″W
- Area: 2 acres (0.81 ha)
- Architect: Wheeler, Corydon
- Architectural style: Greek Revival, Queen Anne
- MPS: Poughkeepsie MRA
- NRHP reference No.: 82001170
- Added to NRHP: November 26, 1982

Vassar-Warner Row is a set of historic homes located at Poughkeepsie, Dutchess County, New York. Included in the row is the Vassar-Warner Home, built in 1837 in the Greek Revival style. It is a three-story, massive brick structure with a wing designed in 1898 by Corydon Wheeler. Also in the row are three Queen Anne style residences.

It was added to the National Register of Historic Places in 1982.
