= Violet Avenue School =

- U.S. National Register of Historic Places
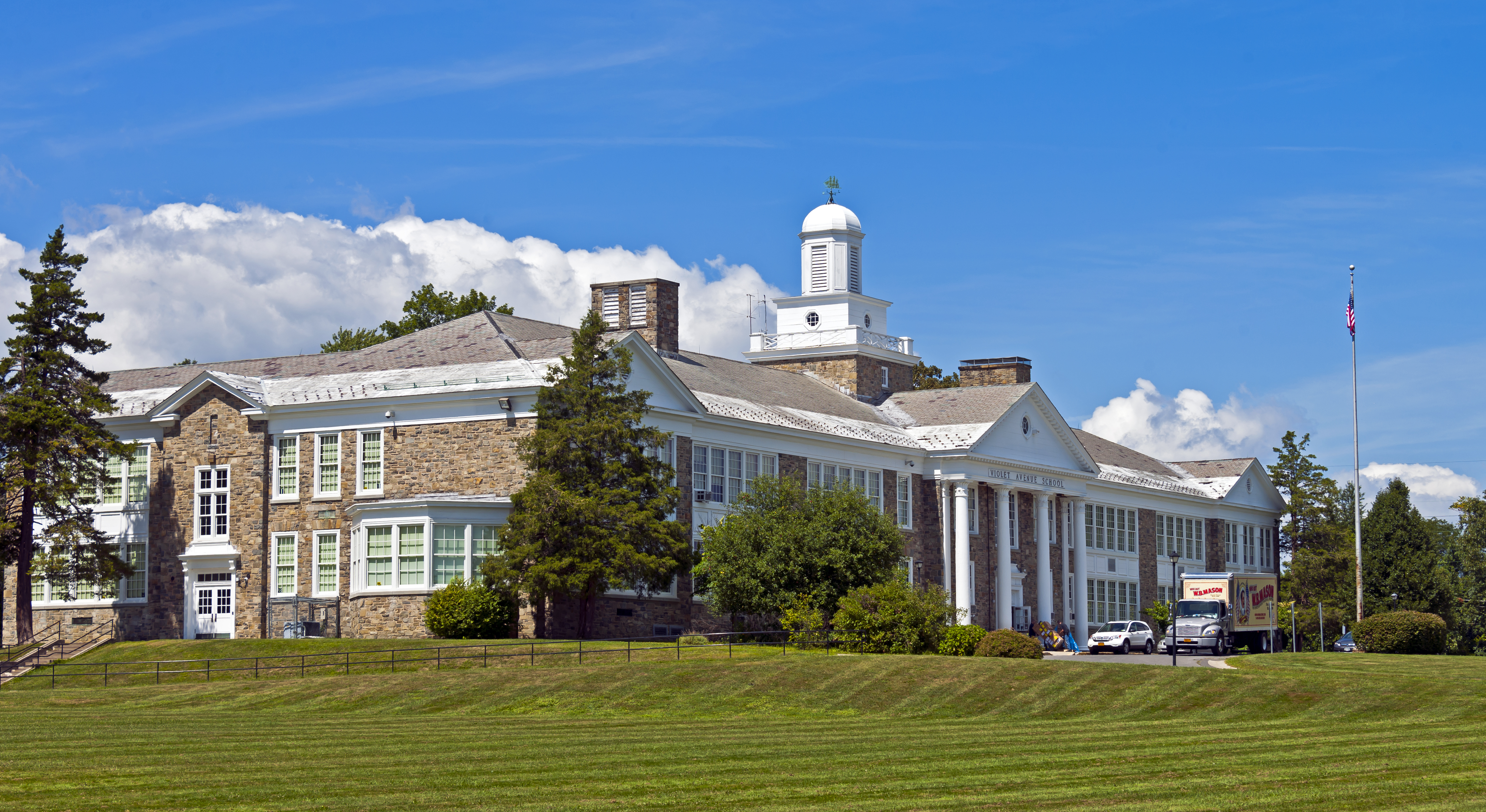
- Violet Avenue School, August 2014

- Location within New York Location within the United States
- Location: 191 Violet Ave., Poughkeepsie, New York
- Coordinates: 41°43′40″N 73°54′43″W
- Area: 9.1 acres (3.7 ha)
- Built: 1939-1940
- Built by: Caulway, Inc.
- Architect: Charles J. Cooke
- Architectural style: Colonial Revival
- NRHP reference No.: 14000488
- Added to NRHP: August 18, 2014

Violet Avenue School is a historic school building located at Poughkeepsie, Dutchess County, New York. It was built in 1939–1940, and is a two-story, five part, Colonial Revival style school building with load-bearing bluestone walls. It consists of a central tetrastyle portico entry block flanked by four wings. The central section features a central two-story classical portico with four columns with Corinthian order capitals and a prominent domed cupola. The school was built under the auspices of the Public Works Administration and President Franklin Delano Roosevelt was influential in the design.

It was added to the National Register of Historic Places in 2013.
