= Harvey G. Eastman =

American politician

Harvey Gridley Eastman (October 16, 1832 – July 13, 1878) was an American educator and politician from New York.

== Life ==
Born in Marshall, New York, Eastman was the son of Horace Haveland Eastman and Mary A. Gridley. Eastman began his professional career teaching at Eastman Commercial College in Rochester, New York, which had been founded by his uncle, George Washington Eastman. In December 1855, he founded a school of his own in Oswego. He married Mary Minerva Clark on June 5, 1857.

He moved his school to St. Louis, Missouri in spring of 1858, but due to unfortunate hiring of abolitionist teachers in pro-slavery Missouri, was forced to move again, ultimately establishing the Eastman Business College in Poughkeepsie, New York, on November 3, 1859. Through Eastman's tireless promotion, the school eventually became one of the largest commercial schools in the United States.

The school made him rich, and he became one of the leading citizens of Poughkeepsie. He was Mayor of Poughkeepsie, New York from 1871 to 1874, and again from 1877 until his death. His tenure as mayor is most notable in his ensuring the construction of a water filtration plant that eliminated Poughkeepsie's reputation as "The Sickly City."

Eastman was a member of the New York State Assembly (Dutchess Co., 2nd D.) in 1872 and 1874, his primary mission there being to secure funding for a bridge across the Hudson River.

Suffering from ill health, Eastman traveled to Denver, Colorado and died there. Eastman was a first cousin of George Washington Eastman's son George Eastman, of Eastman-Kodak fame.

== See also ==
- List of mayors of Poughkeepsie, New York

New York State Assembly
Preceded by David H. Mulford	New York State Assembly; Dutchess County, 2nd District; 1872	Succeeded by Jacob B. Carpenter
Preceded by Jacob B. Carpenter	New York State Assembly; Dutchess County, 2nd District; 1874	Succeeded by Benjamin S. Broas
