= Garfield Place Historic District =

Historic district in New York, United States

- U.S. National Register of Historic Places
- U.S. Historic district
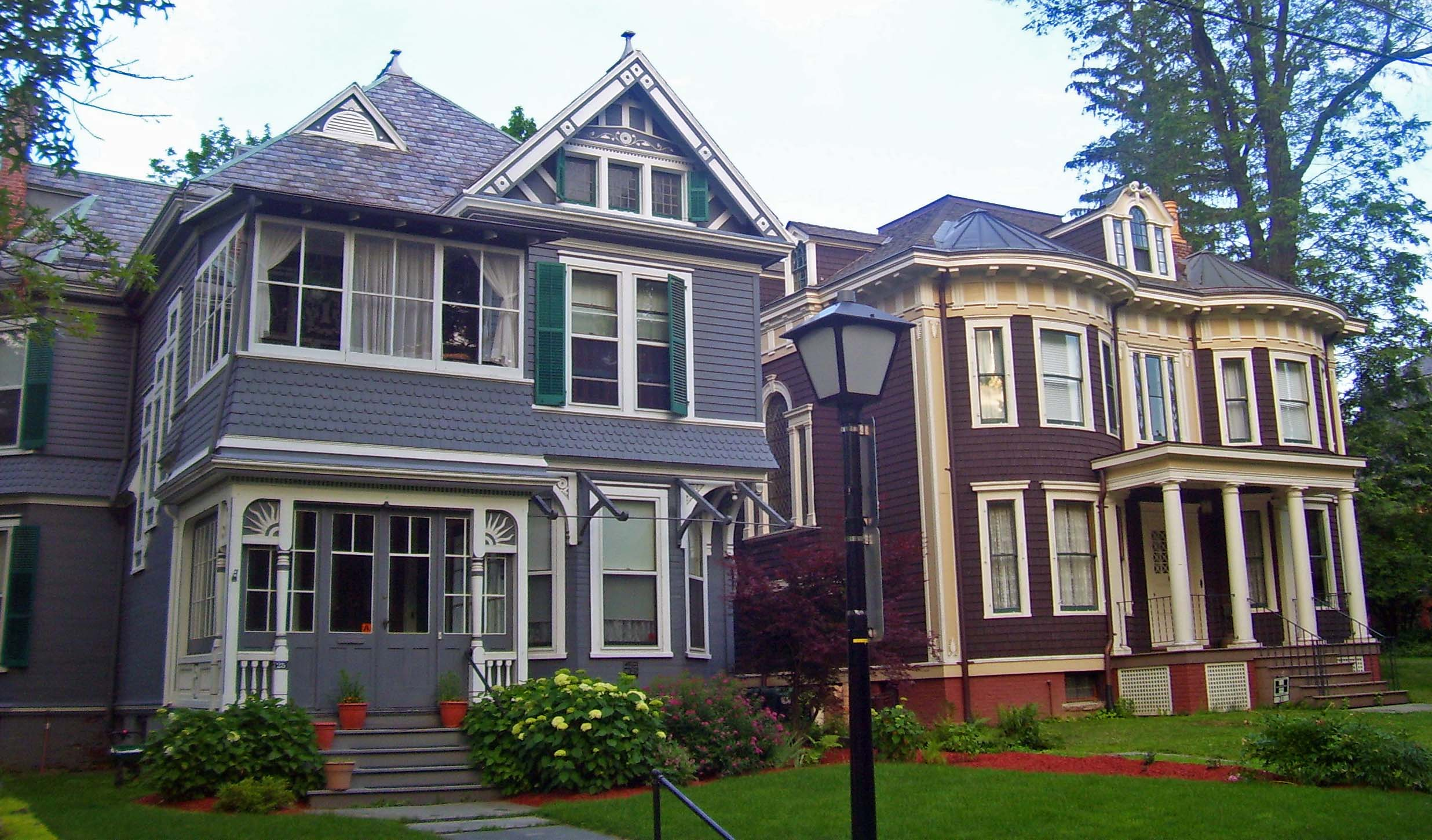
- Houses on Garfield Place, 2008

- Location within New York Location within the United States
- Location: Poughkeepsie, NY
- Coordinates: 41°41′53″N 73°55′46″W
- Area: 20 acres (8.1 ha)
- Built: mid-19th century
- Architectural style: Victorian
- NRHP reference No.: 72000832
- Added to NRHP: 1972

The Garfield Place Historic District is a small residential neighborhood in southern Poughkeepsie, New York, United States. It is a 20-acre (8.1 ha) area covering all properties on Garfield Place, which runs for two blocks between Franklin and Montgomery streets, as well as some on nearby sections of Montgomery and Barclay. In 1972 it was listed on the National Register of Historic Places.

Today's Garfield Place was originally part of a 53-acre (21 ha) area known as the "Little Commons", owned by the van Kleeck family, when Poughkeepsie was incorporated as a village in 1799. In the first decades of the new century, it grew rapidly and a man named Bronson French bought a portion of the Little Commons. In turn he sold it to a partnership of four local businessmen in 1836, who saw it as desirable for upscale homes since it was close to the center of the village and situated on a hill with commanding views of the Hudson River.

They surveyed the property and subdivided it into building lots shortly afterward. At auction, the lots sold for an average of $25 per square foot. However, the Panic of 1837 slowed the economy shortly afterwards, and ground was not broken until the early 1850s when Joseph Corlies, one of the partners, built himself the house at 28 Garfield as a demonstration of what sort of home could be built on the new street.

Others followed, lured by advertising that cited the quietness of the streets, the view of the river and its proximity to the growing city's downtown. By the 1880s South Liberty Street had been pretty much built out. In 1881, the street's name was changed to Garfield Place in memory of recently assassinated President James A. Garfield. The last lots would be developed in the early 20th century.

The houses continued to remain among the city's most desirable addresses, and later on a carriage house originally built for Corlies' home was converted into another residence, 30 Garfield. The street's success as one of the city's first historic districts led the residents of neighboring Academy Street to seek the same status in 1982. It is subject to special architectural rules enforced by the city's Historic District and Landmark Preservation Commission (HDLPC).
