= Poughkeepsie City Hall =

- U.S. National Register of Historic Places
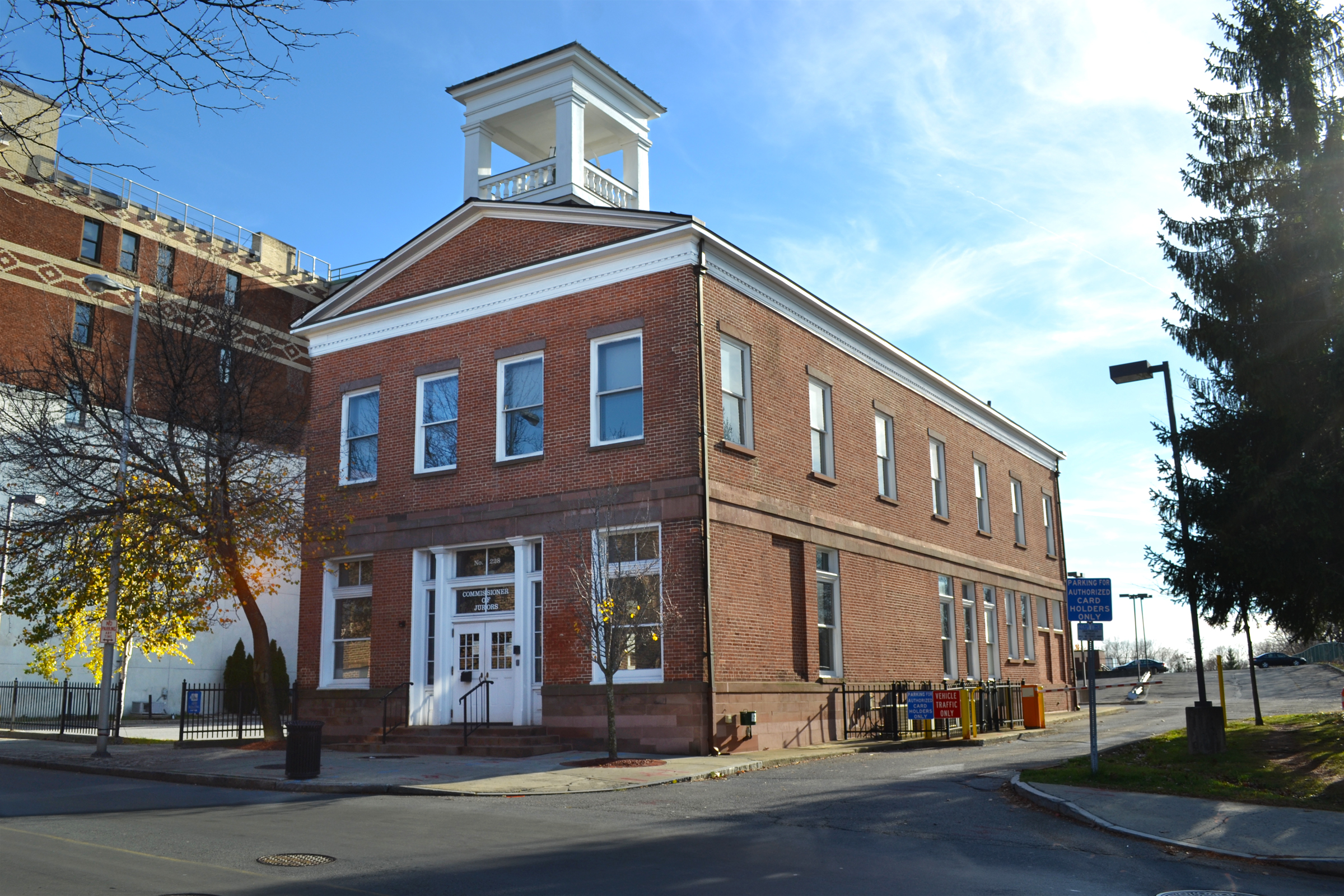
- The former city hall in November 2015. The building is currently used as the Commissioner of Jurors Office.

- Location within New York Location within the United States
- Location: 228 Main St., Poughkeepsie, New York
- Coordinates: 41°42′14″N 73°55′48″W
- Area: less than one acre
- Built: 1831
- Architectural style: Greek Revival
- NRHP reference No.: 72000835
- Added to NRHP: January 20, 1972

Poughkeepsie City Hall is a historic city hall located in Poughkeepsie, Dutchess County, New York at 228 Main Street. It was built in 1831 and is a two-story, red brick building with a basement and attic, in the Greek Revival style. It has a gable roof with a rooftop belfry with square columns, spindle balustrade, and slate covered hipped roof. It is currently used as the Commissioner of Jurors Office.

It was added to the National Register of Historic Places in 1972.

Poughkeepsie's current city hall stands around the corner at Civic Center Plaza and is constructed in the brutalist style.

== History ==
The building was constructed when Poughkeepsie was still a village, with the intention of having a fish market on the first floor and a village hall on the second. It cost $7,200 ($162,000 in 2016) to build in addition to the $7,000 to acquire the land parcels for the project. When Poughkeepsie became incorporated as a city in 1854, the building then became known as city hall. In 1865, the space was remodeled for use as the Poughkeepsie Post Office, where it operated until 1886 after the completion of a new post office building around the corner on Market Street. A newspaper operated there for a short time after until the city needed the space to accommodate more municipal offices. In 1943, then-mayor Daniel Wilbur proposed to raze the aging structure and replace it with a grand municipal building akin in style to the New York Public Library in Manhattan. The proposed replacement was never built but the structure was refurbished the following year. The exterior paint was sandblasted to show the original brick color and brownstone elements were added. The building was acquired by the county government in 1972 when the city government moved to the current city hall. The county planned to demolish it and create a parking lot for the nearby county offices but several members of the public opposed this and pushed for the building to be reused. The county struggled to find a stable tenant for the building until the 1990s when it was finally renovated for use as the Commissioner of Jurors Office. The building still has its tin ceilings and the original bell remains in the belfry. The old city hall is the only public building that remains from the years when Poughkeepsie was still a village.

== See also ==
- List of mayors of Poughkeepsie, New York
