= Academy Street Historic District (Poughkeepsie, New York) =

Historic district in New York, United States

- U.S. National Register of Historic Places
- U.S. Historic district
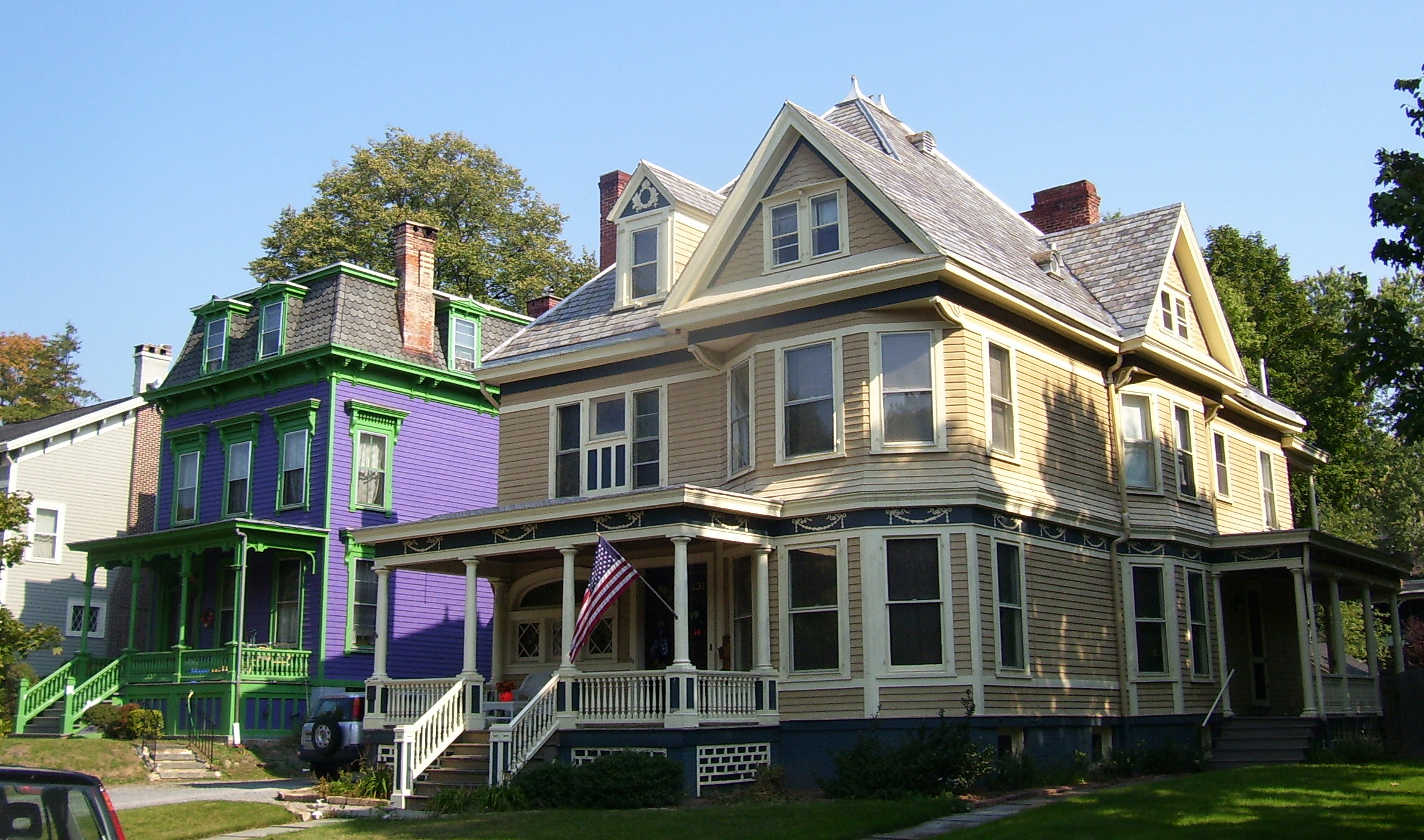
- Restored houses on Academy Street, 2007
- Location: Poughkeepsie, NY
- Coordinates: 41°41′36″N 73°55′44″W
- Area: 140 acres (56 ha)
- Built: 19th and 20th centuries
- Architect: William J. Beardsley, Percival Lloyd, William Appleton Potter
- Architectural style: Greek Revival architecture, Hudson River Bracketed, Second Empire, Queen Anne, Eastern Stick-Eastlake, Colonial Revival
- MPS: Poughkeepsie Multiple Resources
- NRHP reference No.: 82001117
- Added to NRHP: 1982

The Academy Street Historic District is a historic district located along that street between Livingston and Montgomery streets in the city of Poughkeepsie, New York, United States. It is a few blocks from US 9, just northeast of Springside, Matthew Vassar's never-completed estate that is now a National Historic Landmark.

Its 140 acres (56 ha) contain 46 buildings, mostly houses, in a variety of 19th and early 20th-century architectural styles. It was the first planned neighborhood in the city.

Originally part of Bronson Smith's 1805 farm, the land today part of the district was sold to a group of speculators in 1836. While the financial crisis that ensued the following year set back home construction, later on in the 19th century the purchase proved fruitful as many, many homes were built on it in a mix of styles, with houses near the north end of the district, closer to downtown Poughkeepsie, having smaller lots and yards than the ones further away. Christ Church, also built during this time, remains largely unaltered and is considered a contributing property.

In the late 1970s, 85% of the residents voted in favor of establishing the district, after seeing how successful the nearby Garfield Place Historic District had been at enhancing property values and preserving that neighborhood's historic character. It was added to the National Register of Historic Places in 1982. The district designation has spurred the redevelopment and restoration of homes within and has been used as a selling point by real estate agents.

Today it is one of three historic districts recognized under city zoning and subject to special architectural rules enforced by the city's Historic District and Landmark Preservation Commission (HDLPC). The HDLPC's jurisdiction over the district is not supreme; in 1986 the New York State Department of Environmental Conservation ruled that the city's Planning Board was to be lead agency and have primary jurisdiction over a proposed 18-unit condominium complex within the district.

Notable former residents include William Allen Adriance (154 Academy St), farming equipment manufacturer, father of actress Jan Sterling, and founder of Adriance Memorial Library, the main public library in Poughkeepsie.
