= Adriance Memorial Library =

Library in Poughkeepsie, New York, US

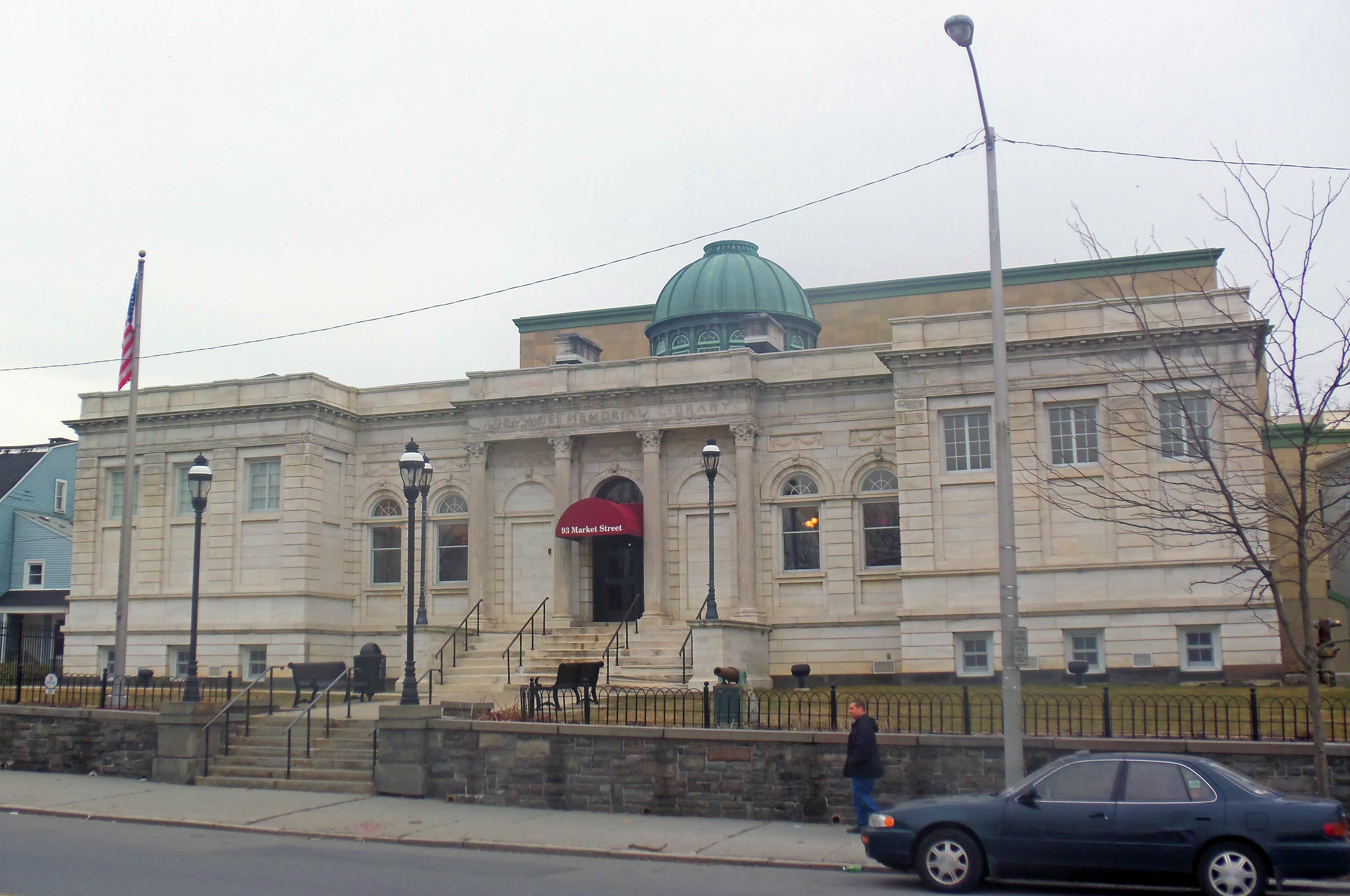
- Building in 2013, after renovations and expansions
- 41°42′2″N 73°55′49″W
- Location: Poughkeepsie, NY, USA
- Type: Public
- Established: 1897
- Branches: 2 (Arlington, Poughkeepsie)

Collection
- Items collected: Books, periodicals, electronic media

Access and use
- Access requirements: Resident of city or town of Poughkeepsie
- Circulation: 415,000 (2010)
- Population served: 73,000

Other information
- Director: Tom Lawrence
- Website: Poughkeepsie Public Library District
- Adriance Memorial Library
- U.S. National Register of Historic Places
- Built: 1896
- Built by: Titus & Round (of Poughkeepsie)
- Architect: Charles F. Rose
- Architectural style: Classical Revival
- MPS: Poughkeepsie MRA
- NRHP reference No.: 82001118
- Added to NRHP: November 26, 1982

The Adriance Memorial Library is located on Market Street in Poughkeepsie, New York, United States. It is a stone building in the Classical Revival architectural style erected shortly at the end of the 19th century. In 1982 it was listed on the National Register of Historic Places.

It is the oldest tax-supported library in the state and the third oldest in the United States, dating back to 1839 at various locations prior to the construction of the current building. It is also the main public library of the Poughkeepsie Public Library District, serving the city and town of that name, with a branch in the suburb of Arlington and a branch located at the Family Partnership Center on North Hamilton Street in Poughkeepsie. It is a member library of the Mid-Hudson Library System, which has its headquarters next door.

The building has been through two renovations and expansions. A large rear wing was built in the 1920s. It was removed in the early 21st century to make way for an even larger addition. During that time the main building was closed as well for renovations. It was reopened in 2009 with its appearance and layout intact.

== Building ==
The library is located on the east side of Market Street between Noxon and Pine streets, just north of where Market forks to its south end at Montgomery Street. A block and a half to the north is Church Street (eastbound U.S. Route 44/New York State Route 55), Poughkeepsie's major eastbound arterial road and the south end of downtown. The area is extensively developed and urban, along the point where the terrain levels off after rising a half-mile (800 m) from the Hudson River to the west.

Nearby are several other buildings also listed on the National Register. To the southwest, across the fork of Market, is the Harlow Row, a group of attached brick rowhouses slightly older than the library. Across Market is the Market Street Row, a group of several houses, including the Mott–Van Kleeck House, the city's oldest. North along the same side of Market is the Romanesque Revival brick Hasbrouck House, now headquarters of the Dutchess County United Way, with the brick Colonial Revival Amrita Club next to it at the corner of Church, opposite the city's former armory.

A stone retaining wall, topped by a small decorative guardrail, runs along the street, broken by a set of steps in the center flanked by gas lampposts. The building itself is a one-story, 13-bay structure of Tennessee marble with a parapeted roof, projecting cornice with modillions, plain frieze with "Adriance Memorial Library" carved into it. Atop is a small green dome.

On the west (front) facade the seven bays in the middle are recessed. Within that section the middle three project slightly to form a central pavilion with four round fluted Corinthian columns. A double set of steps leads up to the main entrance.

The entrance bay has a round-arched glass transom with radiating muntins, topped with a scroll keystone. It is flanked by two similar blind bays. Above each is a panel with swag decorations.

Outside the colonnade, each side has two flanking windows. They have similar decorative treatment as the central bays, but are set with one-over-one double-hung sash above a recessed panel. On the sides, windows are set with two eight-pane casements, opening in the center, above a recessed panel. A stringcourse is at the bottom, paralleled by the building's water table. Below them on the sides are square two-over-two double-hung sash in the basement.

A parged brick hyphen, two stories with two bays set with one-over-one double-hung sash between limestone sills and lintels, trimmed with a molded wooden cornice, connects the main block to a rear addition built of smooth dressed stone blocks, rusticated on the first story. It is four storeys high, with a three-story front section, and a projecting rear. The front has modern paired windows with two small panes over one large one. Similar windows alternate on the addition's main block, and rise near the east corner of the rear section. The flat roof is trimmed with a cornice similar to that on the hyphen.

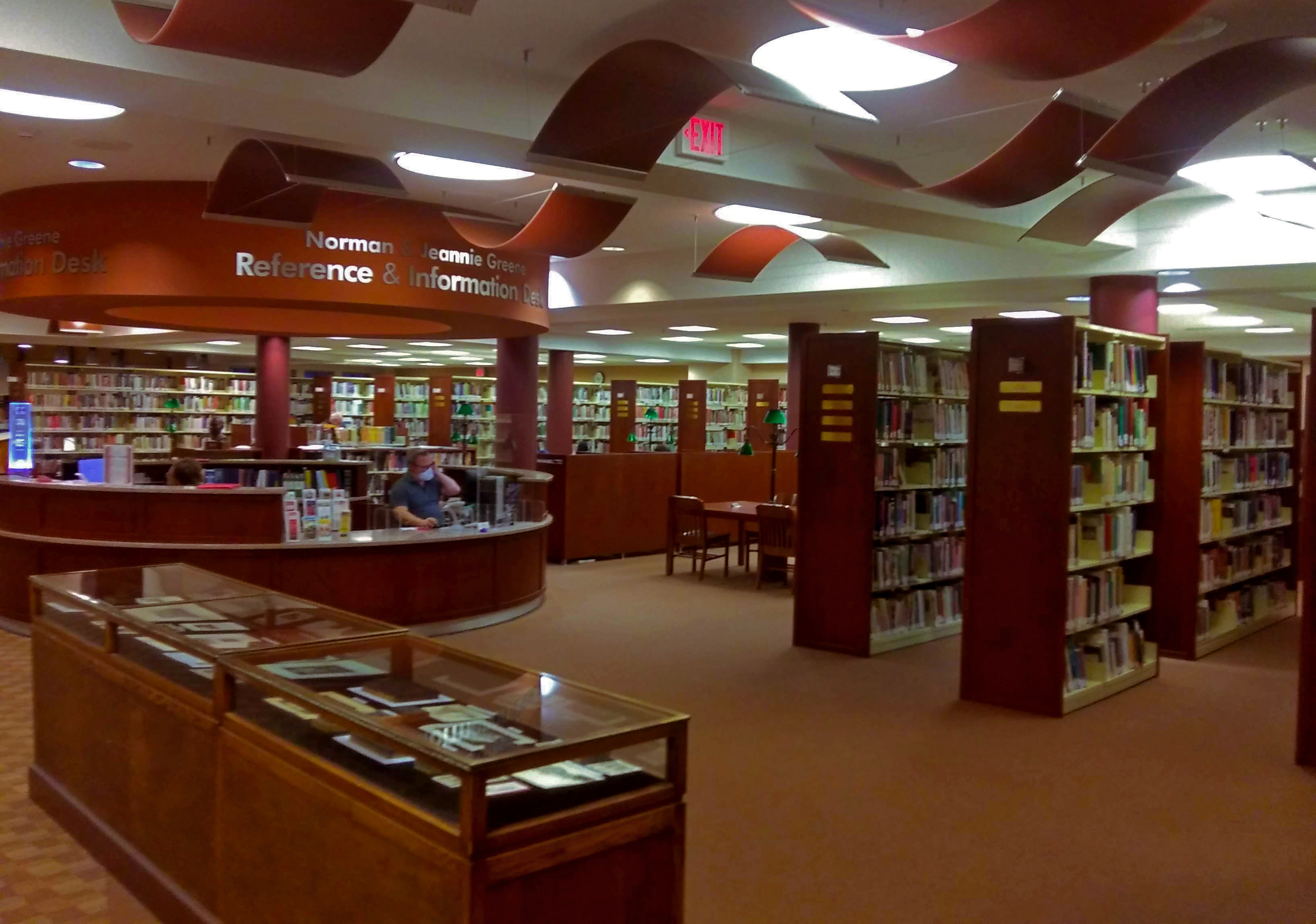
Main reading room, in 2022

The interior features Tiffany brass plaques and intact oak woodwork. The library's annual report described it as a Renaissance Revival building, but today it is more frequently described as Classical Revival.

== History ==
The Adriance Memorial library was given to the city of Poughkeepsie by the Adriance family, who ran a successful farm equipment company in Poughkeepsie. John and Mary Adriance's six children donated $100,000 from the fortune he made developing the buckeye plow to build the library, and purchase its books, in their parents' memory. It opened with a huge gala celebration on October 18, 1897.

By the early 1920s it was running out of space. A brick addition was built on the rear in 1923. It would serve for the remainder of the century.

=== 2007-2009 reconstruction ===
On September 30, 2007, the Adriance Memorial Library temporarily closed its main building in order to perform a major renovation project in order to more than double the space within the library. The 1923 addition was removed to make room for a new and larger addition at the back of the building, leaving the historic original structure intact in the front. The building was originally scheduled to reopen on October 1, 2009. In the interim, the main library was temporarily relocated to a former YWCA building on Bancroft Road.

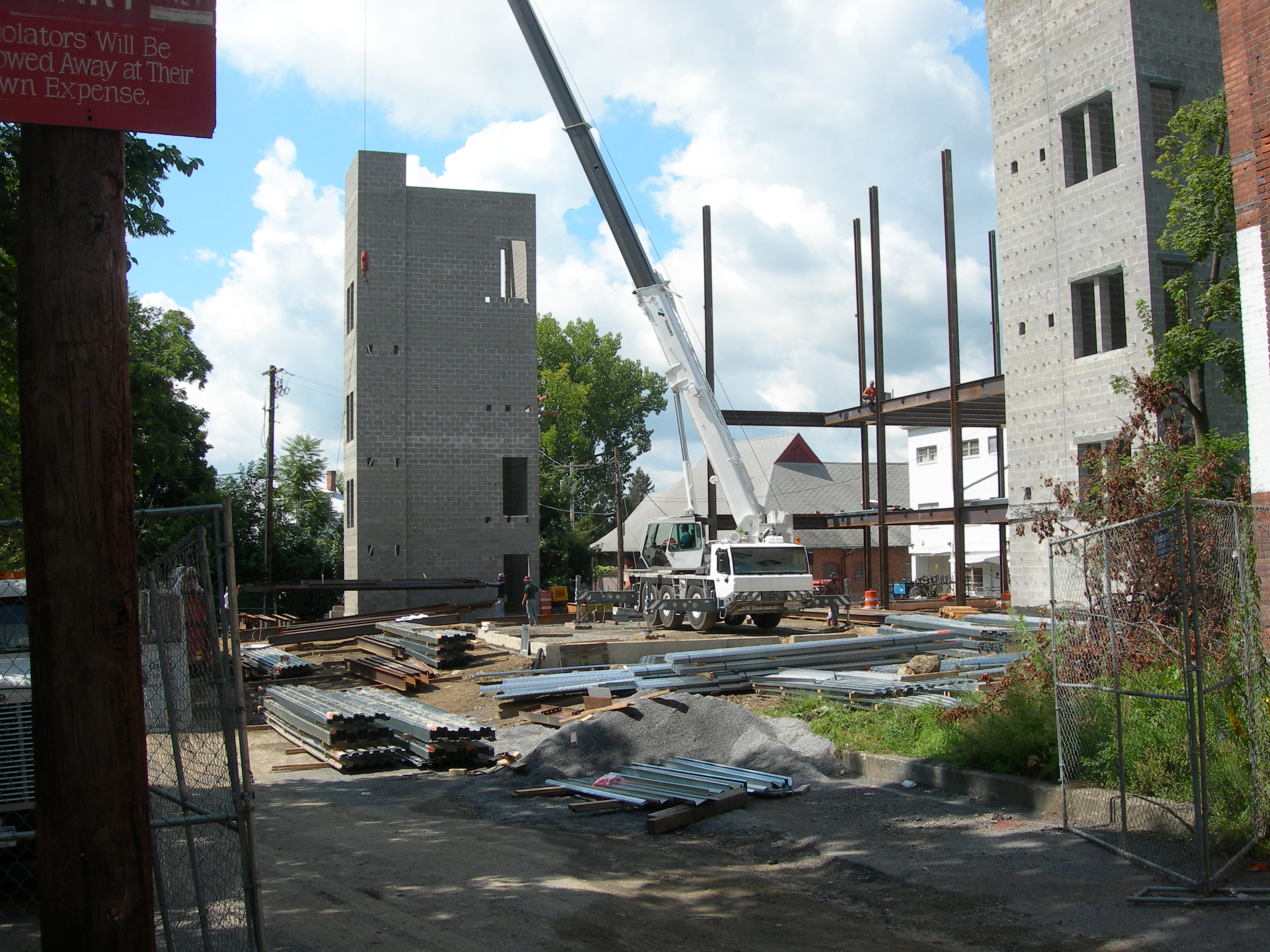
Construction in progress in 2008

On October 18, 2009, the 112th anniversary of the original opening, the library celebrated its Grand Re-Opening.

As of April 2012, the Adriance Memorial Library has been featured as a special building for the Hudson Valley civilization in a mod-pack in the popular strategy game Civilization IV: Beyond the Sword.

== See also ==
- National Register of Historic Places listings in Poughkeepsie, New York
