= Amrita Club =

- U.S. National Register of Historic Places
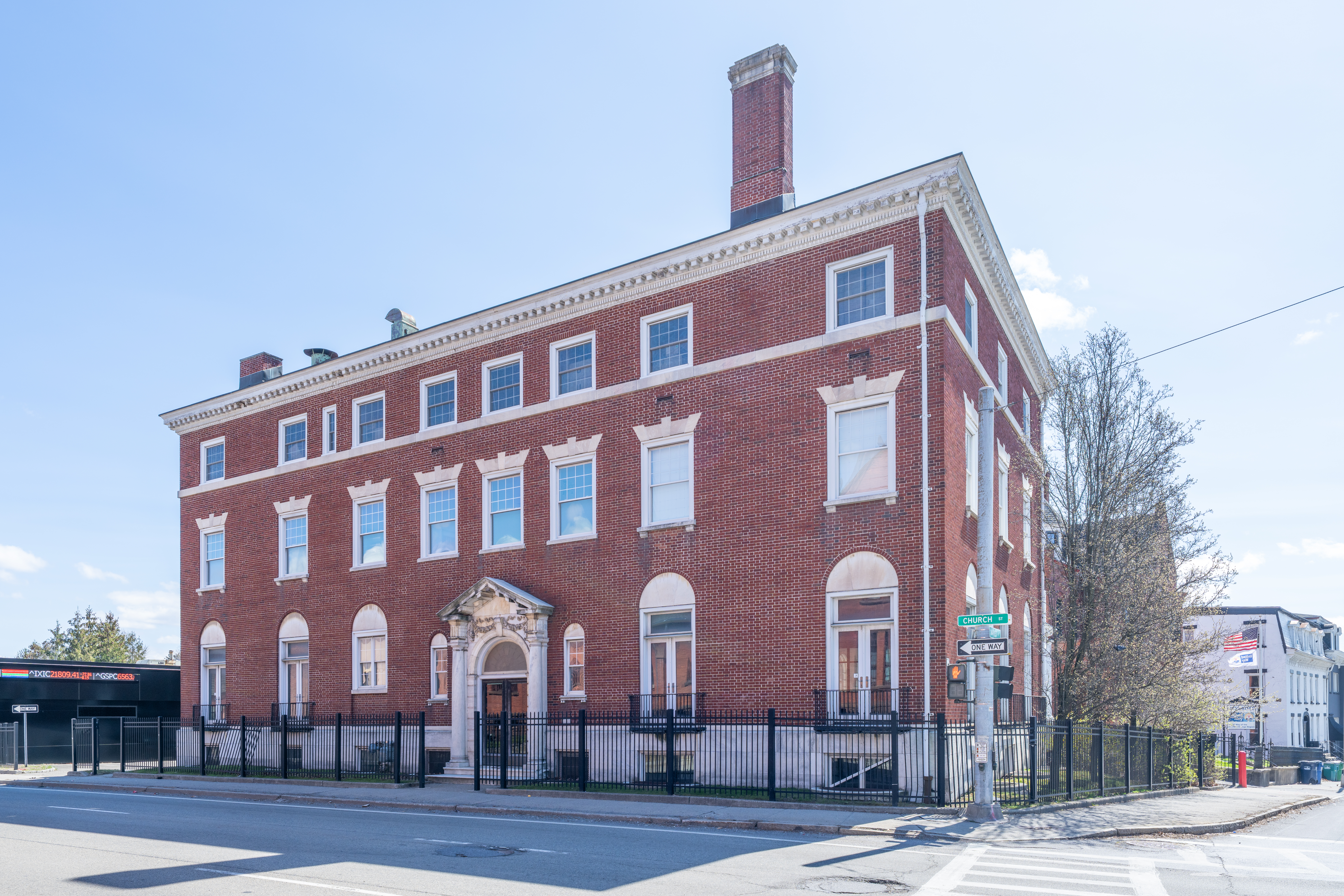
- North (front) elevation and west profile (2026)

- Location within New York Location within the United States
- Interactive map showing the location of Amrita Club
- Location: Poughkeepsie, NY
- Coordinates: 41°42′06″N 73°55′46″W
- Built: 1912
- Architect: Alfred E. Barlow
- Architectural style: Colonial Revival
- MPS: Poughkeepsie MRA
- NRHP reference No.: 82001119
- Added to NRHP: November 26, 1982

The Amrita Club building is located at the southeast corner of Church (US 44/NY 55) and Market streets in Poughkeepsie, New York, United States. It was once home to the club, one of the city's most prestigious gentlemen's organizations. In 1982 it was added to the National Register of Historic Places (NRHP).

The club was established in the late 19th century, but the building was not erected until the early 20th. It is one of only two brick Colonial Revival buildings in the city, and a sophisticated application of that style. Efforts to redevelop it in the early 21st century led to a protracted legal threats and negotiated settlement between the city and DTI (Decision Technologies International), a local software company which utilized the building as its corporate headquarters and development laboratory.

== Building ==
The Amrita Club is in a very historic neighborhood. It is across the street from the Market Street Row, a group of houses that includes Poughkeepsie's oldest frame house, and immediately north of the Hasbrouck House, with the Adriance Memorial Library a few houses down. It is across Church from the armory and across on the opposite corner is the Old Poughkeepsie YMCA. All of these are also listed on the Register.

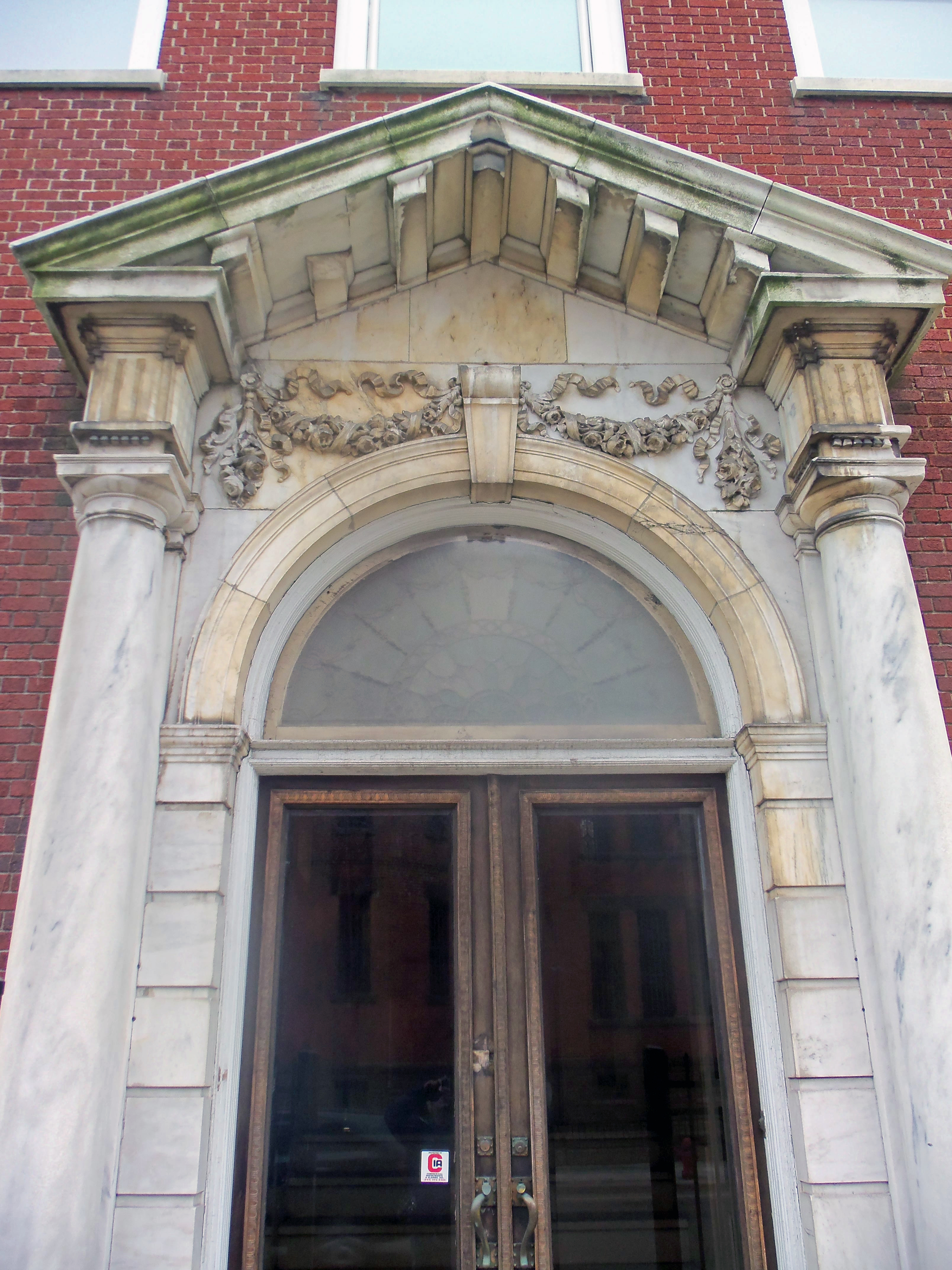
Front entrance

The building itself is a rectangular structure three stories tall, with raised basement, and eight to nine bays wide by three deep. Its double-doored, centrally located entrance has a marble surround consisting of columns with sculpted capitals and a dentilled entablature. Below that, the doors themselves are topped with a stained glass transom. The whole doorway is further topped with a keystone decorated with fleur-de-lis and ribbons on either side.

On either flank of the entrance, the first floor features French windows and iron balconies, except for the smaller windows next to the door, trimmed with marble lintels and sills. A similar pattern is found on the larger windows of the third story. Above them is a dentilled cornice and architrave; two large chimneys rise from the hipped roof. The rear elevation features two porches with Doric columns.

== History ==
The club was founded in 1873 for local businessmen and professionals, with future neighbor and prominent local lawyer Frank Hasbrouck as one of the charter members. It excluded Catholics, African-Americans and Jews, and soon became synonymous with the city's elite. In 1905, local historian Edmund Platt described as "the first club of any importance". "Much of Poughkeepsie's growth was decided at the Amrita Club's dinner table", writes Carolyn Burke in her biography of Lee Miller, whose father was a member during her childhood.

It met either in rented rooms or refurbished older buildings until it decided to build its own clubhouse in 1912. Designed by Alfred E. Barlow of New York, it cost the club $100,000 (equivalent to $3.34 million in 2025).

Over the course of the 20th century, the club's influence waned as the city grew more diverse and its industrial base declined. In the 1980s it eventually disbanded and the building became city property. Unoccupied, it decayed until 1999 when Decision Technologies International (DTI), a software consulting firm based in nearby Wappinger, reached a deal with the city to renovate the building and use it as its headquarters. The city committed $800,000 in urban-redevelopment grants to help the company.

In 2002, almost a year and a half after DTI had last withdrawn funds from the account, the city moved to foreclose on the property since it believed DTI was not serious about redeveloping it and it had been approached by others who were. DTI insisted it was serious, and after first threatening to contest any action vigorously, agreed to waive certain defenses in exchange for a 30-day reprieve. The city formally commenced foreclosure actions early in 2003, with DTI's founder, Idoni Matthews, promising a court fight. In October it began work again. DTI completed the renovation works in 2004, the city granted DTI a Certificate of Occupancy. The building currently home of DTI's corporate headquarter and software development laboratory.
