= Market Street Row =

Historic houses in New York, United States

- U.S. National Register of Historic Places
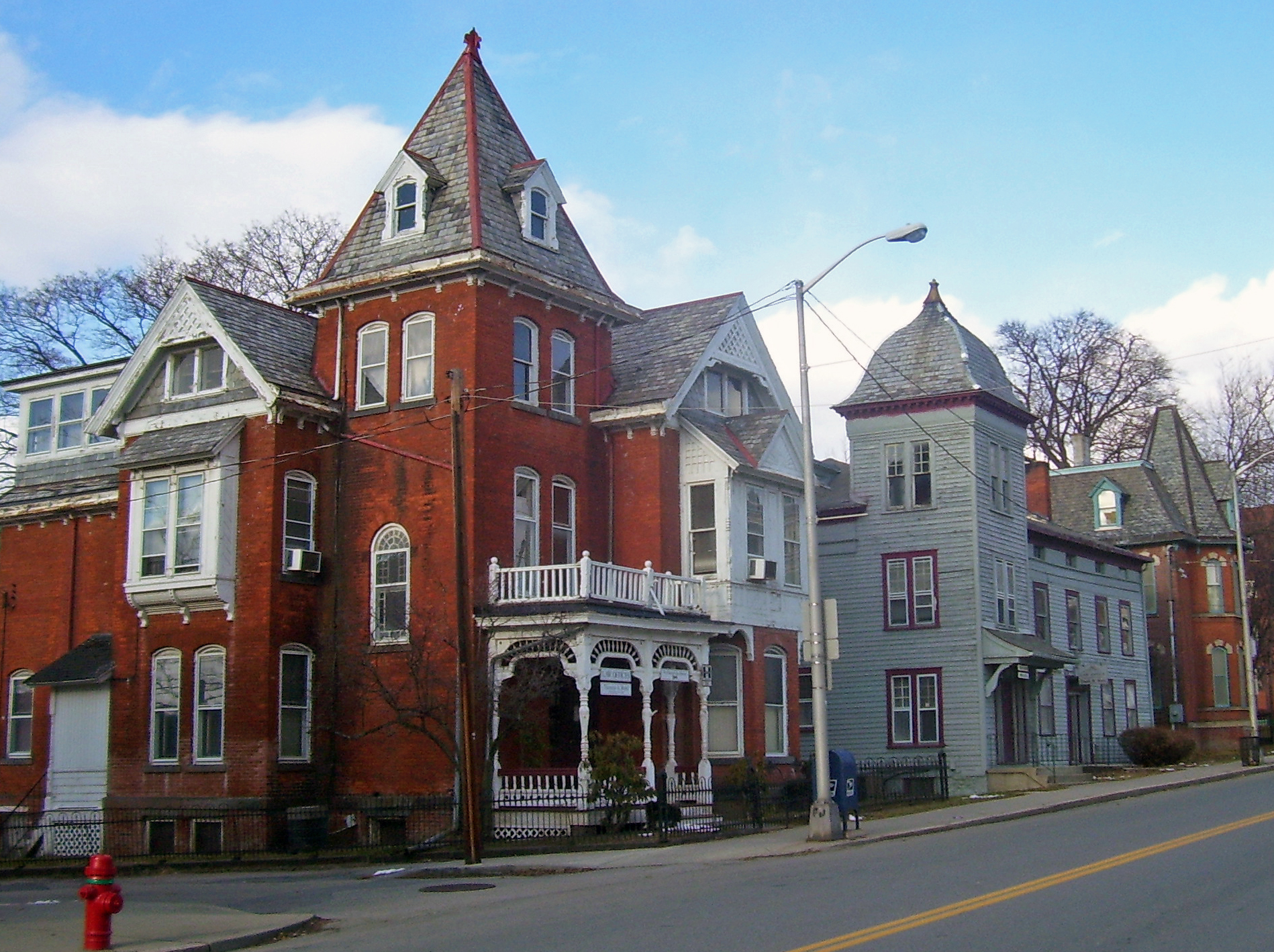
- Looking north along Market, 2008. Mott-Van Kleeck House is at center.
- Location: Poughkeepsie, NY
- Coordinates: 41°42′02″N 73°55′51″W
- Built: ca. 1780 (Mott-Van Kleeck House), 1880s
- Architectural style: Federal, mixed late Victorian
- MPS: Poughkeepsie MRA
- NRHP reference No.: 82001149
- Added to NRHP: 1982

The Market Street Row is located on the west side of that street in Poughkeepsie, New York, United States, just south of Hulme Park and across from the Adriance Memorial Library, on the southern edge of downtown. It includes three houses, including the Mott-Van Kleeck House, the oldest frame house in the city.

Market Street is Poughkeepsie's oldest, in existence in 1709 when a royal decree made it part of the King's Highway, later to become the Albany Post Road after independence. The Mott-Van Kleeck House was built around 1780 by a descendant of the Van Kleeck family, one of Poughkeepsie's oldest. Stylistically it is a precursor to the Federal style, in which later decorative motifs were added. For many years it indicated the beginning of Poughkeepsie to travelers.

In the late 19th century, around 1880, the two neighboring houses were built. They were ornate 2 1/2-story brick structures with peaked slate roofs, iron cresting, and Shingle-style porches. A tower was added to the Mott-Van Kleeck House, in sympathetic colors and materials.

In the automotive era, Market Street was incorporated into US 9, the main route for drivers from New York City to Albany until the construction of the New York State Thruway and the subsequent rerouting of Route 9 onto a new expressway through the city. The houses became decrepit and were threatened during urban renewal efforts in the 1970s. They were preserved instead, and added to the National Register of Historic Places in 1982. Today they have been redeveloped into commercial offices, like the Hasbrouck House and Amrita Club nearby.
