= Flushing Armory =

Armory in Queens, New York

- U.S. National Register of Historic Places
- New York State Register of Historic Places
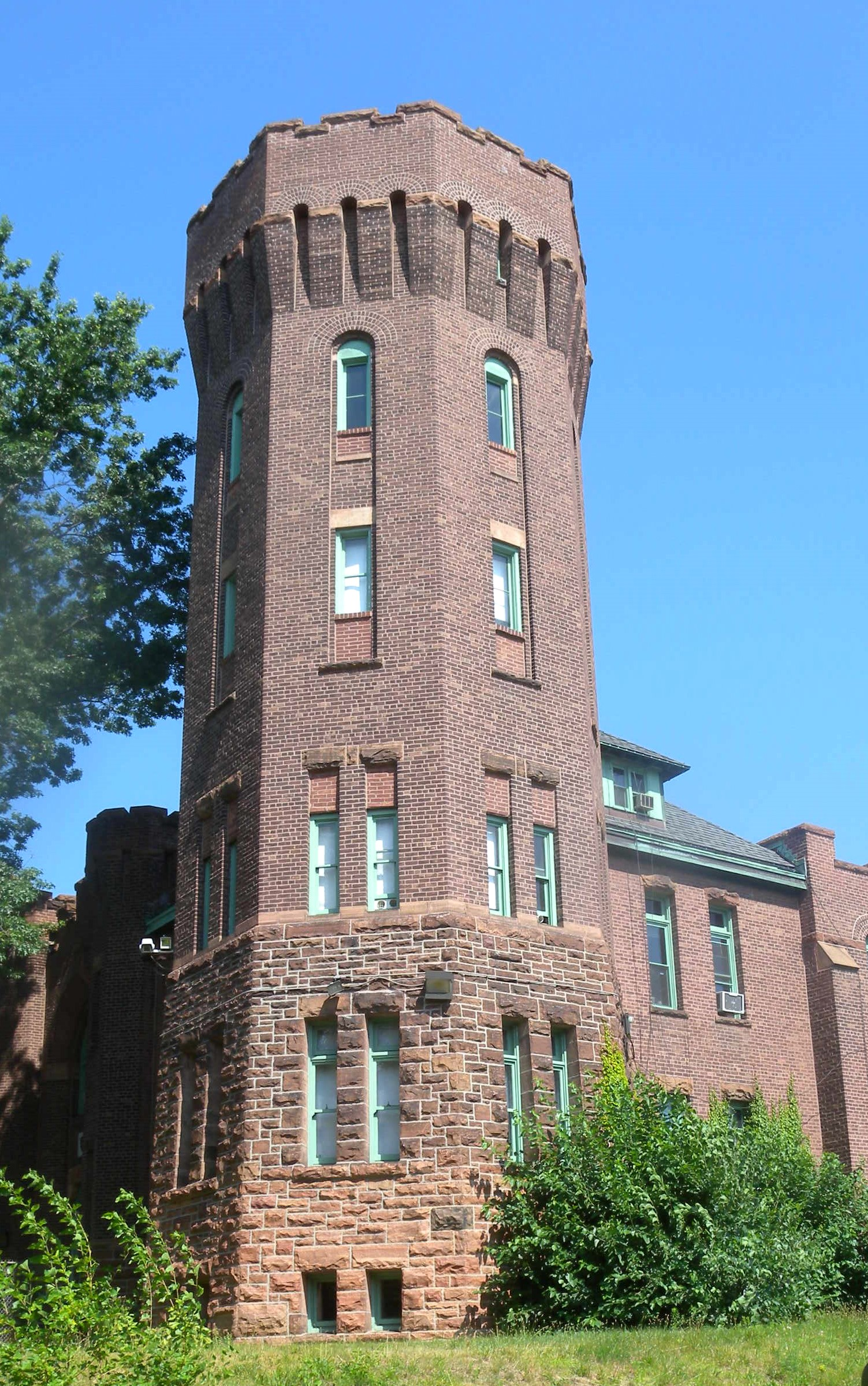
- Western octagonal tower

- Location within New York City Location within New York Location within the United States
- Location: 137-58 Northern Blvd., Flushing, New York
- Coordinates: 40°45′47″N 73°49′44″W
- Built: 1906
- Architect: Heins, George L.
- Architectural style: Late Victorian, Castellated
- MPS: Army National Guard Armories in New York State MPS
- NRHP reference No.: 95000270
- NYSRHP No.: 08101.006198

Significant dates
- Added to NRHP: March 23, 1995
- Designated NYSRHP: January 10, 1995

The Flushing Armory is a historic National Guard armory building located in Flushing, Queens. New York City. It is a brick and stone castle-like structure built in 1905–1906, designed to be reminiscent of medieval military structures in Europe. It was designed by state architect George L. Heins.

It consists of a two-story, hip-roofed administration building with an attached 1 1/2-story, gable-roofed drill shed, spanning open space of 11,400 square feet (1,060 m^{2}). Both sections are built of load bearing brick walls sitting on a brownstone foundation. The building features a five-story octagonal tower at the northwest corner and a three-story round tower at the northeast corner. They feature tall, narrow windows and crenellated parapets. Throughout the armory's history it has been used for the National Guard, as a homeless shelter, and a gymnastics center. It is currently used by the New York City Police Department's Strategic Response Group.

It was listed on the National Register of Historic Places in 1995.

== See also ==
- List of armories and arsenals in New York City and surrounding counties
- National Register of Historic Places listings in Queens, New York
