= Bedford Union Armory =

Armory in Brooklyn, New York

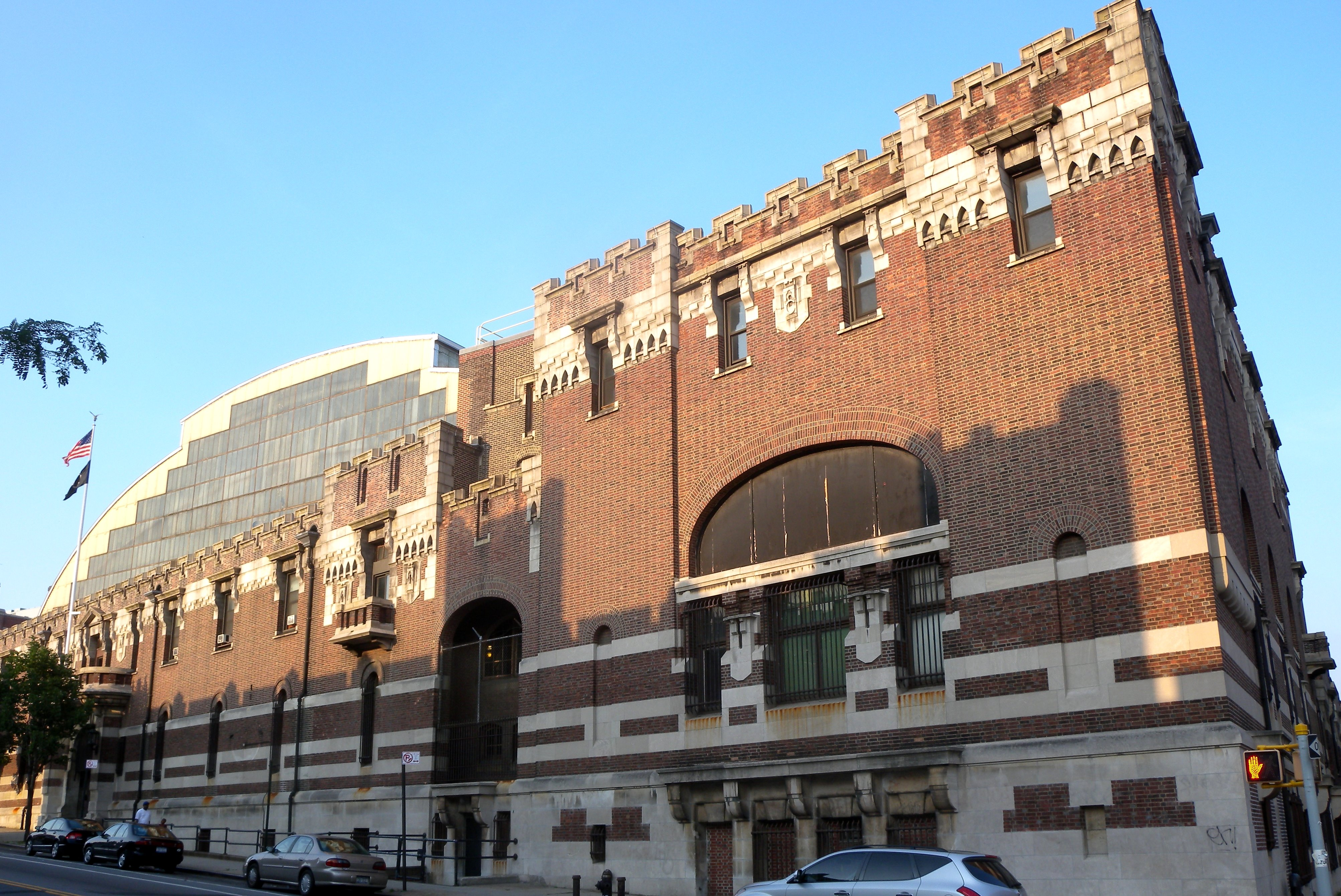
Bedford Union Armory seen from President Street.

The Bedford Union Armory, or the Troop C Armory (now officially known as the Major R. Owens Health and Wellness Community Center) is a historic National Guard armory building located in the Crown Heights neighborhood of Brooklyn, New York City. It is a brick and stone castle-like structure built in 1903 and opened in 1908 and was used by the U.S. Army for training, equipment storage and even as a horse stable. The current community center opened in October 2021.

== Proposed redevelopment ==
The Armory was proposed for redevelopment in 2015 as a 500,000-square-foot mixed-use development in a joint venture between the state EDC and several companies. The plan promises 350 housing units, half of them "affordable housing." There will also be a 45,000 square-foot multi-sport recreational facility, developed with the assistance of Carmelo Anthony and his foundation, office and commercial space, and a community space.

At the December 2015 announcement of the redevelopment, Walter Mosley said "We understand that we still have a long way to go. Understand that there are concerns that this community have brought to my attention and we need to ensure that we listen to them with a compassionate ear. Because ultimately, they're the ones who are going to have to deal with the ultimate outcome of this project."

By 2016 it was being redeveloped by BFC Partners via a lengthy public review process, despite community opposition. Cumbo said "Let's just continue to negotiate, see what the final outcome is, and if it's satisfactory," claiming adjustments could be made along the way. This followed many more months of push back from residents and activists. The new plan passed six months later and kept attracted protesters with Jonathan Westin of Communities for Change saying "The entire process was fixed from the beginning so the Mayor could push through a deal to one of his favored developers.... Plainly and simply: this is planned gentrification, driven by the gentrification mayor and rubber-stamped by Laurie Cumbo." In November 2017, Crown Heights tenants stood on the steps of City Hall and sued New York City and the NYCEDC in an effort to stall a controversial redevelopment plan on the armory.

In December 2019, groundbreaking begun on the armory and was halted in March 2020, groundbreaking resumed in June 2020. On February 26, 2021, Mayor Bill de Blasio, New York City Economic Development Corporation (NYCEDC), Brooklyn Borough President Eric Adams, City Council Majority Leader Laurie A. Cumbo, and BFC Partners announced the renaming of the Bedford Union Armory in Crown Heights for Major Robert Odell Owens (1936–2013) who represented Crown Heights in the U.S. House of Representatives from 1983 to 2007. The facility includes an indoor swimming pool, 3 hardwood basketball courts, an indoor soccer field, dance and performance studios, a fitness center and areas for boxing and archery, as well as 45,000 square feet (4,200 m^{2}) for local community-based nonprofits. An affordable housing lottery launched in June 2021, and the recreation center opened October 27, 2021.

== See also ==
- List of armories and arsenals in New York City and surrounding counties
