= Hasbrouck House (Poughkeepsie, New York) =

Historic house in New York, United States

- U.S. National Register of Historic Places
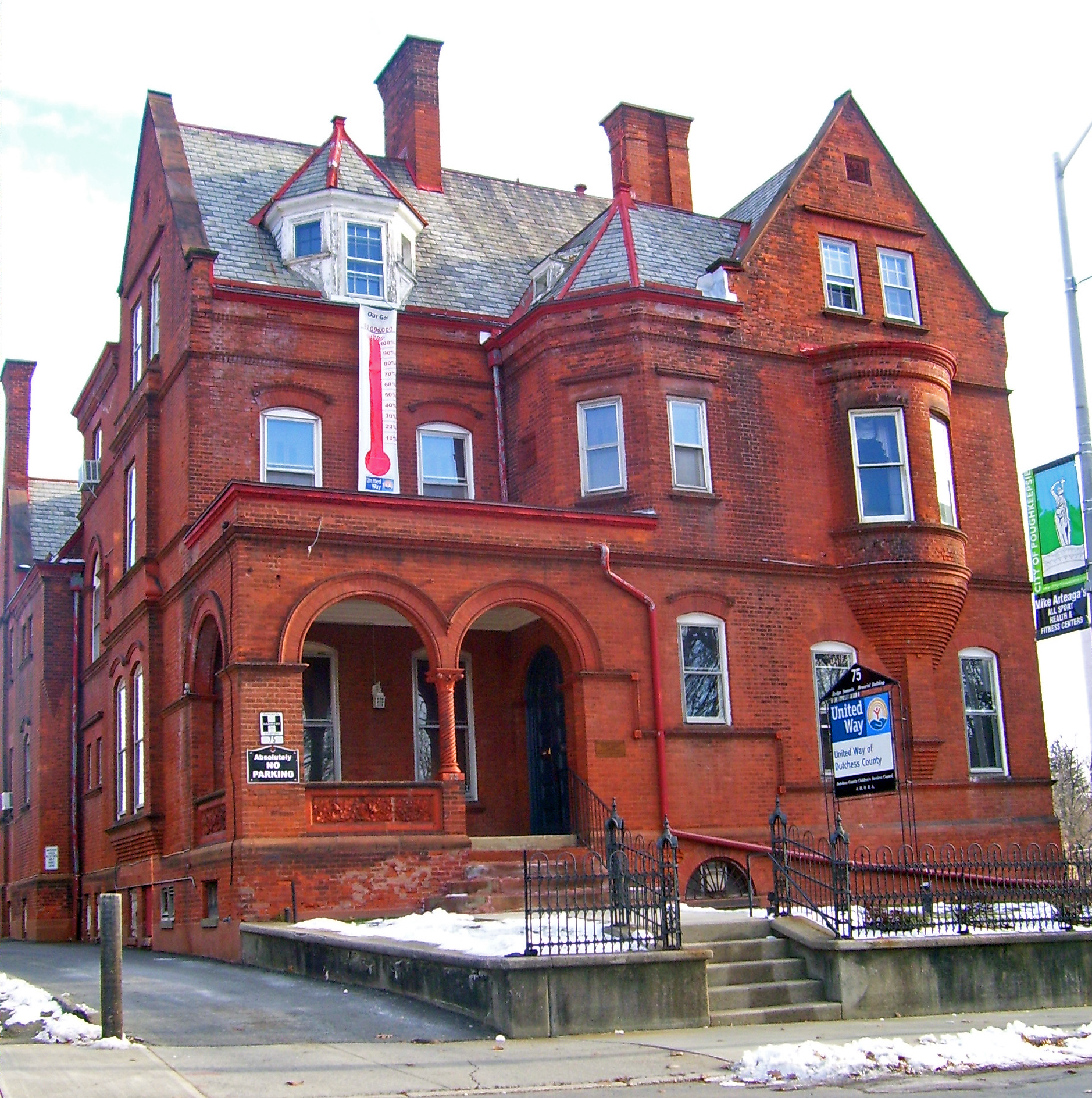
- Front of house in 2008, with United Way decor
- Location: Poughkeepsie, NY
- Coordinates: 41.7015°N 73.9298°W
- Built: 1885
- Architect: Frederick Clarke Withers
- Architectural style: Romanesque Revival
- MPS: Poughkeepsie MRA
- NRHP reference No.: 82001143
- Added to NRHP: November 26, 1982

The Hasbrouck House, also known as the Evelyn Samuels Memorial Building, is located on Market Street in downtown Poughkeepsie, New York, United States, next to the Amrita Club building. It was built in 1885 as the home of Frank Hasbrouck, a local judge and historian. The architect was Frederick Clarke Withers.

Withers' design, a red brick house of two and a half storeys and raised basement, features many Romanesque Revival touches, such as a recessed front porch with two round-headed arches divided by a spiral column with molded floral design and Corinthian capital. Below the railing are two fielded panels with foliate relief. On the upper stories, there are brownstone windowsills and courses around the house. Other ornaments include an oriel window on the second story, pentagonal dormer on the third, and a parapet roofline.

The interior remains intact. The fireplace, brick chimney, glazed tiles and oak woodwork are especially well-preserved examples of late 19th-century decor.

The house is the city's most distinguished building in the Romanesque style, complemented nearby by the similar New York State Armory and Harlow Row. It is unusual to find a Romanesque dwelling of this scale in a city Poughkeepsie's size. Normally they were reserved for larger cities, or prison compounds and military bases.

In the later years of the 20th century the house became the home of the United Way of the Dutchess-Orange Region which named it after Samuels, a former benefactor. It was added to the National Register of Historic Places in 1982.
