= List of armories and arsenals in New York City and surrounding counties =

This is a comprehensive list of armories and arsenals in New York City and surrounding counties of New York (i.e., in the New York metropolitan and downstate New York areas).

This list details the structures built between the 18th and 20th century. Many armories were constructed during this period; a few have since disappeared over time, while others have been converted to different uses. Through the decades these structures have been referred to under various names, and this catalog attempts to capture their identity. The list is arranged as follows:

The first unit; street (of reference); region or neighborhood (if referred to as such); year built; address; and name of neighborhood where available.

== New York City ==
=== Bronx (New York County^{1} and Bronx County) ===
- (2nd) Second Battery / Bathgate Avenue / Tremont Armory (year unknown – built prior to 1902)^{2} – 1887 / 1891 Bathgate Avenue (between East Tremont Avenue (East 177th Street) and East 176th Street), Tremont
- St. John's College / Fordham College / Fordham University / Rose Hill / Armory Hall (year unknown – built prior to 1906)^{3;} ^{4} – Rose Hill Campus Administration Building, 441 East Fordham Road, Fordham Manor
- (2nd) Second Battery / Franklin Avenue / Morrisania Armory (1906–1911; 1926–1928 expansion) – 1122 Franklin Avenue (at East 166th Street), Morrisania
- (8th) Eighth Regiment ((8th) Eighth Coastal Artillery) / Kingsbridge Road / Kingsbridge Armory (1913; 1912–1917) – 29 Kingsbridge Road (between Jerome Avenue and Reservoir Avenue); (1950's and 60's annex) – 10 West 195th Street (between Jerome Avenue and Reservoir Avenue), Jerome Park

Notes:
1. The armories in Bronx were built prior to the borough becoming a separate county in 1914. Before then, it was still part of New York County, which the western section of the present day borough joined in 1874 and the eastern section in 1895. It was previously part of Westchester County (1683).
2. The Tremont Armory at Bathgate Avenue, was a temporary facility used by the (2nd) Second Battery in 1902 until the unit moved to the new Franklin Ave Armory in 1910.
3. The Rose Hill Armory Hall is a later period annexed building to the (New) Rose Hill Manor / Mansion which was built in 1838 and is currently known as the Fordham University Rose Hill Campus Administration Building.
4. Armory Hall at Fordham University does not have a unit detail nor formal street crossing. Therefore, it is recognized by the names of the school representing the site and the campus.

=== Brooklyn (Kings County) ===
- (47th) Forty-seventh Regiment / Marcy Avenue / Williamsburg Armory (1883–1884) – 355 Marcy Avenue (between Heyward Street and Lynch Street), Williamsburg
- (23rd) Twenty-third Regiment / Clermont Avenue / Clinton Hill Armory (1872–1873; 1911 expansion) – 165-179 Clermont Avenue (between Myrtle Avenue and Willoughby Avenue), Clinton Hill
- (3rd) Third (Gatling) Battery / Dean Street-Crown Heights Armory (1885–1886) – 793-801 Dean Street (between Washington Avenue and Grand Avenue), Crown Heights
- (23rd) Twenty-third Regiment / Bedford Avenue-Crown Heights Armory (1891–1895) – 1322 Bedford Avenue (between Atlantic Avenue and Pacific Street), Crown Heights
- (14th) Fourteenth Regiment / (8th) Eighth Avenue / Park Slope Armory (1891–1895) – 1402 8th Avenue (between 14th Street and 15th Street), Park Slope
- (13th) Thirteenth Regiment / Sumner Avenue (Marcus Garvey Boulevard) / Bedford-Stuyvesant Armory (1892–1894) – 357 Marcus Garvey Boulevard (between Putnam Avenue and Jefferson Avenue), Bedford-Stuyvesant
- Troop C / Bedford Avenue Armory (1903–07) – 1579 Bedford Avenue (between Union Street and President Street), Crown Heights
- (2nd) Second Avenue / Sunset Park / Brooklyn Arsenal (1925; 1924–26)^{2} – 201 / 207 64th Street (between 2nd Avenue and 3rd Avenue), Sunset Park / Brooklyn Army Terminal

Defunct (no longer exist):

- Brooklyn City Guard / Adams Street / Gothic Hall Armory (1830s) – Gothic Alley^{1} and Adams Street, Downtown Brooklyn
- (13th) Thirteenth Regiment / Henry Street Armory (1858) – Henry Street (at Cranberry Street), Brooklyn Heights
- (2nd) Second Division / North Portland Avenue / State Arsenal (1858)^{2} – North Portland Avenue (N Portland Avenue) and Auburn Place; (1877–1878 Expansion for (14th) Fourteenth Regiment – renamed to Armory), Fort Greene
- (23rd) Twenty-third Regiment / Fulton Street / Orange Street Armory (1863) – Orange Street and Fulton Street (present day Old Fulton Street / Cadman Plaza West), Downtown Brooklyn / Brooklyn Heights
- (47th) Forty-seventh Regiment / Fourth and North Second Streets Armory (1864) – Fourth Street (present day Bedford Avenue) and North Second Street (N 2nd St; present day Metropolitan Avenue), North Williamsburg
- (32nd) Thirty-second Battalion & Regiment / Stagg Street Armory (1868) – Stagg Street and Bushwick Boulevard, East Williamsburg
- (13th) Thirteenth Regiment / Flatbush Avenue Armory (1874–1875) – Flatbush Avenue (at Hanson Place), Fort Greene
- (2nd) Second Battalion Naval Militia / First Avenue Armory (1902–1903) – 1st Avenue (between 51st Street and 52nd Street), Sunset Park / Bush Terminal
- Johnson Street Armory (year unknown) – Johnson Street, Downtown Brooklyn

Notes:
1. Gothic Alley no longer exists in the current New York City grid. It once ran between Adams Street and Pearl Street, south of Nassau Street. Its western section ended near the BRT Fulton Street Line (elevated) (present day Old Fulton Street / Cadman Plaza). Several buildings now occupy the street. Both Pearl Street and Nassau Street sections of this area were also decreased and no longer run through there.
2. The (2nd) Second Avenue / Sunset Park / Brooklyn Arsenal (1925; 1924–1926) building replaced the (2nd) Second Division / North Portland Avenue / State Arsenal (1858).

=== Manhattan (New York County) ===
- (7th) Seventh Regiment / Fifth Avenue / Central Park Arsenal (1848)^{1} – (830) Fifth Avenue (at East 64th Street), Central Park
- (7th) Seventh Regiment / Park Avenue / Lenox Hill Armory (1877–1879; 1909–1914 renovations) – 643 Park Avenue (between 66th Street and 67th Street), Lenox Hill
- Squadron A / Madison Avenue / Carnegie Hill Armory (1894–1895)^{2} – 1339 / 1345 Madison Avenue (between East 94th Street and East 95th Street), Carnegie Hill
- (1st) First Battery / West 66th Street / Lincoln Square Armory (1901–1903)^{3} – 56 West 66th Street (between Columbus Avenue and Central Park West (Eighth Avenue) – present day Lincoln Square neighborhood
- (69th) Sixty-ninth Regiment / Lexington Avenue / Flatiron District Armory (1904–1906) – 68 Lexington Avenue (between East 25th and East 26th streets), Flatiron District
- (22nd) Twenty-second Corps of Engineers / Fort Washington Avenue / Washington Heights Armory (1911) – 216 Fort Washington Avenue (168th Street and Fort Washington Avenue), Washington Heights
- (369th) Three Hundred and Sixty-ninth Regiment / Fifth Avenue / Harlem Armory (1924; 1930–1933 expansion) – 2366 Fifth Avenue (between West 142nd Street and West 143rd Street), Laurel Hill / North Harlem

Defunct (no longer exist):

- Fifth Avenue Arsenal (ca. 1808)^{1} – (830) Fifth Avenue (at East 64th Street), Central Park
- State Arsenal (ca. 1808)^{3} – Between White Street, Franklin Street, Elm Place (today Lafayette Street), and Center Street, Tribeca
- (7th) Seventh Regiment / Centre Market Armory (1830s) – Grand Street and Centre Street, present day Little Italy / Chinatown neighborhood
- (1st) First Division / Downtown Arsenal (1844)^{4} – Between White Street, Franklin Street, Elm Place (today Lafayette Street), and Center Street, Tribeca
- (7th) Seventh Regiment / Third Avenue / Tompkins Market Armory (1857–60) – Third Avenue (between East 6th and East 7th streets), East Village
- (1st) First Division / State Arsenal (1858) – Seventh Avenue (at West 35th Street), Garment District
- (22nd) Twenty-Second Regiment / 14th Street Armory (1863; 1872–1882 renovation)^{5} – 125 West 14th Street (between Sixth Avenue and Seventh Avenue), Chelsea
- (12th) Twelfth Regiment / Columbus Avenue Armory (1886–1887)^{6} – Columbus Avenue (between West 61st and West 62nd streets), present day Lincoln Square
- (8th) Eighth Regiment / Park Avenue Armory (1888–1889)^{2} – Park Avenue (between East 94th and East 95th streets), Carnegie Hill

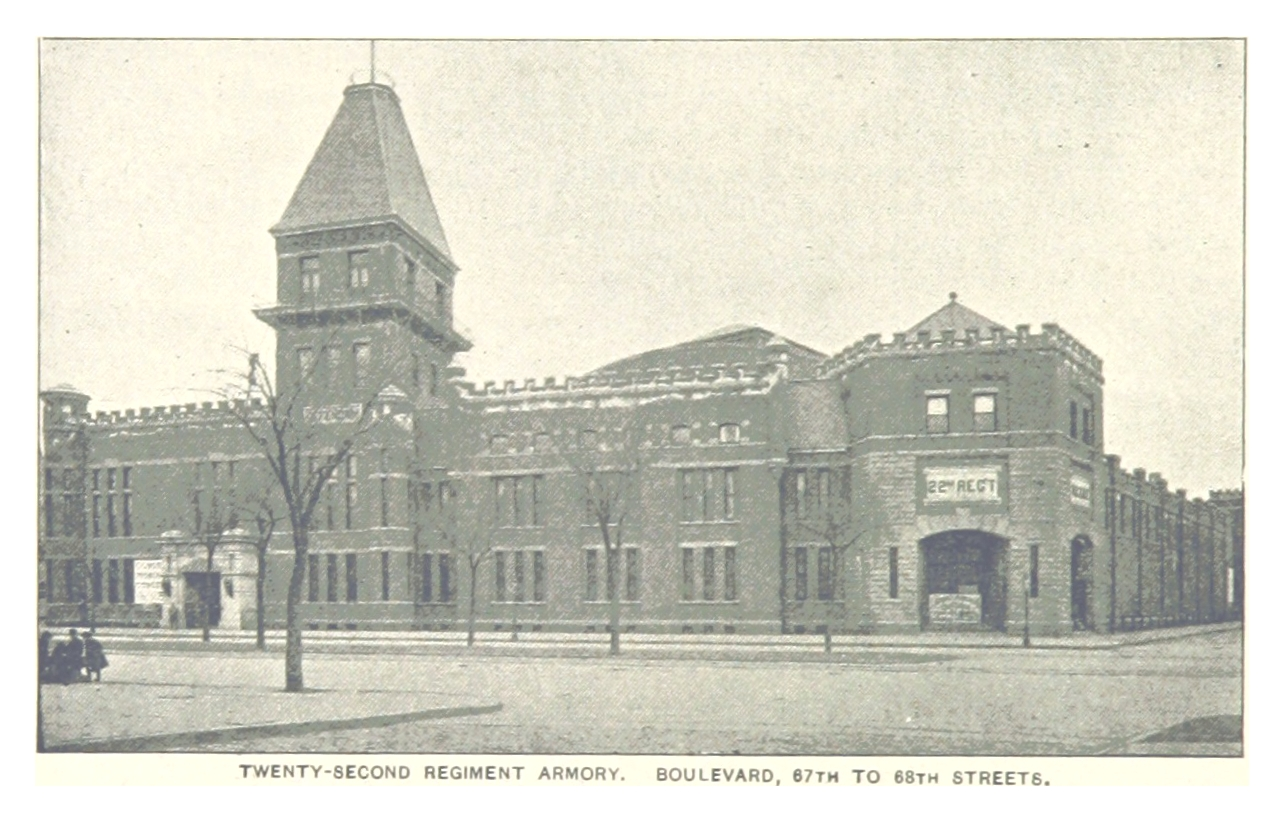
22d Regt Armory, 67th St

- (22nd) Twenty-Second Regiment / (1st) First Field Artillery / Broadway Armory (1889–1892) – 1988 Broadway (formerly Western Boulevard; between Broadway, Columbus Avenue, West 67th Street and West 68th Street), present day Lincoln Square
- (9th) Ninth Regiment / West 14th Street Armory (1894–1896)^{5} – 125 West 14th Street (between Sixth Avenue and Seventh Avenue), Chelsea
- (71st) Seventy-first Regiment / Park Avenue Armory (1894–1902)^{7} – Park Avenue (between East 33rd and East 34th streets), Midtown South
- (71st) Seventy-first New York Volunteers / Park Avenue Armory (1904–1906)^{7} – Park Avenue (between East 33rd and East 34th streets), Midtown South
- (42nd) Forty-Second Division / West 14th Street Armory (1971)^{5} – 125 West 14th Street (between Sixth Avenue and Seventh Avenue), Chelsea

Notes:
1. The Fifth Avenue Arsenal (ca. 1808) was replaced by the (7th) Seventh Regiment / Fifth Avenue / Central Park Arsenal (1848) on the same site.
2. The(8th) Eighth Regiment / Park Avenue Armory (1888–1889) was replaced by the Squadron A / Madison Avenue / Carnegie Hill Armory (1894–1895) on the same site.
3. The Lincoln Square Armory building is currently part of ABC Studios and is at times referred to as such.
4. The State Arsenal (ca. 1808) was eventually replaced by (1st) First Division / Downtown Arsenal (1844)) on the same site.
5. The (22nd) Twenty-Second Regiment / 14th Street Armory (1863) building was replaced with the (9th) Ninth Regiment / West 14th Street Armory (1894–1896) building, which was later replaced by (42nd) Forty-Second Division / West 14th Street Armory (1971) building, which in turn was replaced by a mix residential use structure, all on the same site.
6. The former site of the (12th) Twelfth Regiment / Columbus Avenue Armory (1886–1887) is now occupied by Fordham University's Lincoln Square campus where a memorial is dedicated by the 12th Regiment.
7. The (71st) Seventy-first Regiment / Park Avenue Armory (1894–1902) building was eventually replaced by (71st) Seventy-first New York Volunteers / Park Avenue Armory (1904–1906) on the same site.

=== Queens (Queens County) ===
- (10th) Tenth Infantry Regiment / Northern Boulevard / Flushing Armory (1904–1906) – 137-58 Northern Boulevard (between Main Street and Union Street), Flushing
- Naval Militia / 6th Avenue / Whitestone Armory (1913) – 150-74 6th Avenue (between Clintonville Street and Powells Cove Boulevard), Whitestone
- (104th) One Hundred and Fourth Field Artillery / 172nd Street-Jamaica Armory (year unknown – built before 1924)^{1} – 92-10 172nd Street (between Jamaica Avenue and 93rd Avenue), Jamaica
- (104th) One Hundred and Fourth Field Artillery / 168th Street-Jamaica Armory (1936) – 93-05 168th Street (between 93rd Avenue and Douglas Avenue), Jamaica

Defunct (no longer exists):

- Flushing Guards / (17th) Seventeenth Separate Company / Amity Street Armory (1884) – 170 Amity Street (now Roosevelt Avenue, near Main Street)^{2}, Flushing

Notes:
1. According to NYCityMap historical aerials the 172nd Street-Jamaica Armory building was present in 1924. Still, the (104th) One Hundred and Fourth Field Artillery used the building as a temporary facility between 1929–1936 until the new 168th Street-Jamaica Armory was completed.
2. When the IRT Flushing Line was extended along Roosevelt Avenue into Flushing, Amity Street was absorbed and the name Roosevelt Avenue was placed to follow the train line.

=== Staten Island (Richmond County) ===
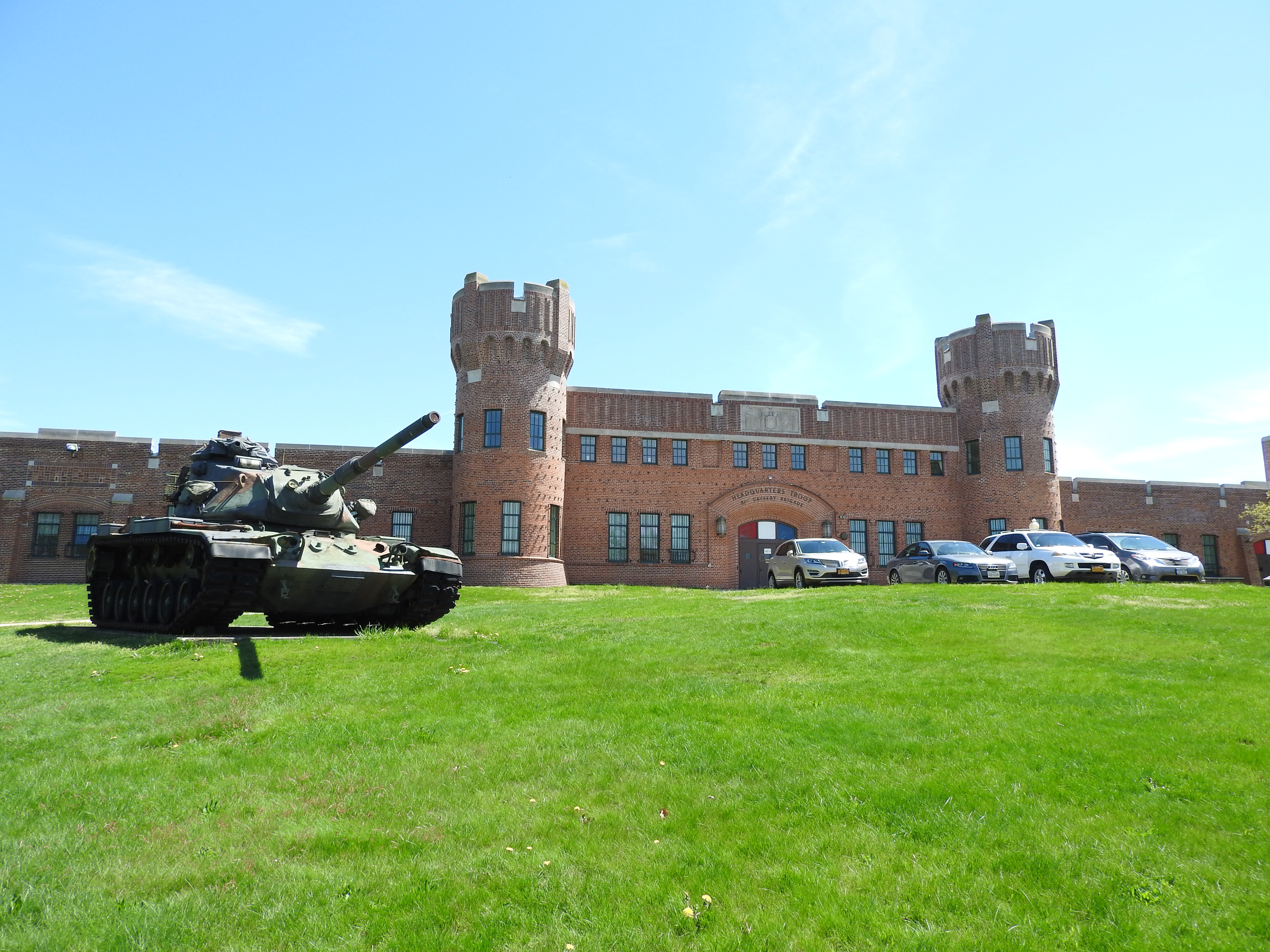
Staten Island Armory

- (101st) One Hundred and First Cavalry Squadron / Castleton Corners / Staten Island Armory (1922) – 321 Manor Road (at Merriman Avenue), Castleton Corners

== Westchester County ==
Mount Vernon

- (27th) Twenty-seventh Infantry Regiment / Mount Vernon Armory (1888-–1889) – 144 North Fifth Avenue (at North Street), Downtown Mount Vernon

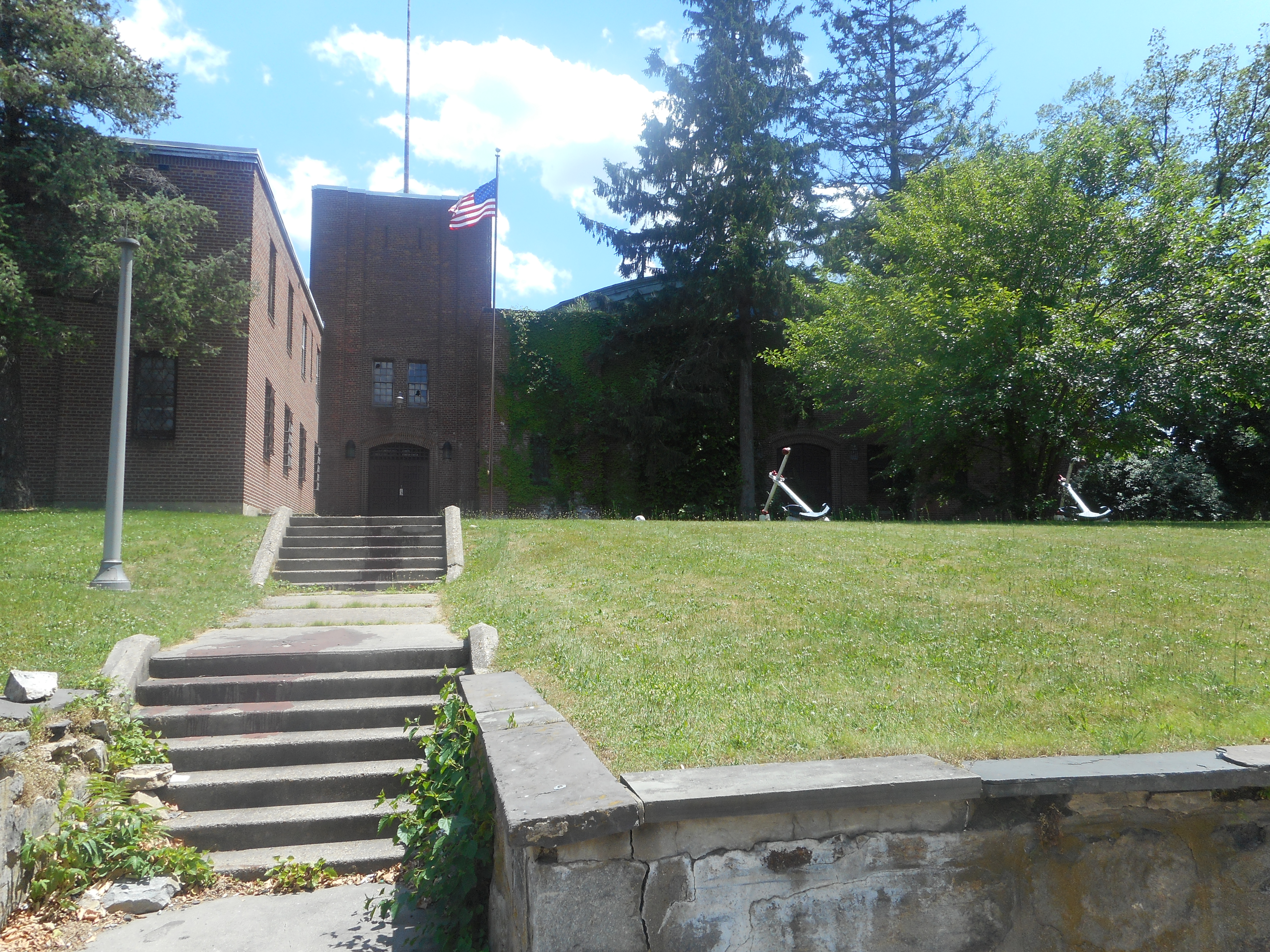
The former New Rochelle Armory on US 1 in New Rochelle

New Rochelle

- (31st) Thirty First Fleet Division of New York / New Rochelle Armory (1932–1933) – 270 Main Street (between Rhodes Street and Pratt Street; adjacent to Faneuil Park), Homestead Park

Ossining

- (101st) One Hundred and First Signal / Ossining Armory (1961) – 101 Route 9A / Albany Post Road (at Broadway)

Peekskill

- (156th) One Hundred and Fifty-six Field Artillery Regiment / Peekskill Armory (1932–1933) – 955 Washington Street (between Lindbergh Avenue and Lounsbury Lane)

Valhalla

- (42nd) Forty-second Military Police / Valhalla Armory (1986) – 2 Dana Road (at Sunshine Cottage Road)

White Plains

- (49th) Forty-ninth Separate Company / White Plains Armory (1909–10) – 35 South Broadway (at Mitchell Place); 65 Mitchell Place

Yonkers

- (4th) Fourth Separate Company / Waverly Street-Yonkers Armory (1890s) – 92 Waverly Street (at Maple Street), Getty Square / Downtown Yonkers
- (10th) Tenth Infantry Regiment / North Broadway-Yonkers Armory (1918) – 127 North Broadway (at Quincy Place), Getty Square / Downtown Yonkers
- (101st) One Hundred and First Signal Battalion / Quincy Place-Yonkers Armory (1988) – 2 Quincy Place (at N Broadway), Getty Square / Downtown Yonkers 40.9386°N 73.8974°W

== Rockland County ==
Orangeburg

- (101st) One Hundred and First Signal / Orangeburg Armory (1961) – 84 Old Orangeburg Road (between 1st Avenue and Edgewood Drive)

Monsey (formerly Viola)

- (17th) Seventeenth Infantry Regiment / Viola Armory (1863) – 198 Viola Road

== Dutchess County ==
Poughkeepsie

- (19th) Nineteenth Separate Company / Market Street-Poughkeepsie Armory (1891–1892) – 61 Market Street (at Church Street / East-West Arterial)

Defunct (no longer exists):

- (21st) Twenty-first Infantry Regiment / Main Street-Poughkeepsie Armory (at the Kirchner Building) (1872) – 278/282 Main Street

== Orange County ==
Middletown

- (24th) Twenty-fourth Separate Company / Middletown Armory (1891–1892) – 52 Highland Drive (at Wickham Avenue)

Newburgh

- (19th) Infantry Regiment / Broadway-Newburgh Armory (1879) – 145 Broadway (at South Johnson Street)
- (156th) On Hundred and Fifty-sixth Field Artillery Regiment / South William Street-Newburgh Armory (1931–1932) – 321 South William Street (between Walsh Road and South Robinson Avenue)

== Ulster County ==
Kingston

- (20th) Twentieth Infantry Battalion / Broadway-Kingston Armory (1879) – 467 Broadway (at Hoffman Street)
- (156th) On Hundred and Fifty-sixth Field Artillery Regiment / Kiersted Avenue-Kingston Armory (1932) – 25 Kiersted Avenue (formerly North Manor Road)

== Long Island ==
=== Nassau County ===
Freeport

- (142nd) One Hundred and Forty-second Artillery / Freeport Armory (1961) – 63 Babylon Turnpike (between Lakeview Avenue and Meadowbrook State Parkway)

Hempstead

- (102nd) One Hundred and Second Observation Squadron / Hempstead Armory (1927–1929) – 216 Washington Street (between Lent Avenue and Webb Avenue)

=== Suffolk County ===
Bay Shore

- (142nd) One Hundred and Forty-second Artillery / Bay Shore Armory (1955) – 70 Brentwood Road, (between Redington Street and Union Boulevard)

Huntington Station

- Battery C of 1st Missile Battalion / Huntington Station Armory (1958–1960) – 100 East 5th Street (by Park Avenue)

Nesconset

- (587th) Five Hundred and Eighty-seventh Transportation Squadron / Nesconset Armory (1961) – 148 Smithtown Boulevard (between Mayfair Road and Southern Boulevard)

Patchogue

- (142nd) One Hundred and Forty-second Artillery / Patchogue Armory (1961) – 100 Barton Avenue (between Mt Vernon Avenue and Tremont Avenue)

Riverhead

- (140th) One Hundred and Fortieth Transportation Squadron / Riverhead Armory (1957) – 1405 Old Country Road (between Osborn Avenue and Pulaski Street)

Ronkonkoma

- (142nd) One Hundred Forty-second Aviation / Ronkonkoma Armory (year unknown) – 201 Schafer Drive (by Clark Drive)

== Known rented facilities ==
Manhattan

- 1st Regiment – Sixth Avenue near Broadway (pre 1871)
- 5th Regiment – Hester Street (pre 1871)
- 6th Regiment – 14th Street (between Third Avenue and Lexington Avenue) (pre 1871)
- 8th Regiment – Upper floors of a commercial building at 226 West 23rd Street (between Seventh Avenue and Eighth Avenue) (1871–1878)
- 8th Regiment – Loft in the Old Broadway Stage stables at Ninth Avenue and West 27th Street (1880–1887)
- 8th Regiment – 281 Ninth Avenue (1883)
- 8th Regiment – Private house on Seventh Avenue (between West 34th Street and West 35th Street) (1879–1880)
- 8th & 69th Regiment – Broadway above Hester (pre 1871)
- 11th Regiment – Corner of Grand Street and Ludlow Street (1883)
- 11th Regiment – Delancey Street near Bowery Street (pre 1871)
- 12th Regiment – "Natural School" on 4th Street at Broadway (pre 1886)
- 12th Regiment – Broadway at 34th Street (pre 1886)
- 55th Regiment – Second Avenue (pre 1871)
- 69th Regiment – Essex Market (at the corner of Grand Street and Essex Street) (1871–sass's)
- 71st Regiment – Brick building on West 32nd Street near Sixth Avenue
- 71st Regiment – Commercial building on Broadway between West 35th Street and West 36th Street (1887–1889)
- 84th Regiment – Second Avenue (pre 1871)
- 96th Regiment – Bowery Street near East Houston (pre 1871)
- 1st Artillery – Sixth Avenue above 23rd Street (pre 1871)
- 1st Battery – 334–346 West 44th Street, above a saloon
- 1st & 3rd Cavalry – Bowery Street below Canal Street (pre 1871)
- Lindsey Blues (Independent Company) – 81 Broadway (1860s)
- Troop A – Dickel's Riding Academy – 136 East 56th Street (1890s)
- Washington Grey Troop - Broadway, by 34th Street and Sixth Avenue (pre 1871)

Brooklyn

- 47th Regiment – Fifth Street in Odeon building (1862–1864)

Queens

- 17th Separate Company – Housed temporarily in Peck and Fayerweather Store near Lawrence Street and Northern Boulevard

Yonkers

- 4th Separate Company – Post Lane near Main Street

Mount Vernon

- 27th Regiment – The 4th Avenue Hall

Ossining

- 101st Signal – St. John's Military Academy (1948–1958)
- 101st Signal – Camp Woods Road (firehouse located on upper floors) (1958–1961)

Peekskill

- 156th Field Artillery Regiment – Building on the corner of James Street and Park Street

Poughkeepsie

- Old carriage factory from (1865–1872)

Middletown

- 24th Separate Company – Unit was housed temporarily in a large local building known as the Casino (pre 1892)

== Existing and vanished armory and arsenal buildings ==
The following two tables illustrate the armory and arsenal structures that still exist, and the ones that have vanished.

=== Existing ===
Existing armory and arsenal buildings
	Name of armory	Image	Year built	Location	County	Description
1	(2nd) Second Battery / Bathgate Avenue / Tremont Armory		year unknown – built prior to 1902	Bronx; 1887 / 1891 Bathgate Avenue (between East Tremont Avenue (East 177th Street) and East 176th Street), Tremont 40.846486°N 73.897530°W	Bronx	
2	St. John's College / Fordham College / Fordham University / Rose Hill / Armory Hall		year unknown – built prior to 1906	Bronx; Rose Hill Campus Administration Building, 441 East Fordham Road, Fordham Manor 40.862088°N 73.886281°W	Bronx	
3	(2nd) Second Battery / Franklin Avenue / Morrisania Armory		1906–1911; 1926–1928 expansion	Bronx; 1122 Franklin Avenue (at East 166th Street), Morrisania 40.828177°N 73.905226°W	Bronx	
4	(8th) Eighth Regiment ((8th) Eighth Coastal Artillery) / Kingsbridge Road / Kingsbridge Armory		1913; 1912–1917; 1950s and '60s annex	Bronx; 29 Kingsbridge Road (between Jerome Avenue and Reservoir Avenue), Jerome Park 40.868416°N 73.898155°W	Bronx	
5	(47th) Forty-seventh Regiment / Marcy Avenue / Williamsburg Armory		1883–1884	Brooklyn; 355 Marcy Avenue (between Heyward Street and Lynch Street), Williamsburg 40.703486°N 73.952530°W	Kings	
6	(23rd) Twenty-third Regiment / Clermont Avenue / Clinton Hill Armory		1872–1873; 1911 expansion	Brooklyn; 165-179 Clermont Avenue (between Myrtle Avenue and Willoughby Avenue), Clinton Hill 40.692488°N 73.970384°W	Kings	
7	(3rd) Third (Gatling) Battery / Dean Street-Crown Heights Armory		1885–1886	Brooklyn; 793-801 Dean Street (between Washington Avenue and Grand Avenue), Crown Heights 40.679462°N 73.963340°W	Kings	
8	(23rd) Twenty-third Regiment / Bedford Avenue-Crown Heights Armory		1891–1895	Brooklyn; 1322 Bedford Avenue (between Atlantic Avenue and Pacific Street), Crown Heights 40.678339°N 73.953438°W	Kings	
9	(14th) Fourteenth Regiment / (8th) Eighth Avenue / Park Slope Armory		1891–1895	Brooklyn; 1402 8th Avenue (between 14th Street and 15th Street), Park Slope 40.662906°N 73.982941°W	Kings	
10	(13th) Thirteenth Regiment / Sumner Avenue (Marcus Garvey Boulevard) / Bedford-Stuyvesant Armory		1892–1894	Brooklyn; 357 Marcus Garvey Boulevard (between Putnam Avenue and Jefferson Avenue), Bedford-Stuyvesant 40.685053°N 73.937987°W	Kings	
11	Troop C / Bedford Avenue Armory		1903–1907	Brooklyn; 1579 Bedford Avenue (between Union Street and President Street), Crown Heights 40.668881°N 73.955374°W	Kings	
12	(2nd) Second Avenue / Sunset Park / Brooklyn Arsenal		1925; 1924–1926	Brooklyn; 201 / 207 64th Street (between 2nd Avenue and 3rd Avenue), Sunset Park / Brooklyn Army Terminal 40.641021°N 74.024051°W	Kings	
13	(7th) Seventh Regiment / Fifth Avenue / Central Park Arsenal		1848	Manhattan; (830) Fifth Avenue (at East 64th Street), Central Park 40.767608°N 73.971307°W	New York	
14	(7th) Seventh Regiment / Park Avenue / Lenox Hill Armory		1877–1879; 1909–1914 renovations	Manhattan; 643 Park Avenue (between 66th Street and 67th Street), Lenox Hill 40.767411°N 73.965922°W	New York	
15	Squadron A / Madison Avenue / Carnegie Hill Armory		1894–1895	Manhattan; 1339 / 1345 Madison Avenue (between East 94th Street and East 95th Street), Carnegie Hill 40.786124°N 73.954625°W	New York	
16	(1st) First Battery / West 66th Street / Lincoln Square Armory		1901–1903	Manhattan; 56 West 66th Street (between Columbus Avenue and Central Park West (Eighth Avenue) – present day Lincoln Square neighborhood) 40.773023°N 73.980793°W	New York	
17	(69th) Sixty-ninth Regiment / Lexington Avenue / Flatiron District Armory		1904–1906	Manhattan; 68 Lexington Avenue (between East 25th and East 26th streets), Flatiron District 40.741231°N 73.983919°W	New York	
18	(22nd) Twenty-second Corps of Engineers / Fort Washington Avenue / Washington Heights Armory		1911	Manhattan; 216 Fort Washington Avenue (168th Street and Fort Washington Avenue), Washington Heights 40.842105°N 73.941251°W	New York	
19	(369th) Three Hundred and Sixty-ninth Regiment / Fifth Avenue / Harlem Armory		1924; 1930–1933 expansion	Manhattan; 2366 Fifth Avenue (between West 142nd Street and West 143rd Street), Laurel Hill / North Harlem 40.817646°N 73.934687°W	New York	
20	(10th) Tenth Infantry Regiment / Northern Boulevard / Flushing Armory		1904–1906	Queens; 137-58 Northern Boulevard (between Main Street and Union Street), Flushing 40.763125°N 73.828958°W	Queens	
21	Naval Militia / 6th Avenue / Whitestone Armory		1913	Queens; 150–74 6th Avenue (between Clintonville Street and Powells Cove Boulevard), Whitestone 40.796707°N 73.814217°W	Queens	
22	(104th) One Hundred and Fourth Field Artillery / 172nd Street-Jamaica Armory		year unknown – built before 1924	Queens; 92-10 172nd Street (between Jamaica Avenue and 93rd Avenue), Jamaica 40.707008°N 73.788063°W	Queens	
23	(104th) One Hundred and Fourth Field Artillery / 168th Street-Jamaica Armory		1936	Queens; 93-05 168th Street (between 93rd Avenue and Douglas Avenue), Jamaica 40.704639°N 73.791074°W	Queens	
24	(101st) One Hundred and First Cavalry Squadron / Castleton Corners / Staten Island Armory		1922	Staten Island; 321 Manor Road (at Merriman Avenue), Castleton Corners 40.620383°N 74.122844°W	Richmond	
25	(27th) Twenty-seventh Infantry Regiment / Mount Vernon Armory		1888–1889	Mount Vernon; 144 North Fifth Avenue (at North Street), Downtown Mount Vernon 40.915881°N 73.838762°W	Westchester	
26	(31st) Thirty First Fleet Division of New York / New Rochelle Armory		1932–1933	New Rochelle; 270 Main Street (between Rhodes Street and Pratt Street; adjacent to Faneuil Park), Homestead Park 40.913488°N 73.772873°W	Westchester	
27	(101st) One Hundred and First Signal / Ossining Armory		1961	Ossining; 101 Route 9A / Albany Post Road (at Broadway) 41.163362°N 73.862399°W	Westchester	
28	(156th) One Hundred and Fifty-six Field Artillery Regiment / Peekskill Armory		1932–1933	Peekskill; 955 Washington Street (between Lindbergh Avenue and Lounsbury Lane) 41.272639°N 73.928859°W	Westchester	
29	(42nd) Forty-second Military Police / Valhalla Armory		1986	Valhalla; 2 Dana Road (at Sunshine Cottage Road) 41.082289°N 73.813332°W	Westchester	
30	(49th) Forty-ninth Separate Company / White Plains Armory		1909–10	White Plains; 35 South Broadway (at Mitchell Place); 65 Mitchell Place 41.031343°N 73.762471°W	Westchester	
31	(4th) Fourth Separate Company / Waverly Street-Yonkers Armory		1890s	Yonkers; 92 Waverly Street (at Maple Street), Getty Square / Downtown Yonkers 40.932742°N 73.893135°W	Westchester	
32	(10th) Tenth Infantry Regiment / North Broadway-Yonkers Armory		1918	Yonkers; 127 North Broadway (at Quincy Place), Getty Square / Downtown Yonkers 40.938857°N 73.896721°W	Westchester	
33	(101st) One Hundred and First Signal Battalion / Quincy Place-Yonkers Armory		1988	Yonkers; 2 Quincy Place (at N Broadway), Getty Square / Downtown Yonkers 40.938280°N 73.896998°W	Westchester	
34	(101st) One Hundred and First Signal / Orangeburg Armory		1961	Orangeburg; 84 Old Orangeburg Road (between 1st Avenue and Edgewood Drive) 41.045455°N 73.966122°W	Rockland	
35	(19th) Nineteenth Separate Company / Market Street-Poughkeepsie Armory		1891–1892	Poughkeepsie; 61 Market Street (at Church Street / East-West Arterial) 41.701999°N 73.929192°W	Dutchess	
36	(24th) Twenty-fourth Separate Company / Middletown Armory (1891–1892)		1891–1892	Middletown; 52 Highland Drive (at Wickham Avenue) 41.449013°N 74.421569°W	Orange	
37	(19th) Infantry Regiment / Broadway-Newburgh Armory (1879)		1879	Newburgh; 145 Broadway (at South Johnson Street) 41.499753°N 74.013389°W	Orange	
38	(156th) On Hundred and Fifty-sixth Field Artillery Regiment / South William Street-Newburgh Armory (1931–1932)		1931–1932	Newburgh; 321 South William Street (between Walsh Road and South Robinson Avenue 41.496204°N 74.025483°W	Orange	
39	(20th) Twentieth Infantry Battalion / Broadway-Kingston Armory (1879)		1879	Kingston; 467 Broadway (at Hoffman Street) 41.927116°N 73.998985°W	Ulster	
40	(156th) On Hundred and Fifty-sixth Field Artillery Regiment / Kiersted Avenue-Kingston Armory (1932)		1932	Kingston; 25 Kiersted Avenue (formerly North Manor Road) 41.944330°N 74.006921°W	Ulster	
41	(142nd) One Hundred and Forty-second Artillery / Freeport Armory		1961	Freeport; 63 Babylon Turnpike (between Lakeview Avenue and Meadowbrook State Parkway) 40.665186°N 73.571670°W	Nassau	
42	(102nd) One Hundred and Second Observation Squadron / Hempstead Armory		1927–1929	Hempstead; 216 Washington Street (between Lent Avenue and Webb Avenue) 40.713751°N 73.622421°W	Nassau	
43	(142nd) One Hundred and Forty-second Artillery / Bay Shore Armory		1955	Bay Shore; 70 Brentwood Road, (between Redington Street and Union Boulevard) 40.731439°N 73.236672°W	Suffolk	
44	Battery C of 1st Missile Battalion / Huntington Station Armory		1958–1960	Huntington Station; 100 East 5th Street (by Park Avenue) 40.857304°N 73.394655°W	Suffolk	
45	(587th) Five Hundred and Eighty-seventh Transportation Squadron / Nesconset Armory		1961	Nesconset; 148 Smithtown Boulevard (between Mayfair Road and Southern Boulevard) 40.836640°N 73.159114°W	Suffolk	
46	(142nd) One Hundred and Forty-second Artillery / Patchogue Armory		1961	Patchogue; 100 Barton Avenue (between Mt Vernon Avenue and Tremont Avenue) 40.786875°N 73.004141°W	Suffolk	
47	(140th) One Hundred and Fortieth Transportation Squadron / Riverhead Armory		1957	Riverhead; 1405 Old Country Road (between Osborn Avenue and Pulaski Street) 40.926566°N 72.687267°W	Suffolk	
48	(142nd) One Hundred Forty-second Aviation / Ronkonkoma Armory		year unknown	Ronkonkoma; 201 Schafer Drive (by Clark Drive) 40.787690°N 73.103371°W	Suffolk	

=== Vanished ===
Vanished armory and arsenal buildings
	Name of armory	Image	Year built	Location	County	Description
1	Brooklyn City Guard / Adams Street / Gothic Hall Armory		1830s	Brooklyn; Gothic Alley and Adams Street, Downtown Brooklyn	Kings	
2	(13th) Thirteenth Regiment / Henry Street Armory		1858	Brooklyn; Henry Street (at Cranberry Street), Brooklyn Heights	Kings	
3	(2nd) Second Division / North Portland Avenue / State Arsenal		1858	Brooklyn; North Portland Avenue (N Portland Avenue) and Auburn Place; (1877–1878 Expansion for (14th) Fourteenth Regiment – renamed to Armory), Fort Greene	Kings	
4	(23rd) Twenty-third Regiment / Fulton Street / Orange Street Armory		1863	Brooklyn; Orange Street and Fulton Street (present day Old Fulton Street / Cadman Plaza West), Downtown Brooklyn / Brooklyn Heights	Kings	
5	47th) Forty-seventh Regiment / Fourth and North Second Streets Armory		1864	Brooklyn; Fourth Street (present day Bedford Avenue) and North Second Street (N 2nd St; present day Metropolitan Avenue), North Williamsburg	Kings	
6	(32nd) Thirty-second Battalion & Regiment / Stagg Street Armory		1868	Brooklyn; Stagg Street and Bushwick Boulevard, East Williamsburg	Kings	
7	(13th) Thirteenth Regiment / Flatbush Avenue Armory		1874–1875	Brooklyn; Flatbush Avenue (at Hanson Place), Fort Greene	Kings	
8	(2nd) Second Battalion Naval Militia / First Avenue Armory		1902–1903	Brooklyn; 1st Avenue (between 51st Street and 52nd Street), Sunset Park / Bush Terminal 40.649853°N 74.020332°W	Kings	
9	Johnson Street Armory		year unknown	Brooklyn; Johnson Street, Downtown Brooklyn	Kings	
10	Fifth Avenue Arsenal		1808	Manhattan; (830) Fifth Avenue (at East 64th Street), Central Park 40.767608°N 73.971307°W	New York	
11	State Arsenal		1808	Manhattan; Between White Street, Franklin Street, Elm Place (today Lafayette Street), and Center Street, Tribeca 40.716853°N 74.001437°W	New York	
12	(7th) Seventh Regiment / Centre Market Armory		1830s	Manhattan; Grand Street and Centre Street, present day Little Italy / Chinatown neighborhood	New York	
13	(1st) First Division / Downtown Arsenal		1844	Manhattan; Between White Street, Franklin Street, Elm Place (today Lafayette Street), and Center Street, Tribeca 40.716853°N 74.001437°W	New York	
14	(7th) Seventh Regiment / Third Avenue / Tompkins Market Armory		1857–60	Manhattan; Third Avenue (between East 6th and East 7th streets), East Village	New York	
15	(1st) First Division / State Arsenal		1858	Manhattan; Seventh Avenue (at West 35th Street), Garment District	New York	
16	(22nd) Twenty-Second Regiment / 14th Street Armory		1863; 1872–1882 renovation	Manhattan; 125 West 14th Street (between Sixth Avenue and Seventh Avenue), Chelsea 40.738209°N 73.997689°W	New York	
17	(12th) Twelfth Regiment / Columbus Avenue Armory		1886–1887	Manhattan; Columbus Avenue (between West 61st and West 62nd streets), present day Lincoln Square 40.770968°N 73.984284°W	New York	
18	(8th) Eighth Regiment / Park Avenue Armory		1888–1889	Manhattan; Park Avenue (between East 94th and East 95th streets), Carnegie Hill 40.785960°N 73.954246°W	New York	
19	(22nd) Twenty-Second Regiment / (1st) First Field Artillery / Broadway Armory		1889–1892	Manhattan; 1988 Broadway (formerly Western Boulevard; between Broadway, Columbus Avenue, West 67th Street and West 68th Street), present day Lincoln Square 40.774800°N 73.981490°W	New York	
20	(9th) Ninth Regiment / West 14th Street Armory		1894–1896	Manhattan; 125 West 14th Street (between Sixth Avenue and Seventh Avenue), Chelsea 40.738209°N 73.997689°W	New York	
21	(71st) Seventy-first Regiment / Park Avenue Armory		1894–1902	Manhattan; Park Avenue (between East 33rd and East 34th streets), Midtown South 40.746528°N 73.981178°W	New York	
22	(71st) Seventy-first New York Volunteers / Park Avenue Armory		1904–1906	Manhattan; Park Avenue (between East 33rd and East 34th streets), Midtown South 40.746528°N 73.981178°W	New York	
23	(42nd) Forty-Second Division / West 14th Street Armory		1971	Manhattan; 125 West 14th Street (between Sixth Avenue and Seventh Avenue), Chelsea 40.738209°N 73.997689°W	New York	
24	Flushing Guards / (17th) Seventeenth Separate Company / Amity Street Armory		1884	Queens; 170 Amity Street (now Roosevelt Avenue, near Main Street), Flushing	Queens	
25	(17th) Seventeenth Infantry Regiment / Viola Armory		1863	Viola; address unknown	Rockland	
26	(21st) Twenty-first Infantry Regiment / Main Street-Poughkeepsie Armory (at the Kirchner Building)		1872	Poughkeepsie; 278/282 Main Street 41.703979°N 73.927761°W	Dutchess	

== See also ==
- List of National Historic Landmarks in New York
- List of National Historic Landmarks in New York City
- National Register of Historic Places listings in New York
- National Register of Historic Places listings in New York City (disambiguation)
- List of New York City Designated Landmarks
- List of New York State Historic Sites
- New York State Armory
- List of New York Civil War regiments
- Historic preservation in New York
- New York City Landmarks Preservation Commission
