= Frank Hasbrouck =

American judge

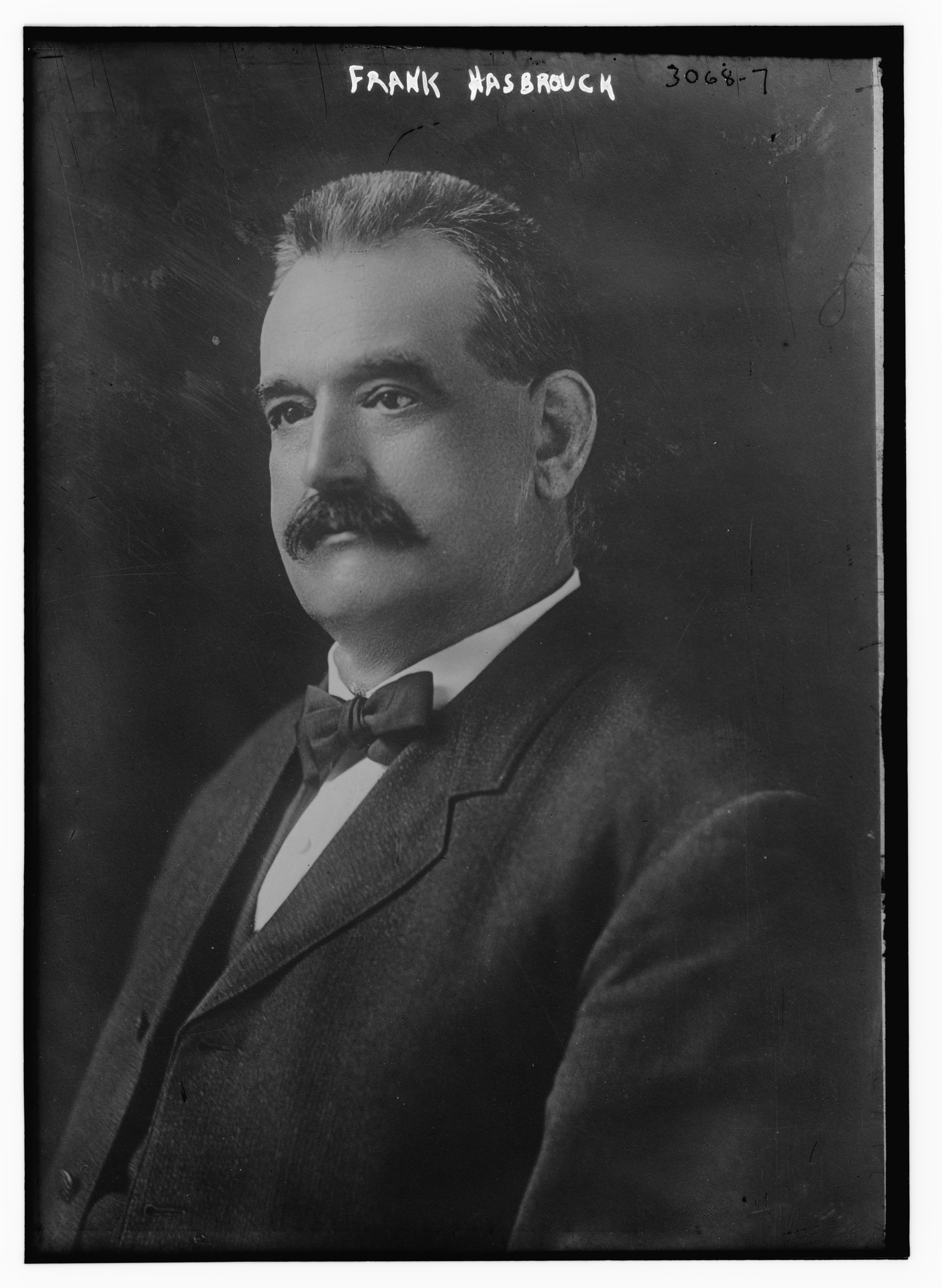
Frank Hasbrouck

Frank Hasbrouck (January 4, 1852 – December 18, 1928) was an American lawyer and judge from New York.

== Life ==
Hasbrouck was born on January 4, 1852, in Poughkeepsie, New York, the son of Dr. Alfred Hasbrouck and Margaret Ann Manning. He was descended from three of the twelve New Paltz Patentees: Abraham Hasbrouck, his brother Jean Hasbrouck, and Hugo Freer. He was also a descendant of Baltus Van Kleeck, an original settler of Poughkeepsie.

Hasbrouck attended the Dutchess County Academy. He went to Harvard College in 1868, graduating from there with a B.A. in 1872. He then studied law in the office of Orlando D. M. Baker of Poughkeepsie. He was admitted to the bar in 1875. He spent the next several years working as managing clerk in Baker's office, then set up his own practice in Poughkeepsie. He was an active member of the Democratic Party, and unsuccessfully ran for several local and county offices in a heavily Republican area. In 1875, he was elected to the city's board of health, serving two years as a member and secretary of the board. In 1876, he was elected Justice of the Peace of Poughkeepsie, serving in that position from 1877 to 1880. He was appointed city treasurer and served in the office from 1887 to 1888. President Cleveland appointed him Postmaster of Poughkeepsie, an office he held from 1895 to 1899. He was appointed corporation counsel of the city in 1907.

In 1907, Hasbrouck was elected County Judge of Dutchess County. He served in that office for a six-year term. In 1914, Governor Glynn appointed him Superintendent of the New York State Insurance Department. He served as Superintendent until 1915, after which he resumed his law practice.

Hasbrouck attended the Reformed Dutch Church. He was a founder and first secretary of the Amrita Club, trustee, vice-president, and president of the Holland Society, and a and manager of the Sons of the American Revolution. He was at one point a member of the University Club of New York, but later dropped all New York City club affiliations and became president of the local University Club. He contributed historical papers to local periodicals, and in 1909 he edited a history of Dutchess County. In 1876, he married Esther Jackman of Lock Haven, Pennsylvania. Their children were Ross (a notable Poughkeepsie engineer), Alfred (a Latin American history professor in Lake Forest College), Olga, and Elsa (an accomplished sculptor, interior decorator, and co-founder of the Windbrook School).

Hasbrouck died at home from apoplexy on December 18, 1926. He was buried in Poughkeepsie Rural Cemetery.

The Hasbrouck House, built for Hasbrouck by architect Frederick Clarke Withers in 1885, was added to the National Register of Historic Places in 1982.
