= Old Poughkeepsie YMCA =

- U.S. National Register of Historic Places
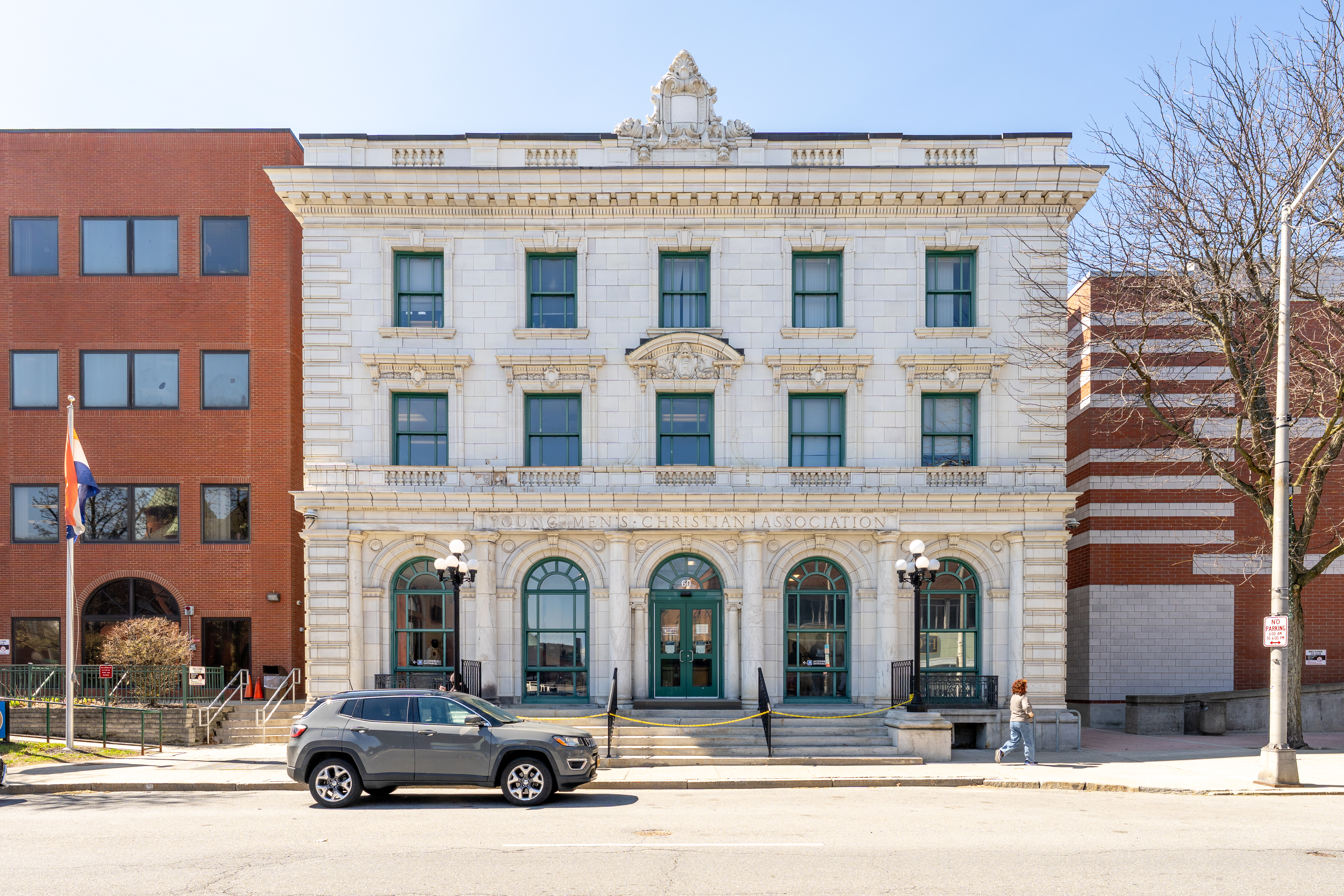
- YMCA building in 2026

- Location within New York Location within the United States
- Location: Poughkeepsie, NY
- Coordinates: 41°42′08″N 73°55′48″W
- Built: 1908
- Architect: Jackson & Rosencrans
- Architectural style: Renaissance Revival
- MPS: Poughkeepsie MRA
- NRHP reference No.: 82001171
- Added to NRHP: November 26, 1982

The Old Poughkeepsie YMCA is on the west side of Market Street near the corner of Church Street (US 44/NY 55) in Poughkeepsie in New York, United States, across from the former New York State Armory. One of many historic early 20th-century institutional buildings on Market Street, the city's main downtown thoroughfare, it has a glazed terra-cotta front facade, the only building in Poughkeepsie using that material.

== Building ==
The organization, founded before the YMCA as the Young Men's Christian Union, had previously met at an office on Union Street, next to the city's former post office. It was built in 1908 in the Renaissance Revival style, one of the few in the city, with part of a $265,000 gift from William Wallace Smith, one of Smith Brothers cough drop makers and a YMCA member and benefactor. His gift also included a neighboring office building, since demolished. The New York City firm of Jackson & Rosencrans were the architects.

In keeping with the style and era, the building features many ornamental touches, such as a molded cornice, quoins, denticulated frieze second-story balcony and domed first-floor windows. The center of the top balustrade has an elaborate cartouche.

The interior likewise boasts sliding double doors, dark-stained woodwork and brick fireplaces It was added to the National Register of Historic Places in 1982. The YMCA has since moved to different quarters a few blocks away and become the Dutchess County YMCA. The building, now attached to newer structures on either side, houses some county government offices and a few private businesses.
