= Harlow Row =

Historic house in New York, United States

- U.S. National Register of Historic Places
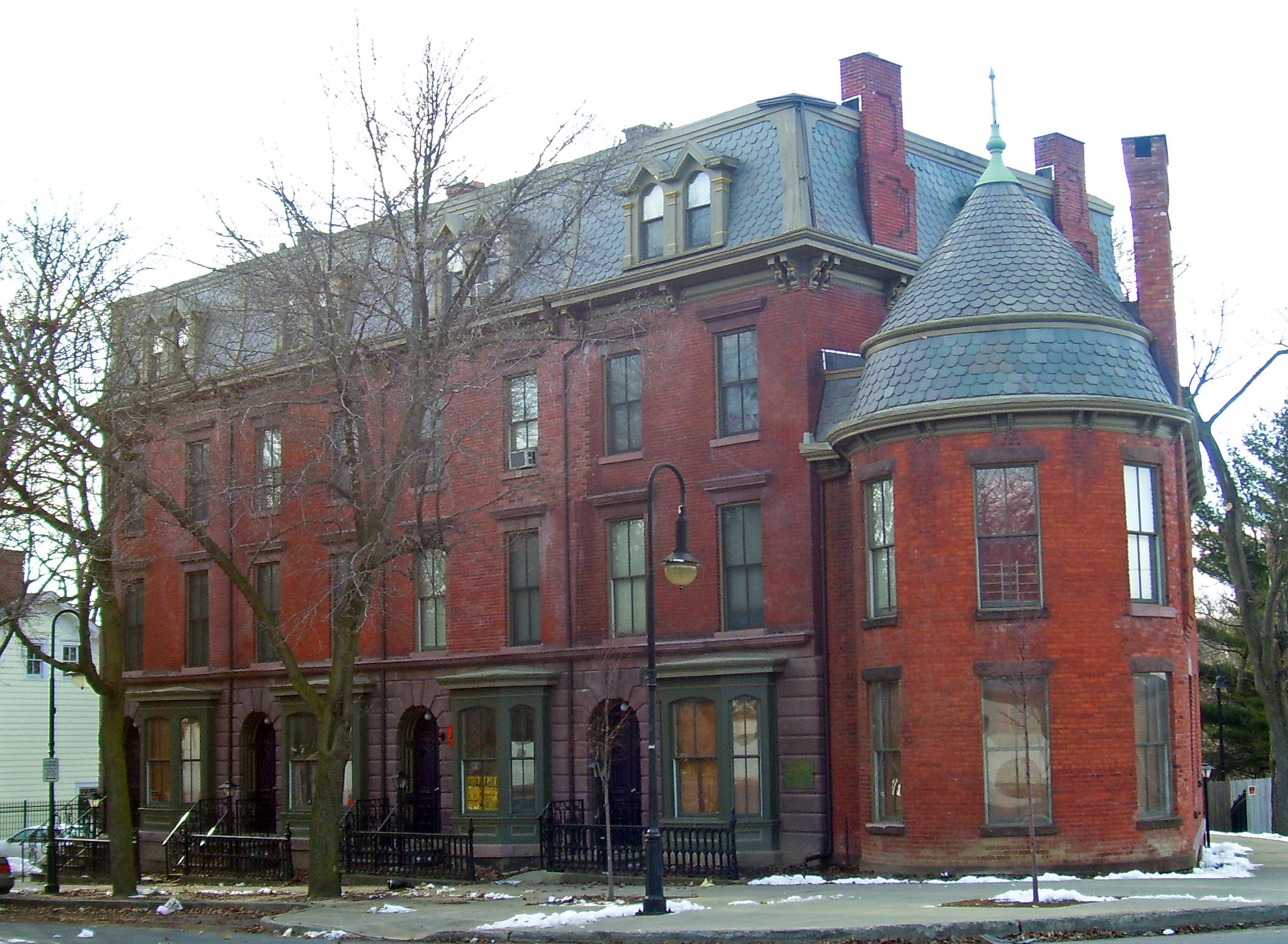
- Row in 2007
- Location: Poughkeepsie, NY
- Coordinates: 41°42′05″N 73°55′53″W
- Built: ca. 1874
- Architectural style: Second Empire, Romanesque Revival
- NRHP reference No.: 82001142
- Added to NRHP: 1982

Harlow Row, also called Brick Row, is a group of brick townhouses in Poughkeepsie, New York, United States. While their address is given as 100-106 Market Street, they are actually located on a short side street referred to as Little Market Street, across from a small park with the Soldiers' and Sailors' Memorial Fountain, on the residential southern fringe of the city's downtown.

The row consists of four red brick Second Empire townhouses, three stories in height with the mansard roofs typical of the style. The lower stories are rusticated, with arched doorways. An unusual Romanesque Revival tower is located on the north end.

They were probably built in the 1870s by William Harlow, a former mayor of the city and architect of St. Paul's Church in the city. He may have been inspired by the attempt of another former mayor, Harvey G. Eastman, to build affordable townhouses near the park now named for him, but on a smaller scale. The row appears on city tax maps from the mid-1870s with Harlow identified as owner of the whole property. However, he was not apparently successful, since the same maps list no traceable owner of the houses themselves.

In the 1880s, two local lawyers are identified as owners, and later on Charles Robinson, a liquor wholesaler. He probably added the tower sometime between 1887 and 1895. Other than some gutting of the south and west bays in 1981 to replace the windows, the houses and their period interior features remain intact. In 1982 the row was added to the National Register of Historic Places.

The houses fell into disrepair in the late 20th century, one of many highly visible historic buildings in the city to do so. In 2000 Dutchess County awarded a local nonprofit, Hudson River Housing, $194,000 to rehabilitate the row into eight rental units and four commercial spaces. In 2002 the project was completed at a total cost of almost $2 million, and the company began making the units available for lease.
