= New York State Armory (Poughkeepsie) =

Building in Poughkeepsie, New York

- U.S. National Register of Historic Places
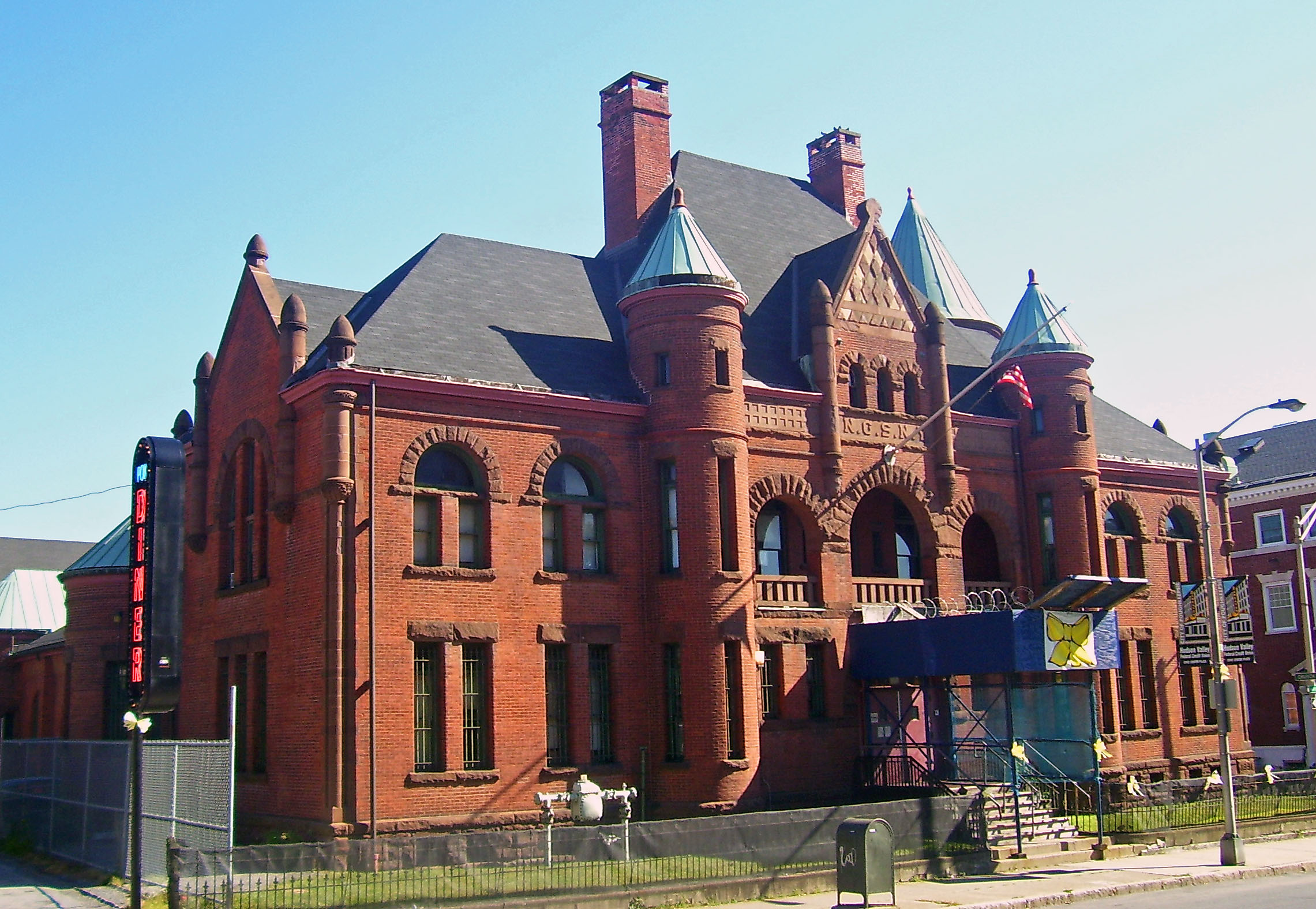
- Armory in 2007, with sign for neighboring restaurant visible
- Location: Poughkeepsie, NY
- Coordinates: 41°42′07″N 73°55′45″W
- Built: 1891–92
- Architect: Isaac G. Perry
- Architectural style: Romanesque
- NRHP reference No.: 82001154
- Added to NRHP: 1982

The New York State Armory is a historic military facility in Poughkeepsie, New York, United States. Built in 1891, it is a Romanesque-style armory designed by Isaac G. Perry, then the New York State Architect, who also designed the New York State Capitol and 26 other armories. In 1982 the Armory was listed on the National Register of Historic Places.

In 2012 it was sold to the Greater New York Seventh-Day Adventists Church in a public auction and is planned for community programs and recreation.

Located at the junction of Church (eastbound US 44/NY 55) and Market streets downtown, it is across from the Old YMCA. It is a two-and-a-half-story structure made of brick and rusticated sandstone, visible to traffic entering Poughkeepsie from the west via the Mid-Hudson Bridge. Its interior features, such as oak lockers, staircases and floors, are well-preserved. It also retains the original pressed metal ceilings and light fixtures.

Governor David Hill attended the cornerstone laying on Memorial Day (then called Decoration Day) in 1891, and spoke of the importance of maintaining state-level military facilities and the respectability conferred by service in the Guard. The armory was completed the following year.

Troops were later deployed from here to the Spanish–American War and both 20th-century world wars. It has been host to a variety of events from basketball tournaments to birthday parties for Franklin D. Roosevelt, a resident of nearby Hyde Park. The Company A, 101st Signal Battalion of the New York Army National Guard were stationed in the Armory, however, in 2011 the National Guard moved the remaining 200 soldiers stationed there to Camp Smith down the Hudson River near Peekskill.

== See also ==
- List of armories and arsenals in New York City and surrounding counties
- National Register of Historic Places listings in Poughkeepsie, New York
