= Church of the Holy Comforter =

Church of the Holy Comforter may refer to the following churches:

- A church in the Episcopal Diocese of Atlanta, Georgia
- A church in Kenilworth, Illinois
- An 1888 church in Lutherville, Maryland
- Church of the Holy Comforter (Brownsville, Minnesota)
- Church of the Holy Comforter (Poughkeepsie, New York)
- Church of the Holy Comforter, Staten Island, New York, now St. Alban's Episcopal Church (Staten Island), New York
- St. Athanasius Episcopal Church and Parish House and the Church of the Holy Comforter, Burlington, North Carolina
- A Recorded Texas Historic Landmark in Cleburne, Texas
