= Mill Street–North Clover Street Historic District =

Historic district in New York, United States

- Mill Street–North Clover Street; Historic District
- U.S. National Register of Historic Places
- U.S. Historic district
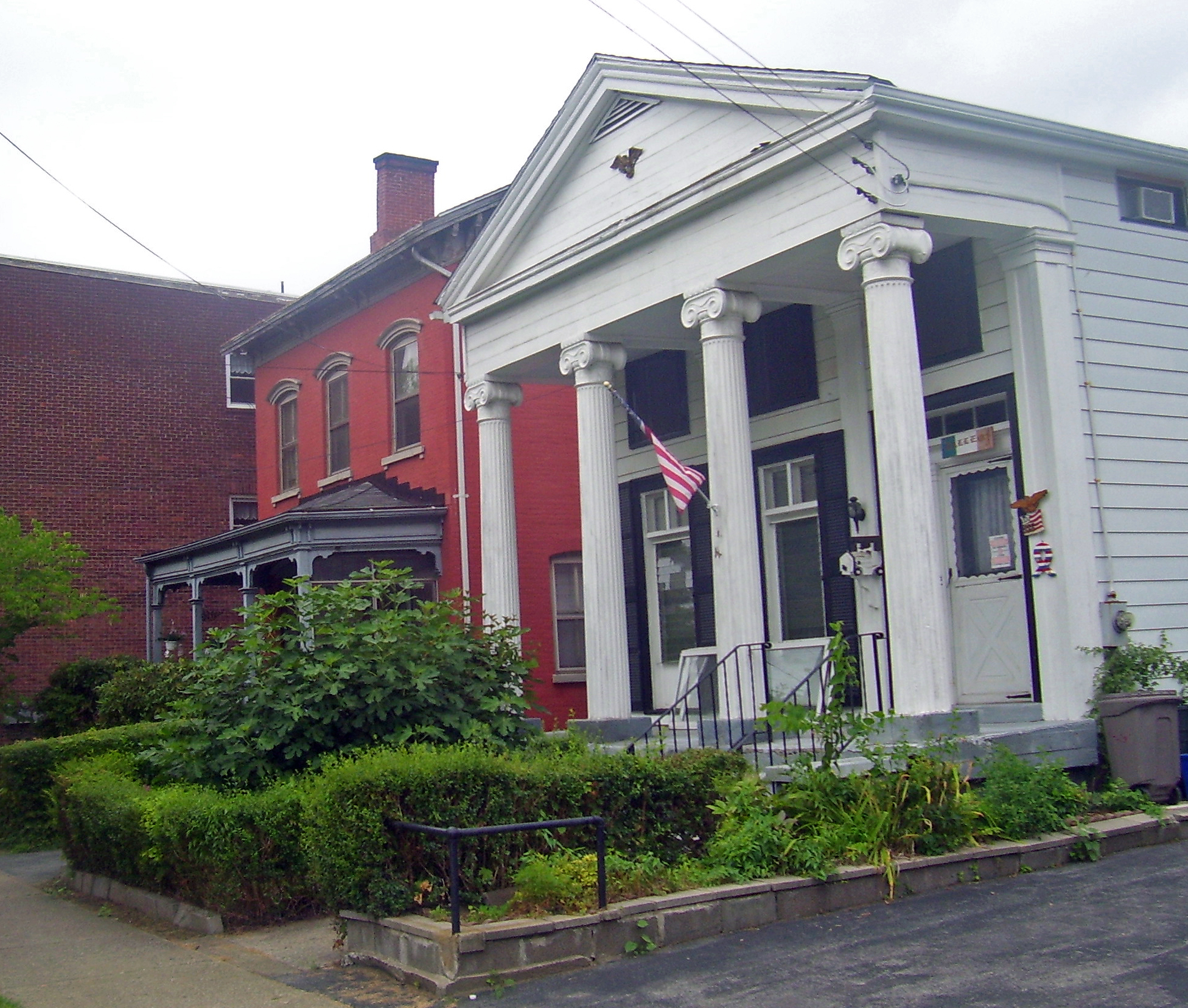
- Houses on North Clover Street, 2008

- Location within New York Location within the United States

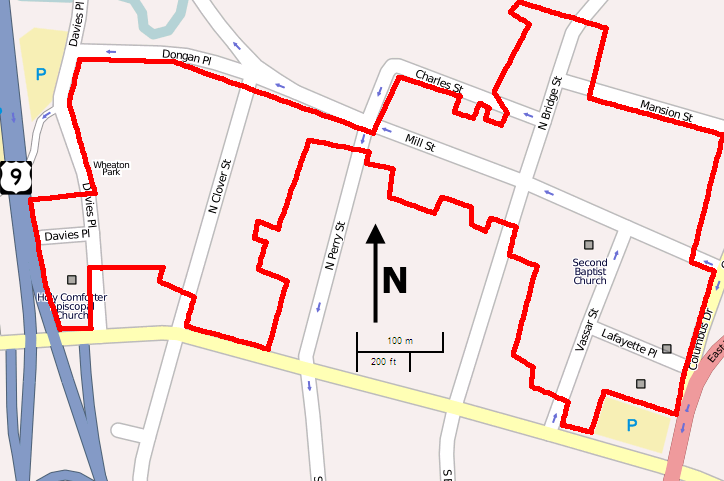
- Map showing current boundaries of district
- Location: Poughkeepsie, NY
- Coordinates: 41°42′24″N 73°56′1″W
- Area: 27 acres (11 ha)
- Architectural style: Greek Revival, Italianate, Queen Anne (original); Greek Revival, Second Empire (increase)
- NRHP reference No.: 72000834 (original); 87000812 (increase)
- Added to NRHP: February 7, 1972 (original); May 21, 1987 (increase)

The Mill Street–North Clover Street Historic District is located along those streets and Main Street in western Poughkeepsie, New York, United States. It is an irregularly-shaped area of 27 acres (11 ha) between US 9 and downtown Poughkeepsie, located on the slope up from the Hudson River. There are roughly 139 historic buildings, and very few new ones.

It was listed on the National Register of Historic Places in 1972. Like the Union Street Historic District to its south, the neighborhood remained virtually unchanged from the 19th century when it first began to grow and develop. It includes as contributing properties some listed on the Register in their own right, like the Vassar Institute, Vassar Home for Aged Men (both now home to a local arts center) and Church of the Holy Comforter, designed by Richard Upjohn.

At that time, Poughkeepsie was clearing and demolishing many old neighborhoods as part of its urban renewal programs. The historic districts were established to preserve what would not be demolished. Two areas of historic buildings adjacent to the district, on Main and North Bridge streets, were not included because they were meant to be razed as well. But those plans were canceled, and in 1987 the district's boundaries were increased by a few acres to include the still-extant blocks.

== Geography ==
In its current form the district is somewhat horseshoe-shaped, touching Main Street in two small areas on the south and connecting its two larger neighborhoods via Mill Street in the north. These boundaries were mostly established on the initial listing in 1972.

The underlying land slopes up gently from Route 9 to where the land levels off at the western edge of downtown Poughkeepsie. On the west, it takes in Church of the Holy Comforter and the houses on Davies Place just across from it and Wheaton Park to the north. All the property on North Clover, the next street to the west, is included except the west corner of the Main Street intersection on the south. The homes at 105-115 Main to the east were one of the 1987 additions.

In the north it narrows for a short distance to include just the property on the south side of Mill, then expands again to both sides of the street after the North Perry Street intersection, even including some of the Charles Street buildings to their north. Two blocks of North Bridge Street to the north are within the district, as well as some short adjacent sections of Charles and Mansion streets. South of the intersection is the other area added to the district later.

The eastern portion is bordered on the north by the south side of Mansion Street, turning south along the rear property lines of the west side of Washington Street to Mill Street again, then including that side of the street all the way to the rear lines of the north side of Main Street. The district boundary is at Main Street to include the Vassar Home for Aged Men building, where it crosses the street and follows the rear lines on the other side to the North Bridge Street properties. Almost all of Vassar Street, and all of Lafayette Street, are within the district.

Most of the district is residential, with a few churches and other institutional buildings. Many are of brick, often in the Second Empire style not commonly used with that material. There are some Federal and Greek Revival buildings, most notably the Second Baptist Church, Poughkeepsie's only remaining church in the latter style, scattered throughout.

The only commercial areas are along Main and the Mill–North Clover intersection. Wheaton Park is the district's major open space. Past demolitions have also left some lots vacant.

== History ==
In 1702, a Dutch settler, Baltus Van Kleeck, built the first house in what would later become Poughkeepsie. It was located on the path that would become Mill Street, near the intersection with the future Vassar Street. Mill Street was one of the first paths between the settlement of Poughkeepsie on the plateau and the river. As it developed into a more permanent street, the area grew. The coming of the Hudson River Railroad, which passed close to the neighborhood on the west, in the 1850s added to its prosperity. By mid-century it had become Poughkeepsie's downtown. All of its historic buildings were erected between 1840 and 1875.

One of its great benefactors was Matthew Vassar and his descendants. The family's property and residences gave their name to Vassar Street, where their main landholding was. In 1835 they tore down Van Kleeck's original house.

Their ownership of the land on which the Second Baptist Church was located led to it being called the "Vassar Temple" due to its colonnaded facade and use as a synagogue after the Civil War. His nephews built the eclectic brick Vassar Institute and Vassar Home for Aged Men on family land, now at Vassar and Main, to carry on the family's educational and charitable traditions, in the early 1880s.

The neighborhood remained mostly unchanged well into the 20th century, when it was spared from urban renewal by the work of local preservationists. The cancellation of many urban renewal plans led to the boundary increase in 1987.

== Significant contributing properties ==
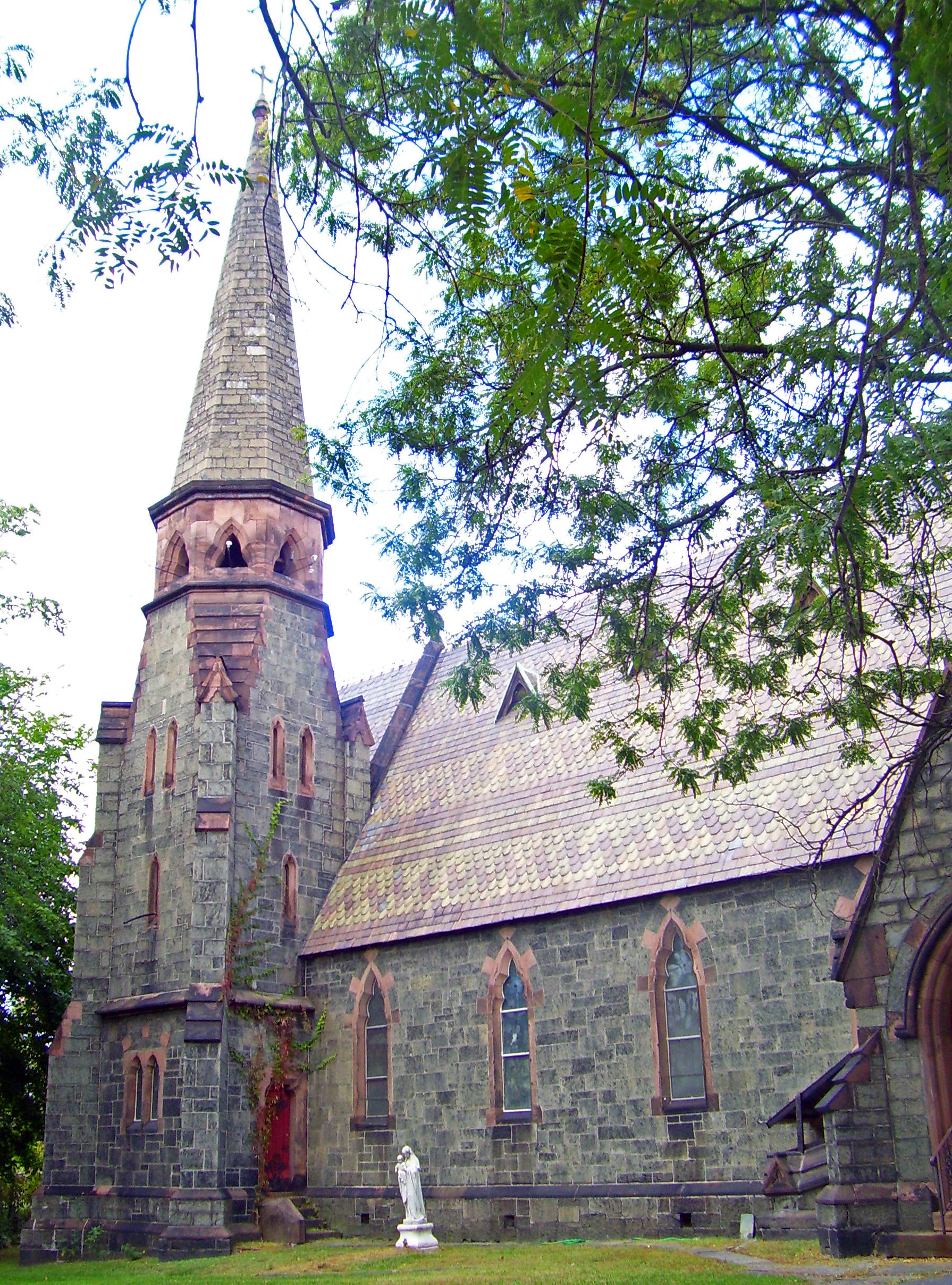
Church of the Holy Comforter

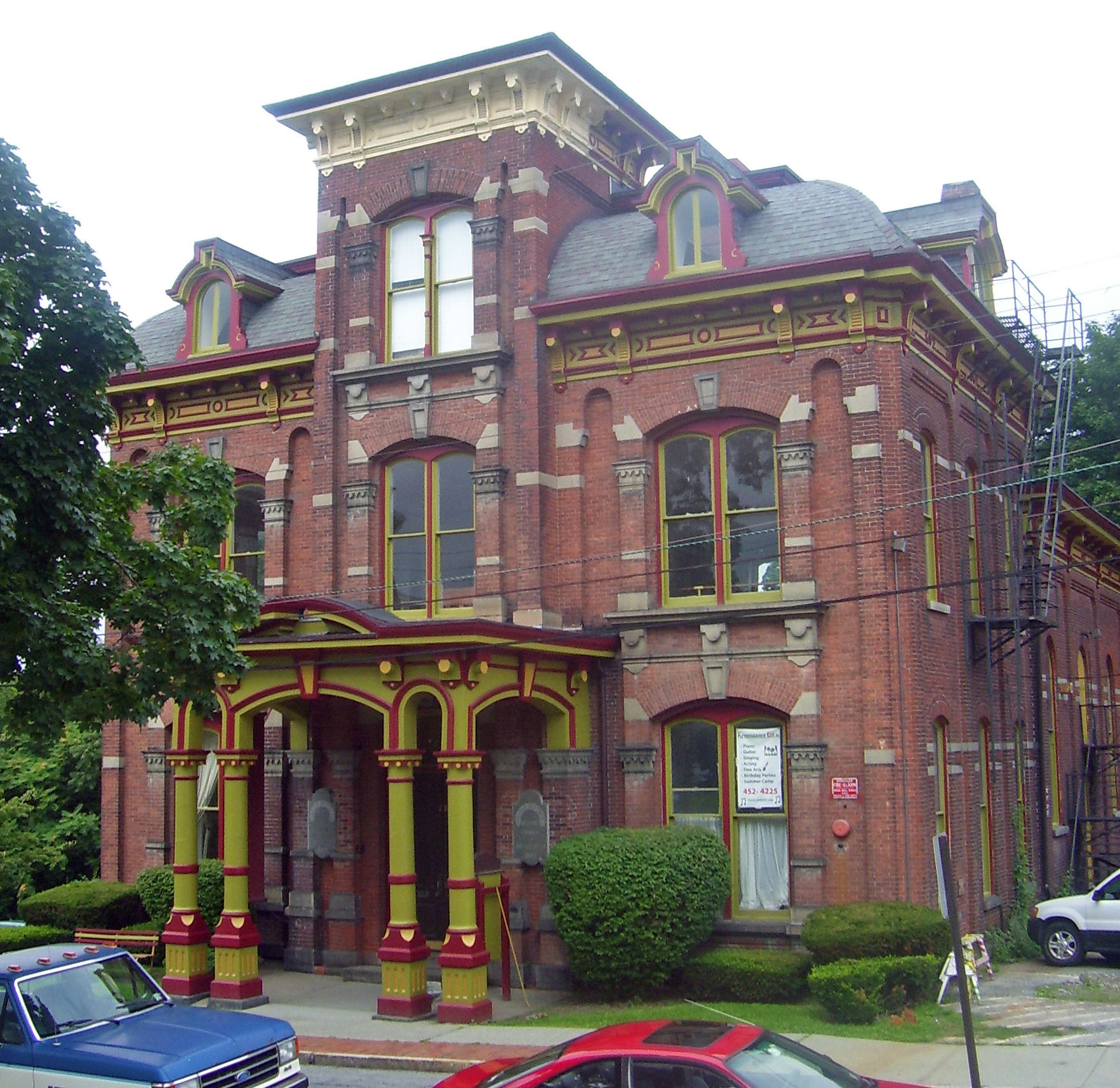
Vassar Institute

Five buildings within the district were separately listed on the National Register just prior to the district itself. They include two churches, two institutional buildings and one house now used as an organization's headquarters.

- Church of the Holy Comforter. 1860 Gothic Revival church on Davies Place, originally Episcopal but now Anglican Catholic, designed by Richard Upjohn. Steeple is a city landmark to drivers on neighboring Route 9.
- Italian Center. Late Victorian brick townhouse now used as headquarters for local Italian American organization.
- Second Baptist Church. Only Greek Revival church left in the city, at Vassar and Mill streets. Later known as "Vassar Temple" due to that family's ownership of the land, the colonnaded front facade and its later use as a synagogue.
- Vassar Home for Aged Men. 1880 senior citizens' home at Vassar and Main now serves as offices for Cunneen-Hackett Arts Center and some other local nonprofits.
- Vassar Institute. Eclectic 1882 brick building just across from the Home for Aged Men. Now the main building for the arts center programs.
