= John Ellison Vassar =

- Born: January 13, 1813; Poughkeepsie, Dutchess County, New York
- Died: December 6, 1878 (aged 65); Poughkeepsie, Dutchess County, New York

John Ellison Vassar (1813–1878) was an American lay preacher and missionary.

== Early life ==
John Ellison Vassar was born January 13, 1813, and named for his maternal uncle. He was the son of Thomas Vassar of Norfolk, England. Originally named "Vasseur", the family was descended from French Huguenots who arrived in England in the mid-eighteenth century. Thomas's family were Baptists, and he and his younger brother James (father of noted brewer and philanthropist Matthew Vassar) emigrated to the United States in 1796. They settled near the village of Poughkeepsie, New York, and took up farming on the Wappingers Creek near Manchester Bridge. Thomas married Joanna Ellison of Flatbush on Long Island.

Thomas returned to Norfolk briefly to obtain implements and seeds. Upon his return, he and his brother planted the first crop of barley in Dutchess County. They then began to brew ale, which they sold to supplement their income. Their product was so popular that they sold the farm and James moved to Poughkeepsie to start a brewery, while Thomas established a brickyard on the Dutchess Turnpike.

John Ellison Vassar began working in the brickyard at the age of twelve. When Vassar was twenty years old he sustained a severe injury when his foot slipped through a log bridge over a creek near his house. This left him with a limp.

== Missionary ==
John Ellison Vassar married Mary Lee and moved to Poughkeepsie. While working at his cousin's brewery, he began attending revival meetings at the nearby Baptist church. He left the brewery and devoted his time and money to missionary work. In 1850 he became an agent and colporteur of the American Tract Society, and traveled as its representative throughout Illinois and other parts west. Thereafter he worked in New York and New England.

During the Civil War he was at the front with the Union Armies. In early 1863 Vassar was in Alexandria, Virginia. Just before the Battle of Gettysburg he was captured by General J. E. B. Stuart's cavalry who were quick to release him in order to avoid his importunate prayers and preaching.

== Evangelist ==
After the war, his missionary work for the Tract Society took him to Virginia, the Carolinas, and Florida. He was popularly known as "Uncle John". Known for his zeal and powerful preaching, John Ellison Vassar was one of America's most widely known evangelists.
