= Vassar Institute =

- Vassar Brothers Institute
- U.S. National Register of Historic Places
- U.S. Historic district – Contributing property
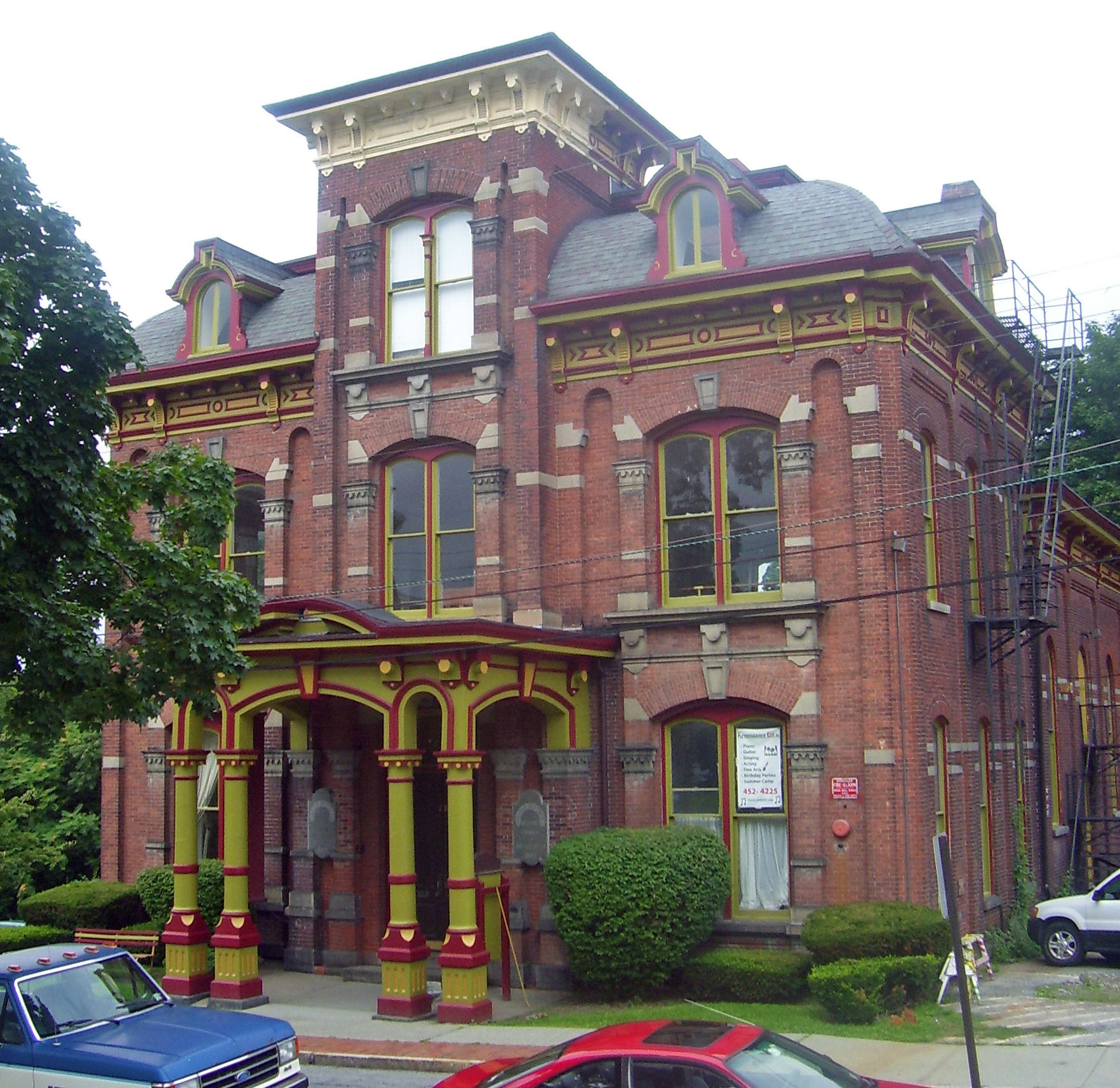
- East elevation and north profile, 2008
- Location: Poughkeepsie, NY
- Coordinates: 41°42′18″N 73°55′54″W
- Built: 1882
- Architect: J.A. Wood
- Architectural style: Second Empire, Italianate
- Part of: Mill Street-North Clover Street Historic District
- NRHP reference No.: 72001540
- Added to NRHP: January 20, 1972

The Vassar Institute building is located at Main and Vassar streets in Poughkeepsie, New York, United States, across from the architecturally similar Vassar Home for Aged Men. It is a late-19th-century building combining the Italianate and Second Empire architectural styles.

It was established by Matthew Vassar's nephews on the site of the brewery which established the family fortune. It has served as a museum and art studio in the past, and has a 300-seat auditorium in the rear. In 1972 it was listed on the National Register of Historic Places. Later it also became a contributing property to the Mill Street-North Clover Street Historic District. Both it and the Home for Aged Men are now used by the Cunneen-Hackett Arts Center.

== Building ==
The building is a two-story, three-bay building in running bond with granite trim. The masonry walls with balloon framing inside are faced in brick in running bond. It is topped with a mansard roof, with four round-arched dormer windows and projecting Italianate tower. At the roofline is a carved wooden cornice with alternating large and small brackets, above a frieze with applied moldings in geometric patterns.

A large portico projects from the middle of the east (front) facade. It is supported by two pairs of columns with granite capitals on an iron plinth base. Atop them is a broken arch pediment.

The building's heavy and ornate exterior is a direct contrast to its spacious, open interior. The main entrance opens onto a hall which leads to the auditorium at the rear. The approximately 200 original cast-iron seats are arranged on four descending, curving levels, with leatherette upholstery. On either side is a balcony with circular box, supported by wooden columns with brackets and ball drops, and two tall, round-arched stained glass windows. The proscenium has vestiges of the original valances.

== Aesthetics ==
An eclectic combination of Victorian styles can be seen in the Vassar Institute building: the decorative cornices of Italianate buildings, the heaviness of the mansard roof common on Second Empire buildings. Many features are similar to designs by James Renwick Jr., for the early buildings of Vassar College in the 1860s. The colorful exterior recalls the polychrome brick buildings of the preceding decades as well.

== History ==
The Vassars spent $30,000 ($1,001,000 in contemporary dollars) to put up the Institute on the site of their uncle's brewery, furthering the family's interest in education and culture. J.A. Wood, whose work included major hotel such as the Tampa Bay Hotel, had his design completed in 1882.

Its first floor was a natural history museum and the second story a library, also providing home offices to the Poughkeepsie Literary Society and Poughkeepsie Society of Natural Sciences. The third floor was, and still is, an art studio. The auditorium hosted a lecture series on winter Tuesdays.

Later, the Eastman Business College used some of the rooms. During the 1930s, the Community Theater put on its plays in the auditorium. By the late 1960s the building was little-used and neglected, in need of new heating and plumbing. Many community groups showed interest in renovating it, and eventually the Cunneen-Hackett Arts Center was able to do so. It has since renovated the theater and turned some of the space into a 1,200-square-foot (110 m^{2}) dance studio, artists' lofts and a music-instruction studio in addition to art galleries.
