= Italian Center =

Historic house in New York, United States

- U.S. National Register of Historic Places
- U.S. Historic district – Contributing property
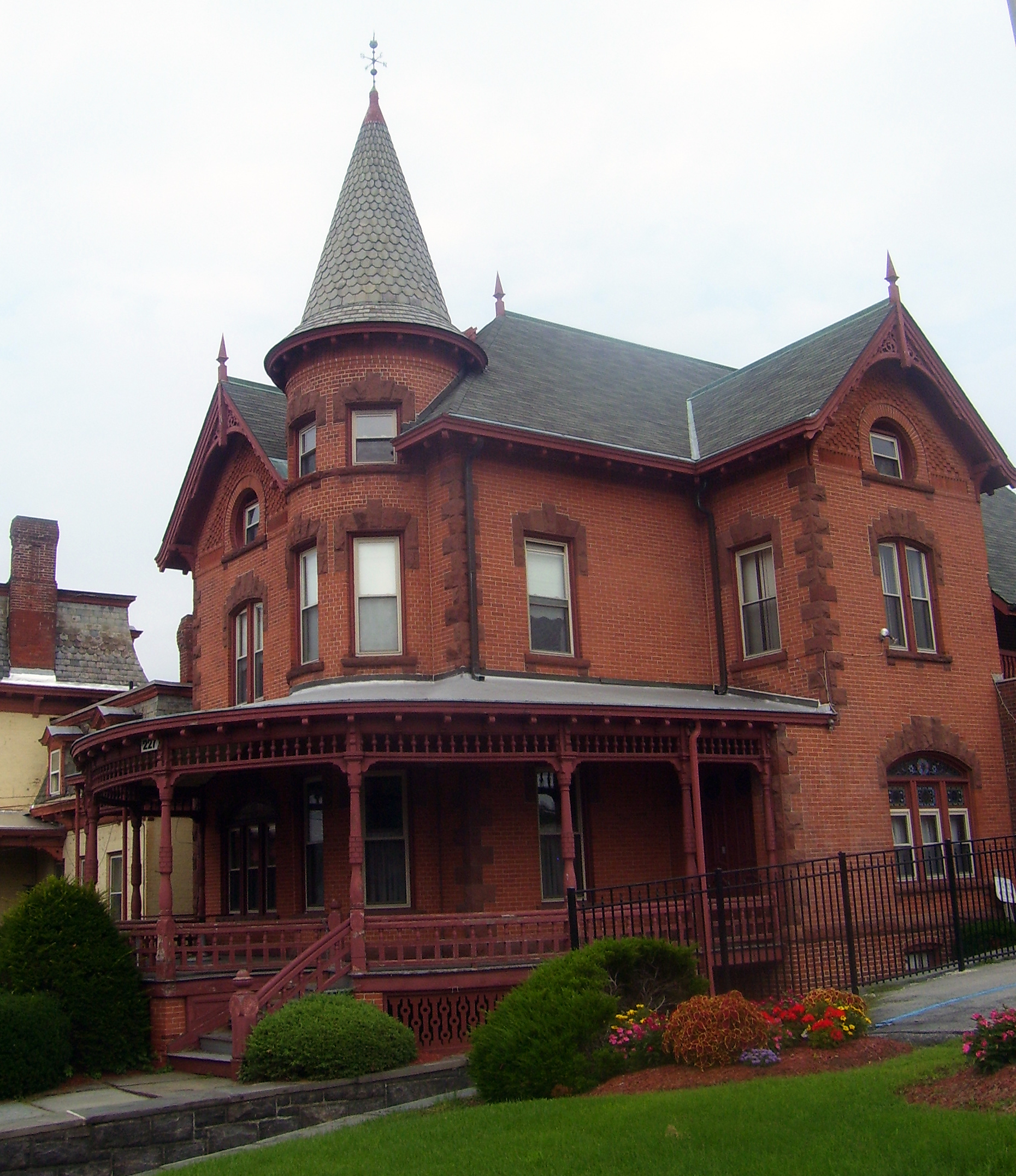
- East profile and south elevation, 2008
- Location: Poughkeepsie, NY
- Coordinates: 41°42′23″N 73°55′48″W
- Built: ca. 1857
- Architectural style: Queen Anne
- Part of: Mill Street-North Clover Street Historic District (ID72000834)
- NRHP reference No.: 72000833

Significant dates
- Added to NRHP: April 19, 1972
- Designated CP: February 7, 1972

The Italian Center is the name commonly used for a mid-19th-century house that is home to the organization of the same name on Mill Street in Poughkeepsie, New York, United States. It is a contributing property to the Mill Street-North Clover Street Historic District.

It was first built as a simple building by 1857 and gradually expanded and renovated into its current form over the next 30 years. The Italian Center was formed in 1928 and bought the house the same year, expanding it in the 1960s with a discreet rear wing. On April 19, 1972, it was listed on the National Register of Historic Places.

== Building ==
The two-story building is near the eastern boundary of the historic district, a half-block west of the intersection of Mill and Columbus Drive, at the western fringe of downtown Poughkeepsie where the ground begins a gradual slope down to the Hudson River. It is faced in brick in running bond with stone rustication at the corners and windows. Projecting gable and a tower in front reach a third storey.

The roof is slate, with sharp finials atop the gables and tower; the gables have been further decorated with bargeboards. A chimney and dormer pierce both slopes of the roof. There is no real cornice, just a row of wooden brackets under the eaves. A row of bricks on the third storey at the south (front) facade has been arranged in a corrugated pattern.

Fenestration includes a first-floor triple window with curved transom top in stained glass. It is echoed by a double window with curved top on the second storey.

A veranda wraps around the south gable to the double-doored main entrance on the east. It is supported by seven turned columns with a spindle decoration at the roofline. The railing is in a grid pattern with a large square newel and acorn-shaped top where it reaches the front steps.

A large, modern rear wing extends from the north. It was completed after the house was listed on the Register and is meant not to intrude, as it cannot be seen from the front.

== History ==
The house is first shown on an 1857 map of the city as an L-shaped building, at a time when that neighborhood was the city's most desirable residential area. Thirty years later, another map shows an east wing, and by 1891 the porch and tower are shown.

In 1928, five local organizations that served the city's Italian American community merged to become the Italian Center and moved into the house. In the 1960s they built a rear wing on the house to accommodate larger events. There have been no other significant alterations to the house since.
