= St. Alban's Episcopal Church (Staten Island) =

Episcopal church in Staten Island, New York

- St. Alban's Episcopal Church ( Church of the Holy Comforter )
- U.S. National Register of Historic Places
- New York City Landmark
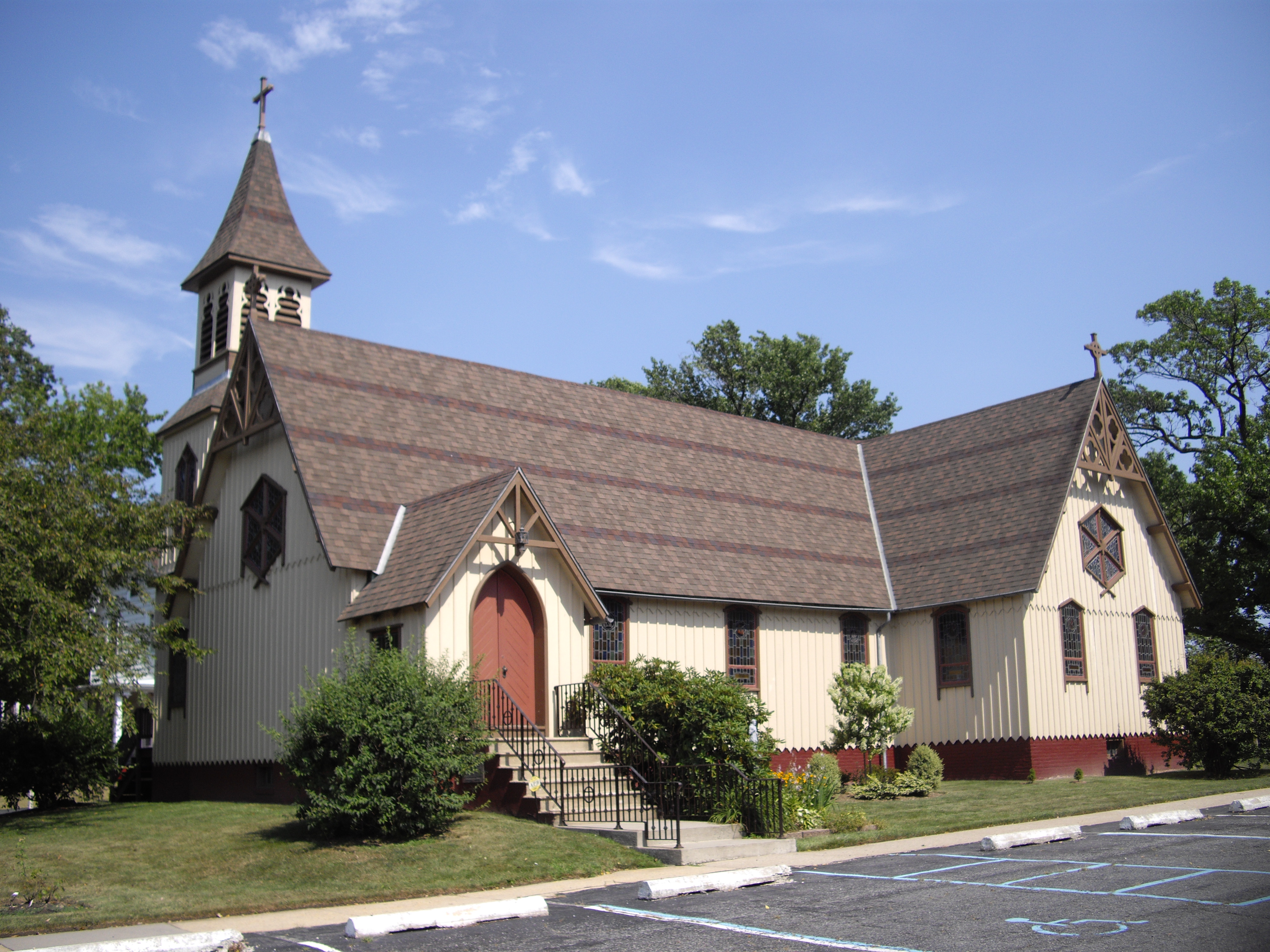
- St. Alban's Episcopal Church
- Location: 76 St. Alban's Place; Staten Island, New York
- Coordinates: 40°32′37″N 74°9′40″W
- Built: 1865
- Architect: Richard M. Upjohn
- Architectural style: Carpenter Gothic
- NRHP reference No.: 82001264
- NYCL No.: 1113

Significant dates
- Added to NRHP: October 29, 1982
- Designated NYCL: September 9, 1980

St. Alban's Episcopal Church is an active parish in the Episcopal Diocese of New York, in the United States. The building is an historic Carpenter Gothic style church now located at 76 St. Alban's Place in Eltingville, Staten Island. It was built in 1865 as the Church of the Holy Comforter at what is now 3939 Richmond Avenue, the present site of the South Shore YMCA, and was designed by Richard Michell Upjohn, the son of the noted Carpenter Gothic architect, Richard Upjohn. In 1873, the building was split in half and moved to its present location, where it was re-assembled and expanded. In 1951, Holy Comforter absorbed the congregation of nearby St. Anne's Episcopal Church, Great Kills, and changed its name to St. Alban's. St. Anne's had been founded in 1929 as an offshoot of Holy Comforter.

The church reported 60 members in 2015 and 28 members in 2023; no membership statistics were reported in 2024 parochial reports. Plate and pledge income reported for the congregation in 2024 was $98,605 with average Sunday attendance (ASA) of 28 persons.

On October 29, 1982, St. Alban's was added to the National Register of Historic Places. In 1984, it acquired an 1883-vintage Hook & Hastings organ, believed to be the oldest pipe organ that currently exists in a Staten Island church.

== See also ==
- Church of the Holy Comforter (disambiguation)
- List of New York City Designated Landmarks in Staten Island
- List of Registered Historic Places in Richmond County, New York
- National Register of Historic Places listings in Richmond County, New York
