= Vassar Home for Aged Men =

- U.S. National Register of Historic Places
- U.S. Historic district – Contributing property
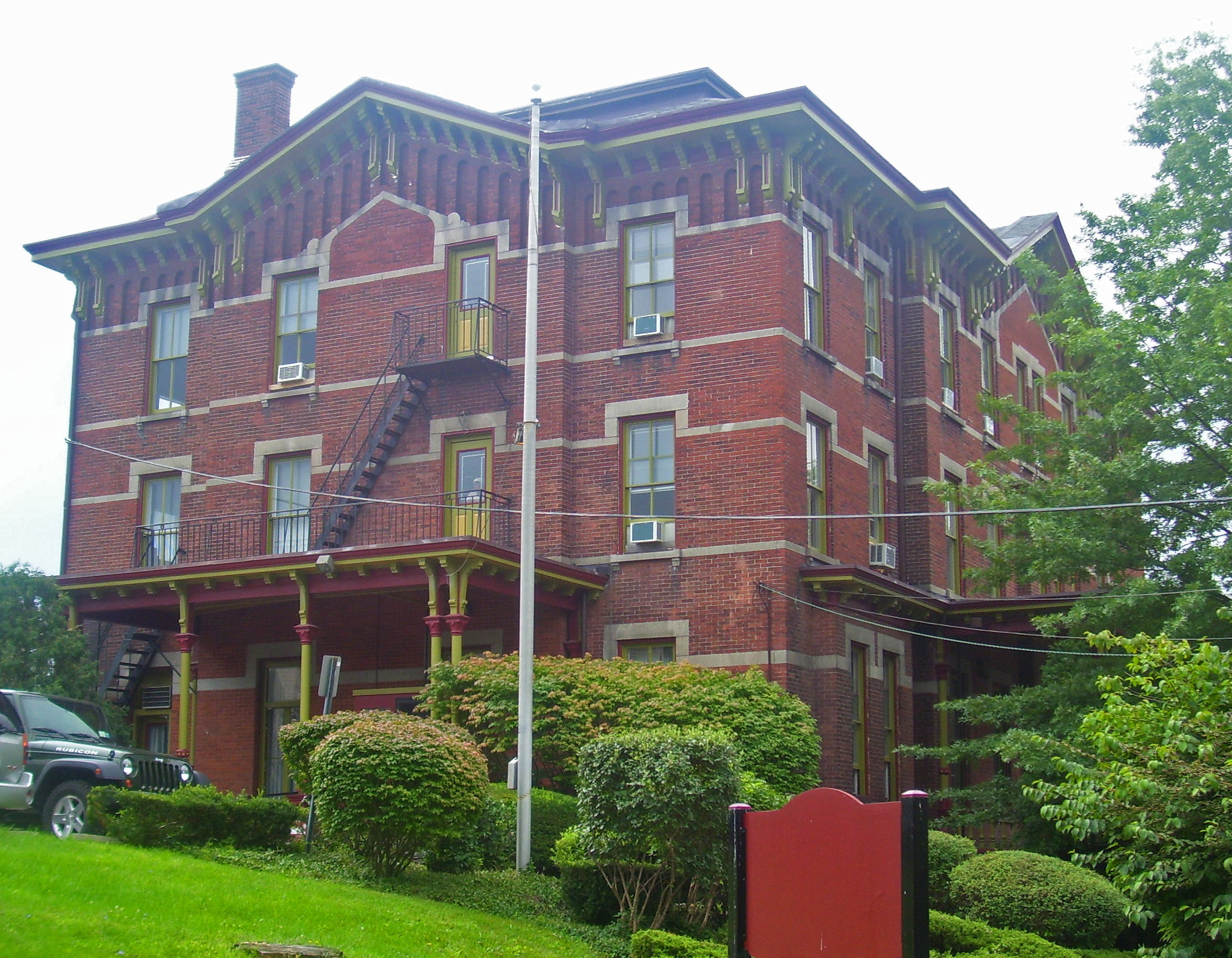
- North profile and east elevation, 2008
- Location: Poughkeepsie, NY
- Coordinates: 41°42′18″N 73°55′51″W
- Built: 1880
- Architectural style: Italianate
- Part of: Mill Street-North Clover Street Historic District
- NRHP reference No.: 72000837
- Added to NRHP: April 13, 1972

The former Vassar Home for Aged Men is located at Main and Vassar streets in Poughkeepsie, New York, United States. It is just across the street from the architecturally similar Vassar Institute, and both buildings are credited to architect J.A. Wood. In the 1970s it became the Cunneen-Hackett Arts Center.

It was established in the 1880s by the nephews of Matthew Vassar, founder of Vassar College, as a home for elderly men but was not fully occupied until the early 20th century. It continued in that use for most of the century, and was among the first buildings in the city listed on the National Register of Historic Places in 1972. Later that year it also became a contributing property to the Mill Street-North Clover Street Historic District. Today it, like the Institute building, is owned by a local arts group, which rents some of the space in the building to other local non-profit organizations.

== Building ==
The Home is a three-story building nine bays wide on its western (front) facade, where the basement is also exposed. It is faced in brick laid in running bond with granite trim, over masonry walls on a balloon frame. The sheet metal roof has a wide cornice with large, vertically elongated brackets at the corners and smaller ones in between.

A five-bay pavilion projects from the east, with a veranda running its full length. It is enclosed by a baluster railing, which continues down the steps, and supported by freestanding columns at the front and engaged ones at the rear. Similar, smaller verandas can be found on the other sides.

Inside, the rear stairway has a large carved newel post. Both parlors have Neoclassical black marble mantels that were preserved from an earlier building. Two later black marble mantels are in the reception room, which has a carved Louis XVI-style wooden screen supported by four Corinthian columns.

== History ==
The Home was built by Vassar's nephews on the site of his old house, incorporating some of the original interior trim, such as the black marble mantels. It cost $45,000 ($1,501,000 in contemporary dollars) to build and was completed in 1880. The following year it was officially opened.

Designed for 50 men, it was initially home to six who met the criteria of being at least 65 years old, Protestant and residents of New York State. It continued to operate below capacity until 1903, when the death of Matthew Vassar's widow made enough money available.

It remained a senior citizen's home throughout much of the 20th century. In the 1970s, it became the property of the Cunneen-Hackett Arts Center, which has used the lower floor for galleries, public and private events, and rented out the upper floors as office space for other local non-profit organizations.
