= Springside (Poughkeepsie, New York) =

Historic house in New York, United States

- U.S. National Register of Historic Places
- U.S. National Historic Landmark
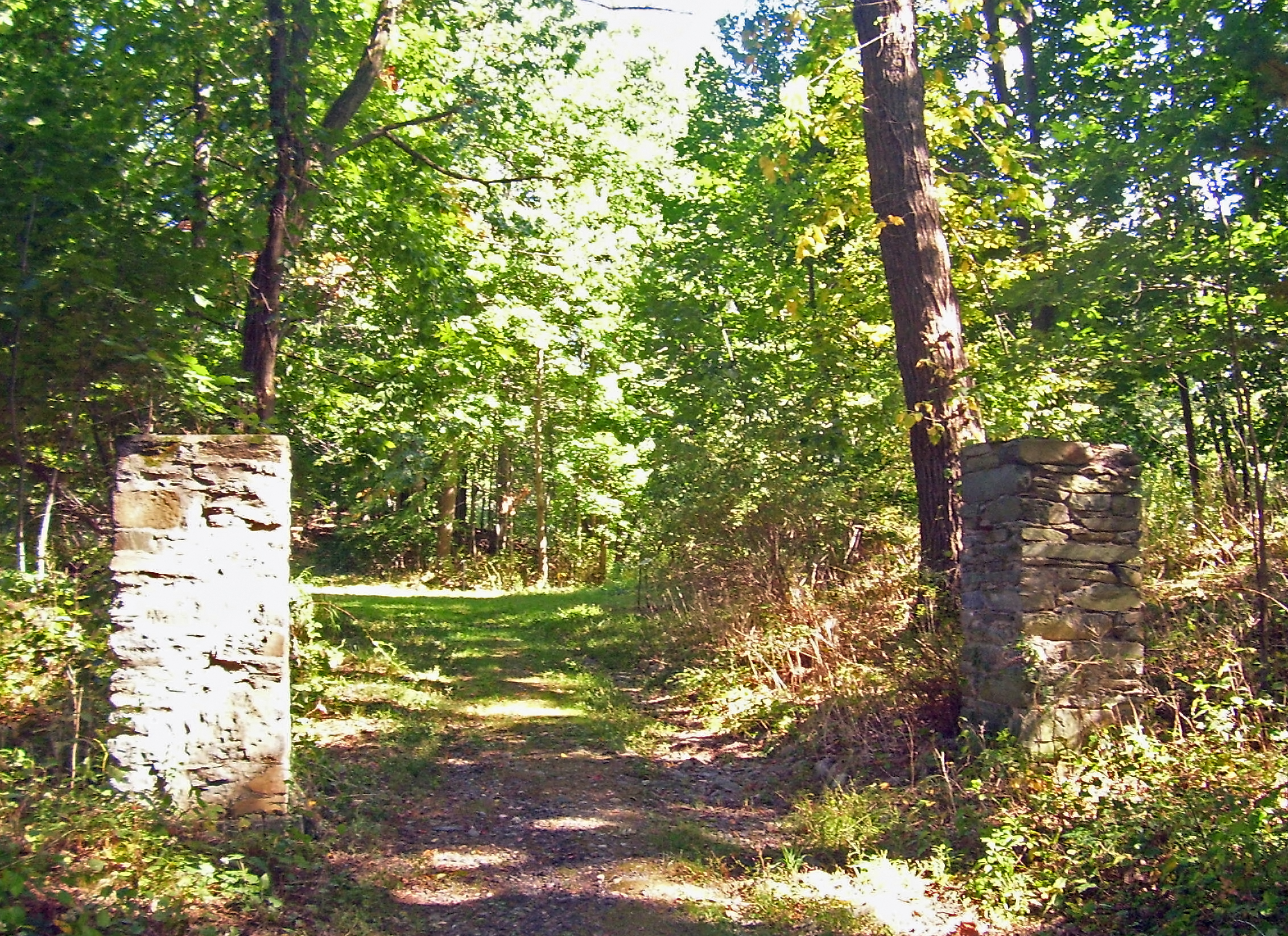
- Surviving gateposts at cottage entrance, 2007
- Location: Poughkeepsie, NY
- Coordinates: 41°41′21″N 73°55′43″W
- Area: 26.5 acres (11 ha)
- Built: 1850–52
- Architect: Andrew Jackson Downing, Calvert Vaux
- Architectural style: Gothic Revival
- NRHP reference No.: 69000141

Significant dates
- Added to NRHP: August 11, 1969
- Designated NHL: August 11, 1969

Springside was the estate of Matthew Vassar in Poughkeepsie, New York, United States. It is located on Academy Street just off US 9. Detailed plans for a landscape, villa, and complex of farm buildings were drawn up by the influential Andrew Jackson Downing with assistance of Calvert Vaux prior to the former's death. The landscaping was completed and remains Downing's most intact surviving landscape, but only a few of the buildings he planned were ever built; most have since been lost to fire and structural failure. A cottage where Vassar resided was dismantled and removed in the mid-1970s. Its facade is on display in the New York State Museum.

Downing's landscape, in the English landscape gardening tradition, has survived several serious efforts to redevelop the property in the last half-century due to opposition from local preservationists. It was listed on the National Register of Historic Places as Matthew Vassar Estate, and further it was declared a National Historic Landmark in 1969, but the estate was not permanently protected for almost two decades, when a lawsuit was settled with the transfer of the land to its current owners, Springside Landscape Restoration.

== History ==
Springside's development took up much of the last two years of Downing's life, and the latter years of Vassar's. The unfinished estate was maintained and developed by several other families for a century afterward. Their descendants were more amenable to selling the land for development in the years afterward, which led in turn to the efforts to protect and restore it.

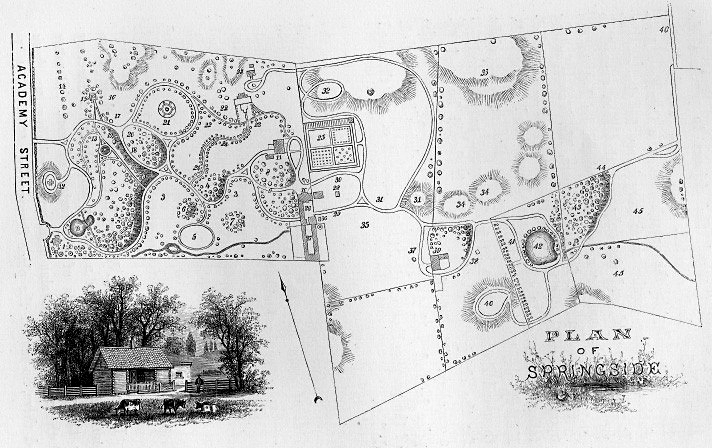
Downing's original site plan.

=== Planning and development under Vassar ===
The Springside property was the "Allen farm", first a family farm, then an ornamental farm of roughly 45 acres (18 ha), twice its current size. It takes its name from a spring on the property. It was considered as a site for a cemetery by the then-village of Poughkeepsie in 1848. Vassar, a village trustee and founder of the nearby college that bears his name, bought the property from its last owner George Bloom Evertson for $8,000, intending to sell subscriptions to future plots at the cemetery to local investors, a common practice at the time. However, there were few takers. He had planned to develop the property as a private summer estate himself if the cemetery plan failed, and so he contracted Downing, who lived downriver in Newburgh, to begin planning the landscape for the property.

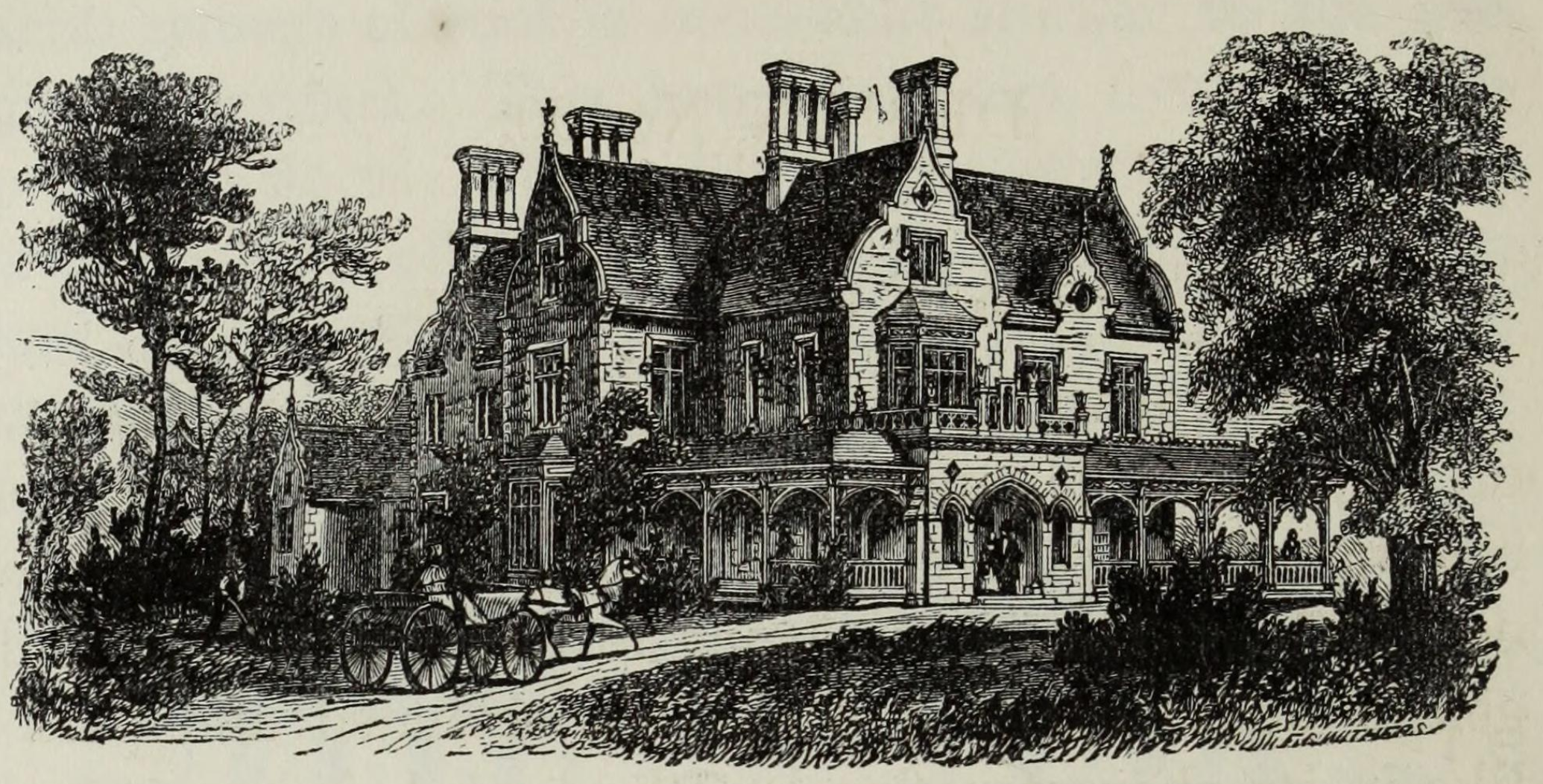
First design for the main house, planned and never built.

By 1851, Downing, in collaboration with his associate Calvert Vaux and Vassar, had detailed landscape plans ready. The next year, the city of Poughkeepsie chose another site for the cemetery, ending that possibility. Downing's death in a steamboat boiler explosion the following year did not halt development, as Vassar and Vaux continued along the lines Downing had established. At least two of Downing's planned structures, a barn and a gardeners' cottage, were built, and he eventually invested $100,000 in developing the site. The villa they designed to be the main house of the estate, a semi-Jacobethan work, was abandoned (although artists' renderings survive), since Vassar preferred the cottage as a residence. As Springside continued to grow and develop, Vassar regularly opened the lands to the public until he retired to it full-time in 1867, the year before his death. It became a popular place to visit and inspired poetry and songs. One visitor, Russell Comstock, wrote:

We took a stroll over the ground of M. Vassar, Esq . . . and a more charming spot we never visited. There is combined within these precincts every variety of park-like pictorial landscape that is to be found in any part of our country – meadows, woodlands, water-courses, jets and fountains, elevated summits gently sloping into valleys, forming the natural openings for the roads to girdle the hills and knolls, and thence again reaching upward to the highest peaks, from whence the eye at one glance can survey almost every spot of the entire enclosure.

=== After Vassar ===
After Vassar's death, the lands were divided among several other local families, who continued to work the landscape. Judge Homer Nelson, the New York Secretary of State, bought the southern half of the property and renamed it Hudson Knolls. He lived elsewhere while a boardinghouse operated on the site. The northern half was purchased by local shoe manufacturer John Whitehouse, who merged it with his own adjoining property to the west of the site, retaining the Springside name. It passed to his son-in-law Eugene Howell upon his death, who kept up the landscape, at one point using it as a golf course, despite the failure of the shoe factory in 1891.

The gardener's cottage, since dismantled and removed.

In 1901, the property was reunified under the ownership of William Nelson Jr. (1829 - 1905), who had previously purchased the southern half when Judge Nelson (to whom he was not related) died in 1881, bought Howells' half following the shoe heir's bankruptcy. Nelson, who for the latter half of the 1800s, ran the Red Ball Line shipping company founded by his father, William Nelson Sr. in the 1820s, lived in the former boardinghouse with his family. He bequeathed it to his wife Marie Christiana Nelson (1860 - 1932), and she in turn passed it on to their children, Gerald, Geraldine, and Gertrude.

The two daughters and son kept the property in the family after Marie Christiana passed on, with the daughters, Geraldine and Gertrude, living out most of their lives there. Gertrude Nelson Fitzpatrick and her husband lived in the cottage, while her sister Geraldine Acker and her husband Earnest R. Acker built a house for themselves in 1929 on the site where Downing had intended for Springside's main house, calling the new house "Spring Gables".

=== Late 20th-century preservation ===
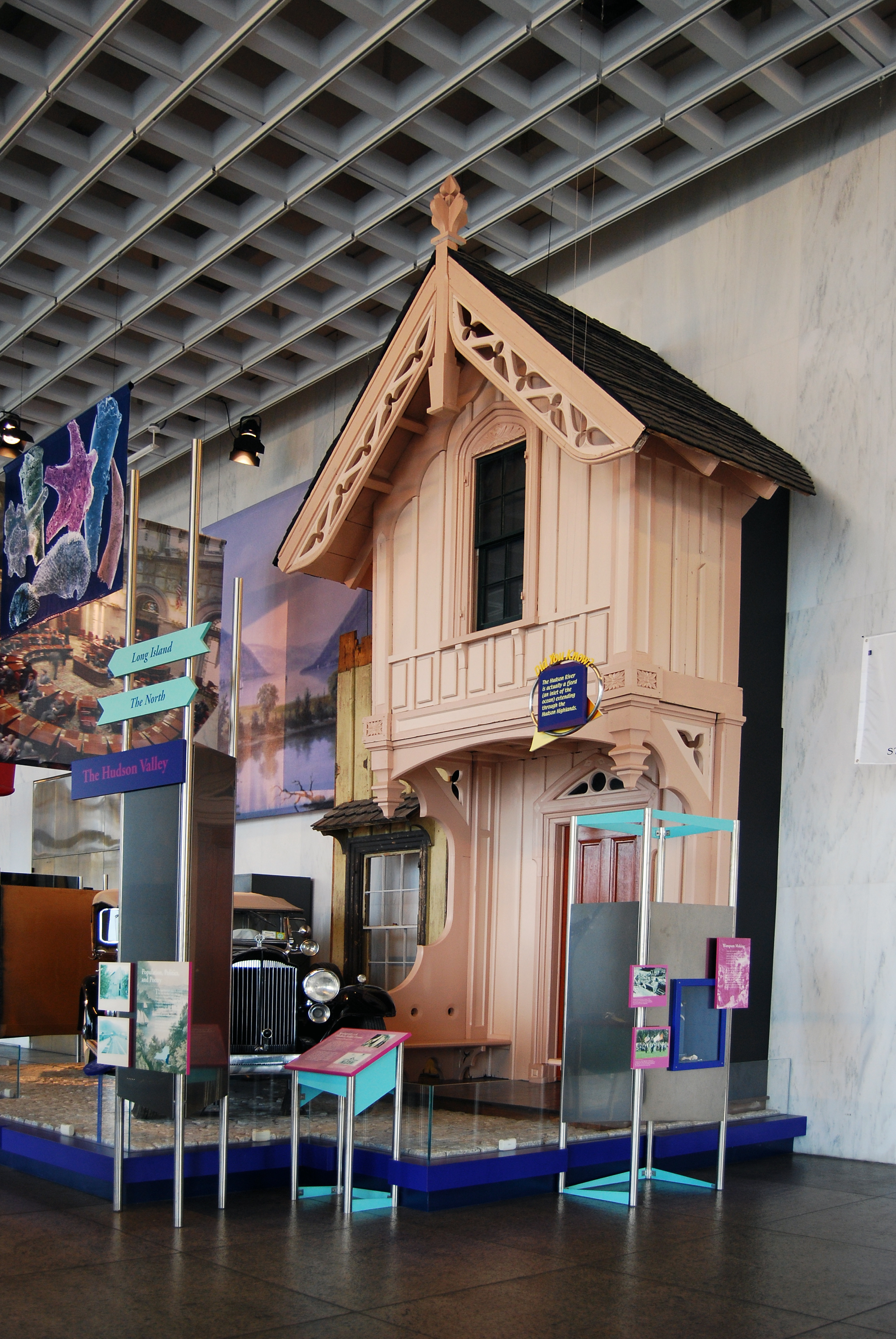
Facade at New York State Museum

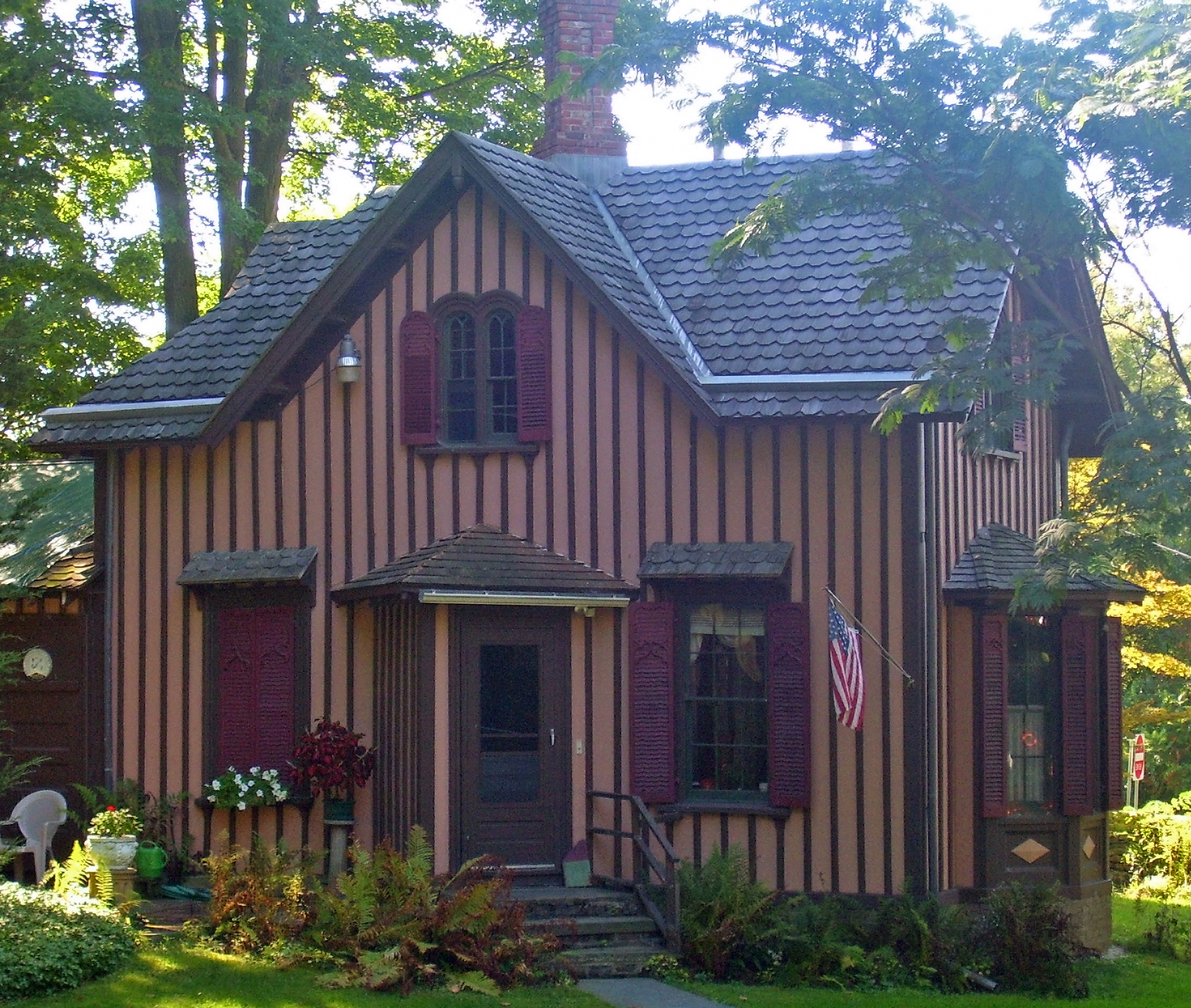
The gatehouse, restored to its original colors

The combination of private ownership and benign neglect had preserved much of Downing and Vassar's original design for a century. This situation would change as Poughkeepsie experienced rapid growth in the years after World War II.

In 1952 development pressure began when the Poughkeepsie City School District considered Springside as a site for a new high school. In the 1960s, historic preservation efforts started in response to increasing development in the area led to the estate being declared a National Historic Landmark (NHL) in 1969. The NHL designation could not protect the barn complex from being totally destroyed by arson later that month, and the other buildings suffered from continued decay and neglect. Development threats continued as the landowner, developer Robert Ackerman, persuaded the city to rezone the property to make it more amenable to the luxury apartment complex he planned to build. He pledged to protect the gatehouse and cottage, but the landscaping would have substantially altered Downing's original design.

The cottage facade was removed to an Albany warehouse by state order to preserve it in 1976; a quarter-century later it was put on display at the State Museum. Only the foundation clearing remains at the site. In 1982, a nearby condominium complex proposed nearby, and approved by the city, would have cleared most of Downing's remaining landscape. A lawsuit two years later alleging an insufficient environmental impact statement was settled in 1986 with the development of the farm portion of the property, close to Route 9 and the river, while the remaining landscape donated to a newly established non-profit organization, Springside Landscape Preservation, which continues to maintain the property. It took formal title to the land in 1990.

Today, only the Carpenter Gothic gatehouse, a building not found on the original plans, survives. It has been restored to its original colors and is still used as a private residence.

== Aesthetics ==
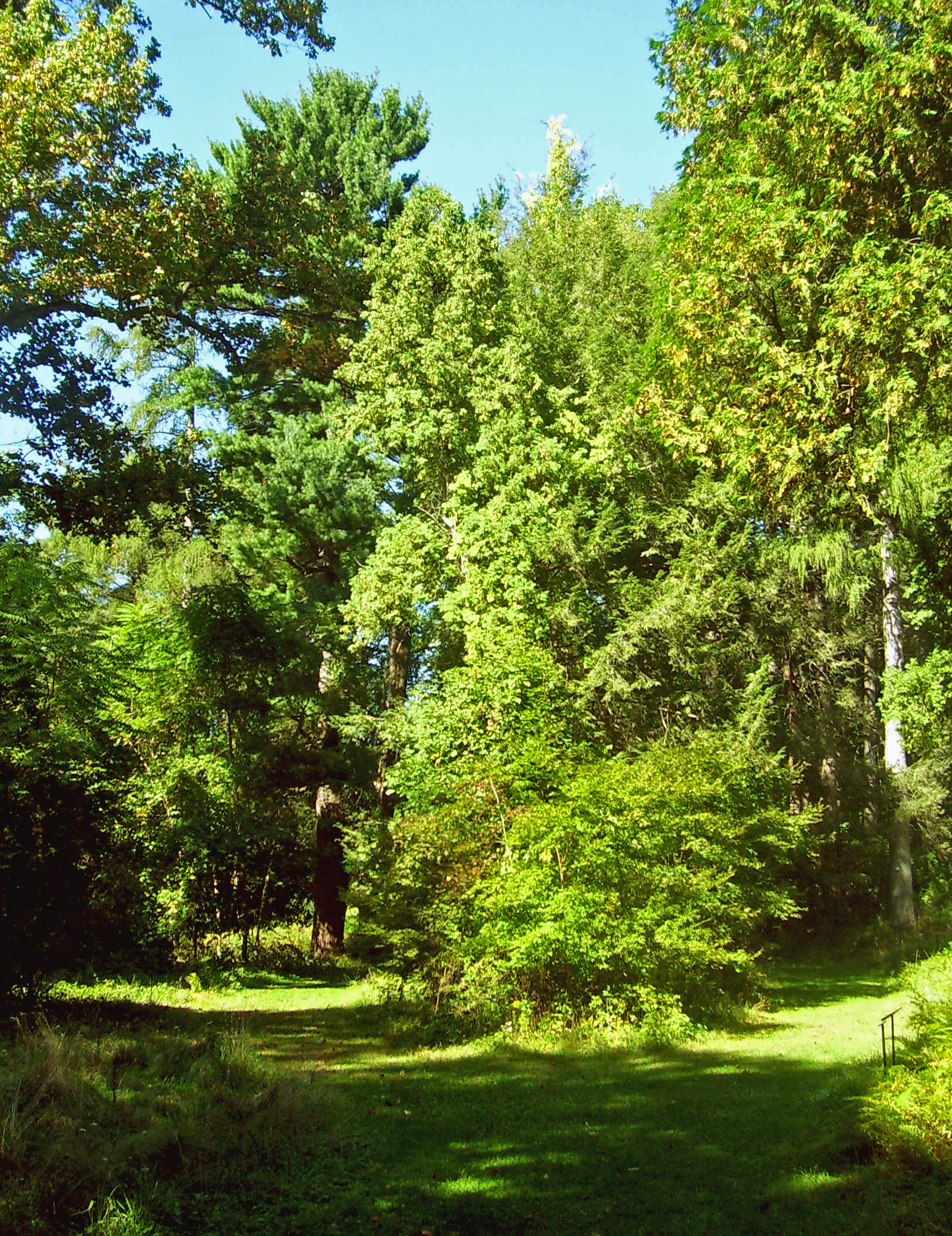
Landscape and curving pathway near cottage site

Downing had become a bestselling writer by expounding on his theories of combining what was beautiful in nature and art. The buildings at Springside, both planned and built, used consciously rustic board-and-batten siding, emphasized by some of the thousand trees he had transplanted from nearby forests. On the ground, the curving pathways follow the contours of the land beneath them and lead to scenic views, sometimes created by planting evergreens around rock outcrops

Statuary embellishments unite the buildings and grounds, and Downing took advantage of the property's natural drainage to create streams and fountains. Above the spring that gave the property its name, later itself named Willow Spring by Vassar, he placed a statue of a dog, since replaced by one of a young maiden. Ponds, too, were created, their irregular, natural shapes accentuated by similarly shaped islands. Many of these features that Downing pioneered were later replicated by Vaux and his fellow associate of Downing's, Frederick Law Olmsted, in their designs for Central Park and other major parks in American cities.

Today, with most of the buildings no longer extant on the site, the landscape still largely reflects Downing's original plan. Some secondary vegetation has grown in, but the pathways have been restored and many of the original trees remain.

== See also ==
- English Landscape Garden style
