= Church of the Holy Comforter (Brownsville, Minnesota) =

Historic church in Minnesota, United States

- Church of the Holy Comforter-Episcopal
- U.S. National Register of Historic Places
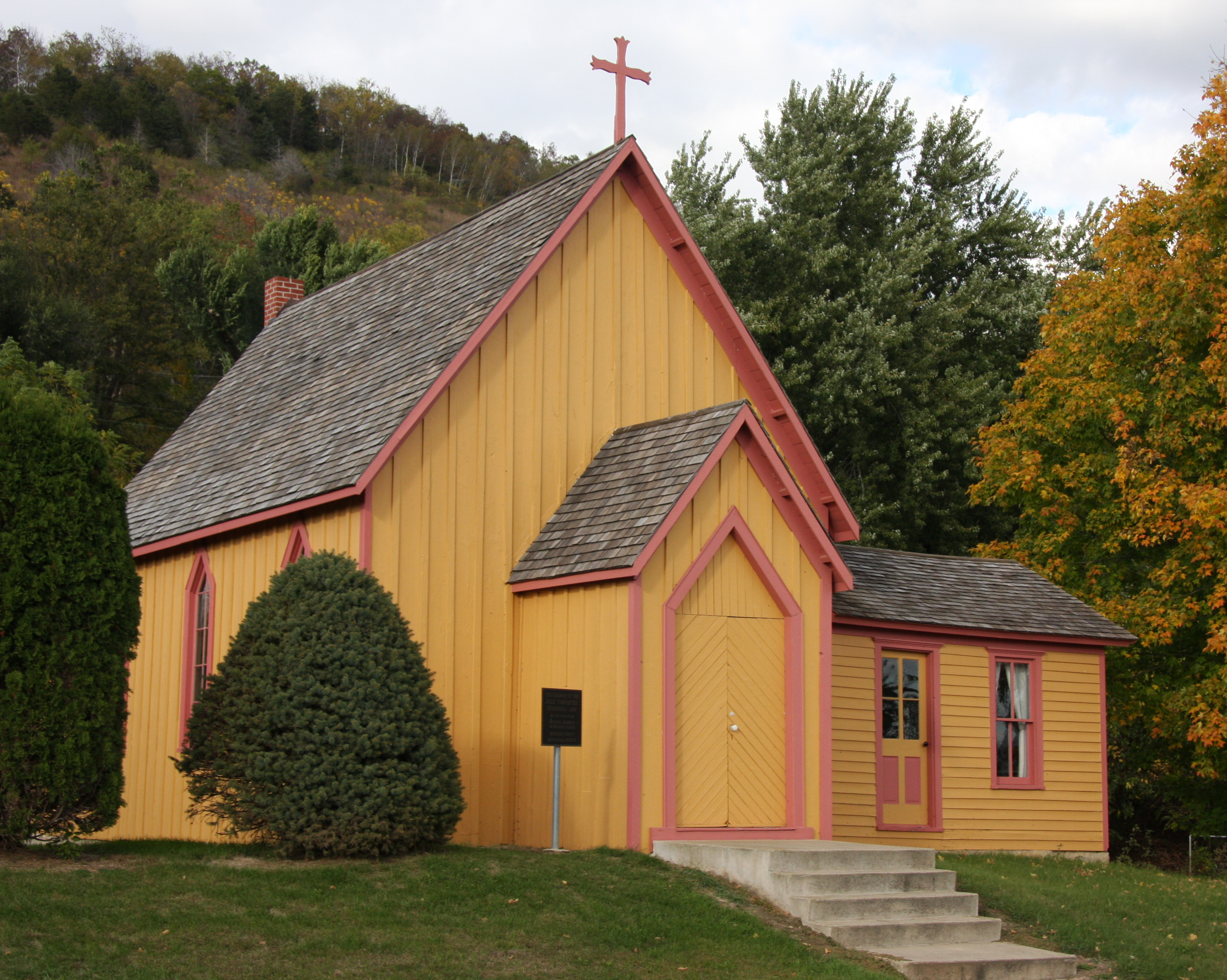

- Location within Minnesota Location within the United States
- Location: Main Street, Brownsville, Minnesota
- Coordinates: 43°41′40″N 91°16′37″W
- Built: 1869
- NRHP reference No.: 70000298
- Added to NRHP: June 2, 1970

The Church of the Holy Comforter, built in 1872, is a historic Carpenter Gothic church located on Main Street, in Brownsville, Minnesota, on the west bank of the Mississippi River in the United States. It began as an Episcopal church, but later became a Methodist Episcopal church. In the 1940s, it became Emmanuel Lutheran Church. It had been vacant since 1963. On June 2, 1970, the church was added to the National Register of Historic Places.

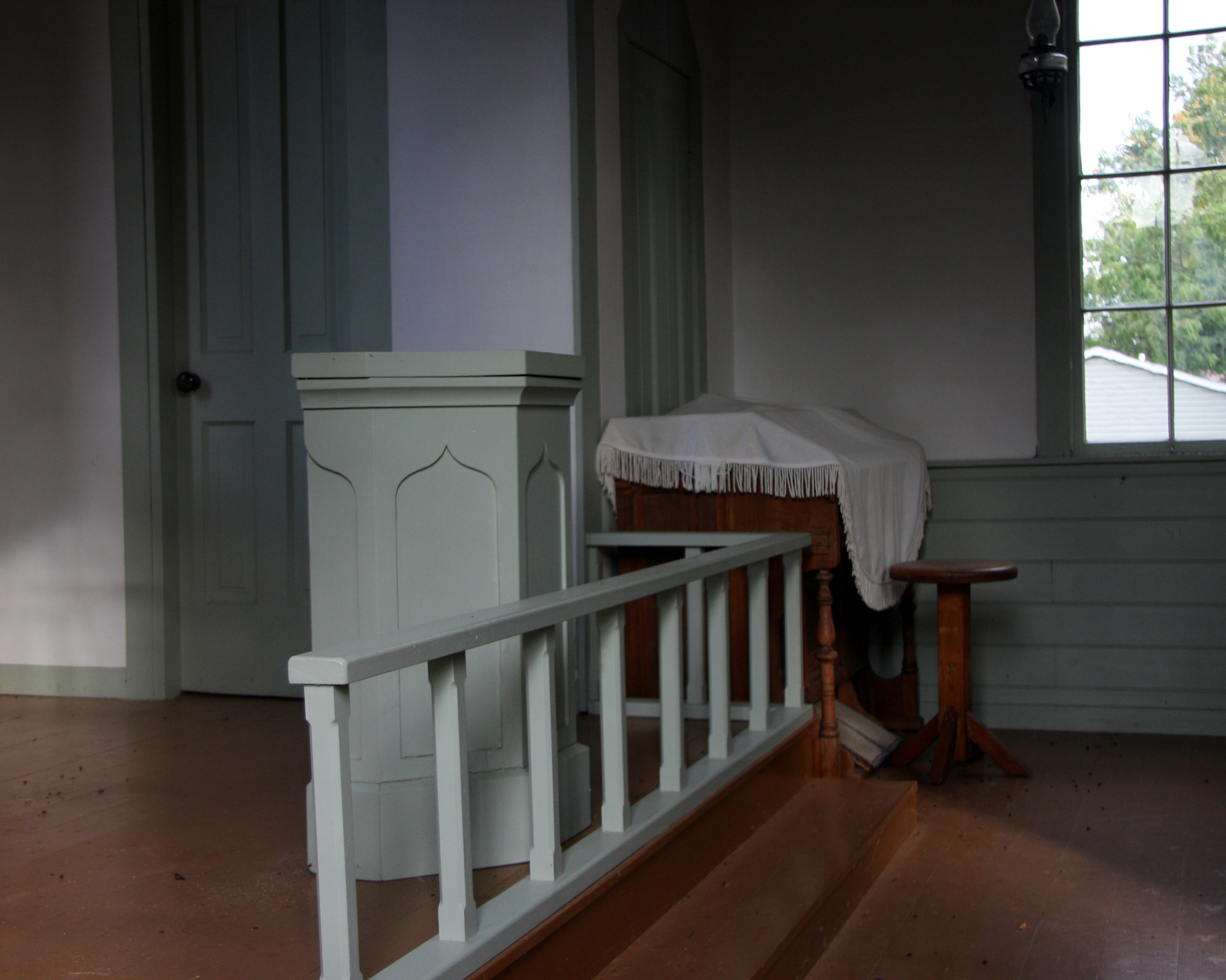
The interior of the church in 2013

== Current use ==
The church is not in use but is open by appointment only.

== See also ==
- List of Registered Historic Places in Minnesota
