= Matthew Vassar =

American merchant and philanthropist (1792–1868)

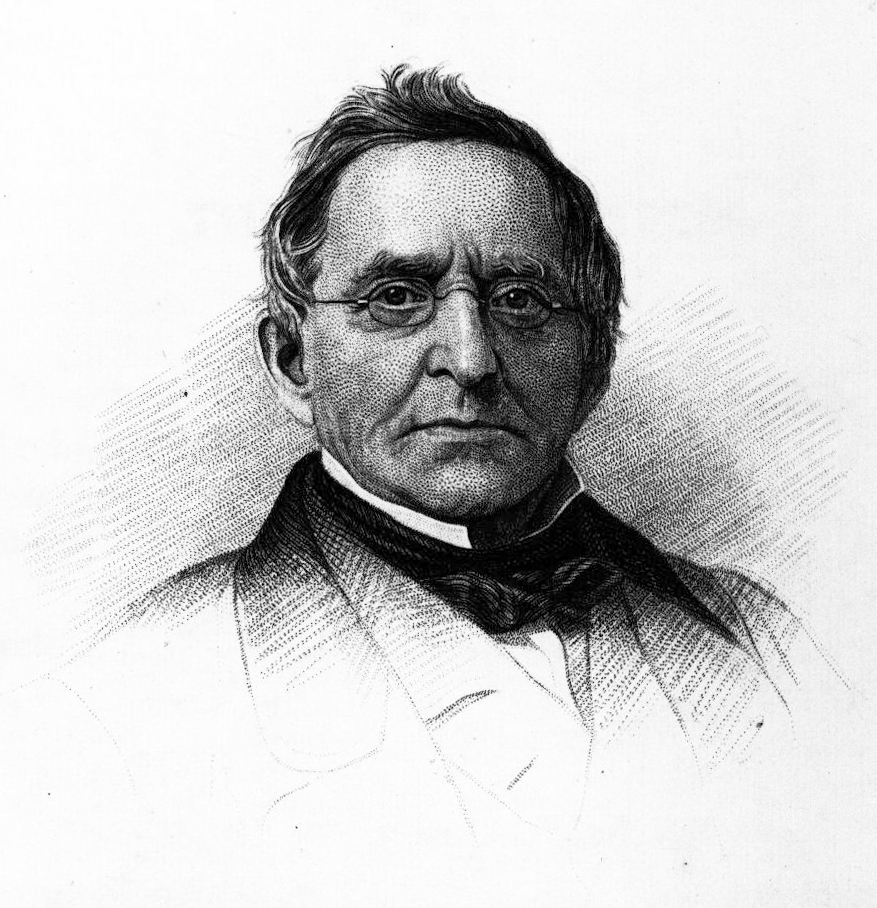
- From the Vassarion Eighteen Hundred & Ninety-Eight, Vassar College, 1898
- Born: April 29, 1792; East Dereham, Norfolk, England
- Died: June 23, 1868 (aged 76); Springside (Poughkeepsie, New York), U.S.
- Resting place: Poughkeepsie Rural Cemetery
- Occupations: Brewer, merchant, philanthropist
- Spouse: Catherine Valentine (m. 1813)

Matthew Vassar (April 29, 1792 – June 23, 1868) was an English-American brewer, merchant, and philanthropist. He founded Vassar College, a women’s college, in 1861. He was a cousin of John Ellison Vassar. The city of Vassar, Michigan, is named after him.

== Early life ==
Matthew Vassar was born on April 29, 1792, in East Dereham, Norfolk, England, to James and Ann Bennett Vassar, farmers of French Huguenot ancestry (Vasseur) who emigrated from England. In 1796, they arrived in New York State and settled on a farm along Wappinger's Creek on land that had been part of the 1685 Rombout Patent near Manchester Bridge in Dutchess County. While the farmhouse was being built, the family lived on the Filkintown Road, at what is now the intersection of Main and Church Streets. In 1801, James Vassar brewed ale with barley grown from seeds his brother Thomas brought from Norfolk. Demand for the ale was such that, in 1801, James Vassar sold the farm and bought a lot between Main and Mill Streets in the village of Poughkeepsie from Baltus Van Kleeck to build a brewery. When Vassar was 14 years old, his parents had him apprenticed to a tanner.

== Business career ==
In 1806, one day before he was to begin his apprenticeship, he ran away and crossing the Hudson River on the ferry at High Point made his way to Balm Town, just north of Newburgh, New York. There he found a job working in a store. He subsequently took a better-paying job with another local merchant before returning to Poughkeepsie in 1810, where he joined the family brewing business as bookkeeper and collector. By this time the family had most of the brewing trade in the river towns from Newburgh to Hudson. In 1811, a malt-dust explosion destroyed the family brewery on Vassar Street. His elder brother John died in the explosion, and his father was devastated by the loss. Matthew, then only 18, took over management of the business which was then conducted out of part of an old dye house belonging to George Booth, husband of Vassar's sister Maria. Booth, an immigrant from Yorkshire, England, was the first manufacturer of woolen cloth in Dutchess County.

During the War of 1812, Vassar joined the local fusilier's company as a sergeant, but saw little action. He spent his days at the brewery and his evenings working at an oyster saloon and restaurant he had opened in the basement of the county courthouse. In 1813, he married Catherine Valentine of Fishkill. In 1814, Vassar opened M. Vassar & Company and rebuilt the brewery on Vassar Street across the street from the family townhouse. At the time, it was the largest brewery of its kind in the United States. He served as a Poughkeepsie village trustee in 1819. He spent the winter of 1822 in New Orleans. In September 1824, he was among those welcoming the Marquis de Lafayette to Poughkeepsie on the occasion of the General's visit to the United States.

In 1831, Vassar took an active part in the incorporation of the Poughkeepsie Saving Bank and the following year became a shareholder in the Poughkeepsie Whaling Company, for which he built a large dock. In 1836, he built a larger brick brewery on the waterfront just above the Main Street Landing. The waterfront facility had a brewing capacity of 60,000 barrels annually. Both the malt and the hops were produced locally. M. Vassar & Co. owned a fleet of sloops to transport its ale to market. The company expanded to include two facilities in Poughkeepsie, one in New York City, and one in Lansingburgh, near Troy, New York. He brought John Guy Vassar and Matthew Vassar Jr., sons of his deceased brother John, into the business, who later founded Vassar Brothers Hospital in Poughkeepsie. In 1837, he took over the bankrupt brickyard of his brother Charles, which made bricks at what later came to be known as Brickyard Hill on the east side of town. He joined the board of the Farmers and Manufacturers National Bank and, in 1835, was elected president of the village of Poughkeepsie on the "Improvement" ticket.

In the 1850s, Vassar was president of the Poughkeepsie Lyceum of Literature, Science and the Mechanical Arts. He opened the 1852 season with the presentation of an address by Ralph Waldo Emerson. In 1851, John A. Bolding, a fugitive slave from South Carolina was working as a tailor on Main Street, when he was seized by a U.S. Marshall under the terms of the Fugitive Slave Act of 1850. When members of the Underground Railroad fell short of the amount necessary to buy Bolding's freedom, Matthew Vassar was among those who made up the difference.

Matthew Vassar died in his seventy-seventh year on June 23, 1868, while delivering his farewell address to the Vassar College Board of Trustees. His funeral was held in the Baptist Church on Lafayette Place. Vassar had donated the land and half the cost of erecting the church. He was buried in the Poughkeepsie Rural Cemetery.

== Legacy ==
=== Springside ===
Springside was the estate of Matthew Vassar, located just off US 9 on Academy Street in Poughkeepsie. It lay across the road from "Woodside", the estate of retired manufacturer G.C. Burnap. Andrew Jackson Downing designed the grounds, and with Calvert Vaux, the main house, which was never built. Springside was designated a National Historic Landmark in 1969 and is listed on the National Register of Historic Places (NRHP).

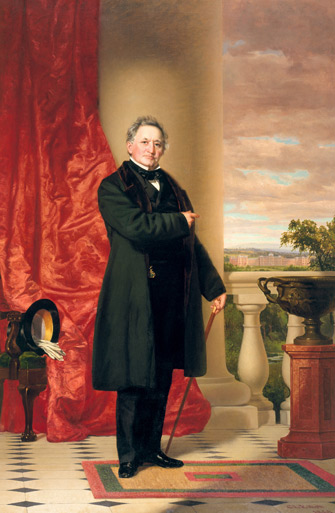
An 1861 portrait of Vassar, with his namesake college's Main Building in the background

=== Vassar, Michigan ===
Vassar, Michigan, was founded on the Cass River in 1849 by James M. Edmunds. Its main industry was lumbering. Edmunds was a nephew of Matthew Vassar. Edmunds named the settlement after his uncle, who put up the seed money for the project.

=== Vassar College ===
Vassar's niece, Lydia Booth, a teacher who ran the "Cottage Hill Seminary" out of a building Vassar owned on Garden Street, encouraged him to establish a women's college in Poughkeepsie. In January 1861, the New York Legislature passed an act to incorporate Vassar College, one of the first women's colleges in the U.S. On 26 February 1861, at the Hotel Gregory in Poughkeepsie, Matthew Vassar presented the college's Board of Trustees with a tin box containing half of his fortune, $408,000 (approximately $9,700,000 in 2008 dollars) and a deed of conveyance for 200 acres (0.81 km^{2}) of land to establish the campus. In 1864, Vassar purchased the art collection of Elias Lyman Magoon, a noted collector of Hudson River School paintings. Vassar's diary entry for June 16, 1865 states, "Sick and tired of College business, no one to help me Except "Scow", Doct Raymond and Swan." In a bill enacted on 15 July 1870, the U.S. Congress waived any tax claim(s) to the donation to the college.

=== USS Matthew Vassar ===
The USS Matthew Vassar was a wooden centerboard schooner. It was purchased by the U.S. Navy in New York in September 1861 and commissioned in January 1862. The ship was assigned to a Mortar Flotilla guarding the approaches to New Orleans. In November 1864, it was assigned to the East Coast Blockading Squadron. After the war the ship was decommissioned and sold at auction.

=== Vassar Home for Aged Men ===
In 1880, Matthew Vassar's nephews, John Guy Vassar and Matthew Vassar Jr., converted the site of their uncle's mansion at 9 Vassar Street into the Vassar Home for Aged Men. It remained a senior citizen's home through much of the 20th century. The Vassar Home was added to the NRHP in 1972.

=== Vassar Institute ===
In 1882, Vassar's nephews converted the site of the old brewery at 12 Vassar Street into the Vassar Institute. The first floor contained a natural history museum and the second a library, as well as offices for the Poughkeepsie Literary Society and Poughkeepsie Society of Natural Sciences. Vassar Institute was added to the NRHP in 1972.

=== Vassar Hospital ===
Vassar Brothers Hospital was endowed by John Guy Vassar and Matthew Vassar Jr., sons of Mathew Vassar's deceased elder brother, whom he helped to prosperity by bringing them into his thriving brewing business.

== Sources ==
- Gregg Smith, Beer in America: The Early Years—1587-1840 (Boulder, CO: Siris Books, 1998)
