= Church of the Holy Comforter (Poughkeepsie, New York) =

Historic church in New York, United States

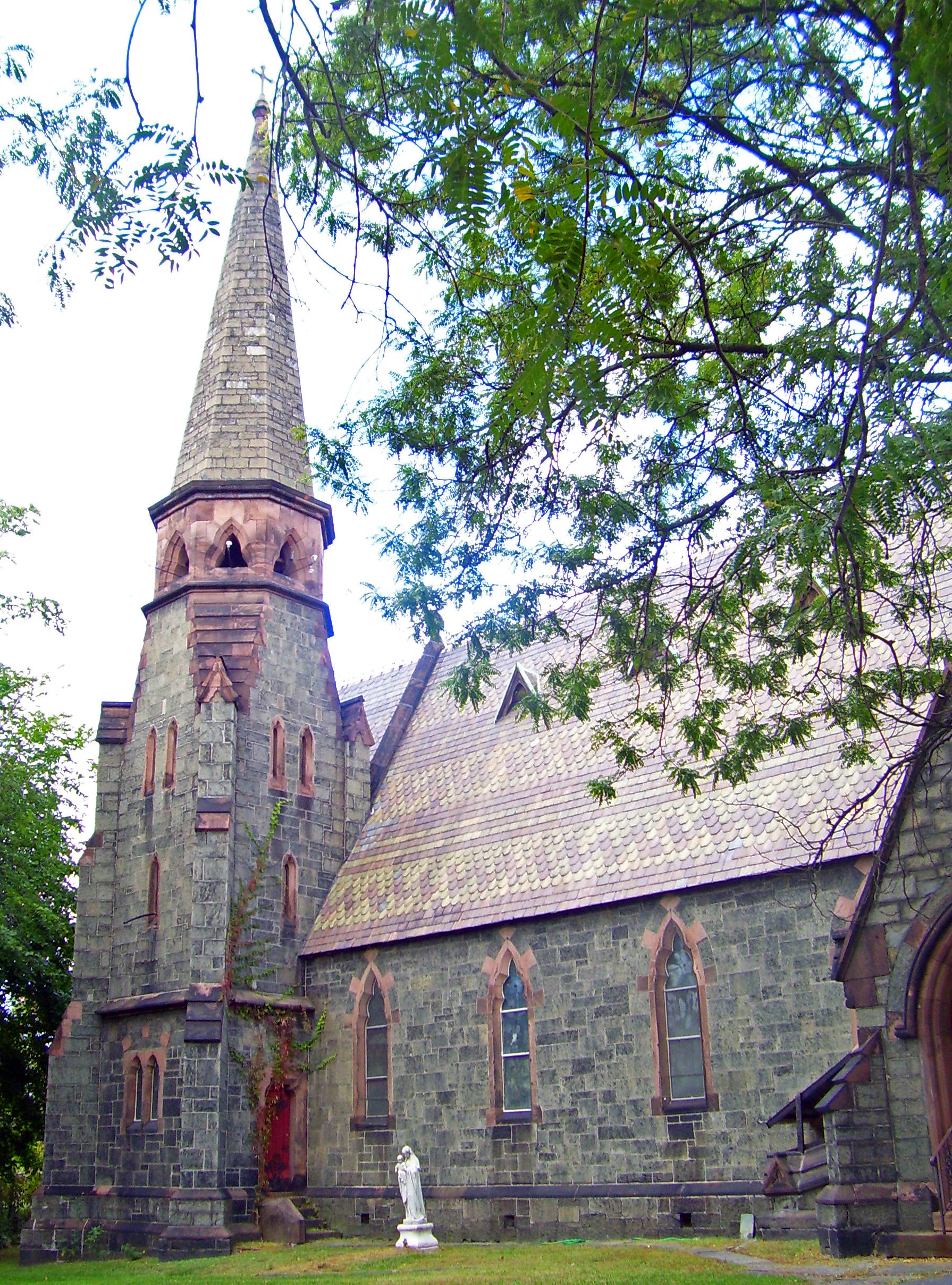
- South elevation and tower, 2007

Religion
- Affiliation: The Archdiocese of New York (The Holy Orthodox Catholic and Apostolic Church of America
- Rite: Western Rite Orthodox
- Year consecrated: 1860

Location
- Location: Poughkeepsie, NY, USA
- Interactive map of Church of the Holy Comforter
- Coordinates: 41°22′23″N 73°56′11″W

Architecture
- Architect: Richard Upjohn
- Style: Gothic Revival
- General contractor: William Harloe
- Groundbreaking: 1859
- Completed: 1860
- Construction cost: $19,000 (church, 1860) $8,700 (north addition, 1867)

Specifications
- Direction of façade: East
- Capacity: 300
- Spire height: 100'
- Materials: Ulster County bluestone trimmed with New Jersey brownstone

U.S. National Register of Historic Places
- Added to NRHP: April 13, 1972
- NRHP Reference no.: 72000831

The Church of the Holy Comforter, built in 1860, is a Gothic Revival church located at 18 Davies Place, near the train station in Poughkeepsie, New York, United States, a few blocks from the Hudson River. Its steeple is prominently visible to traffic passing through the city since the construction of the elevated US 9 expressway in 1965.

The congregation first formed in 1854 as Christ Church. Six years later, it had incorporated and hired Richard Upjohn, a prominent architect noted for his churches, to design a building. His original plans are on file at Columbia University's Avery Library. The cornerstone—located at the southwest buttress of the tower—was laid on June 14, 1859 and the church was consecrated by Bishop Horatio Potter on October 25, 1860. Holy Comforter is a Gothic-Revival structure with walls of local Ulster County bluestone from across the river and trim of New Jersey brownstone. Inside, the original pews are still in place and the vaulted ceiling is supported with wooden ribs. An addition to the north was built in 1867 with funds provided by William Augustus Davies in memory of his late wife, Sarah Van Wagenen.

On April 13, 1972, it was added to the National Register of Historic Places. It is also a contributing property to the Mill Street-North Clover Street Historic District listed on the Register later that year.

Today the church is in the Archdiocese of New York of the Holy Orthodox Catholic and Apostolic Church of America and is no longer affiliated with the Episcopal Church. Its break with the Episcopal Church grew out of disagreements and events in the 1970s. It was later affiliated with another Anglican denomination and recently became affiliated with the Holy Orthodox Catholic and Apostolic Church of America.

== See also ==
- National Register of Historic Places listings in Poughkeepsie, New York
