= O. H. Booth Hose Company =

Fire station in Poughkeepsie, New York

- U.S. National Register of Historic Places
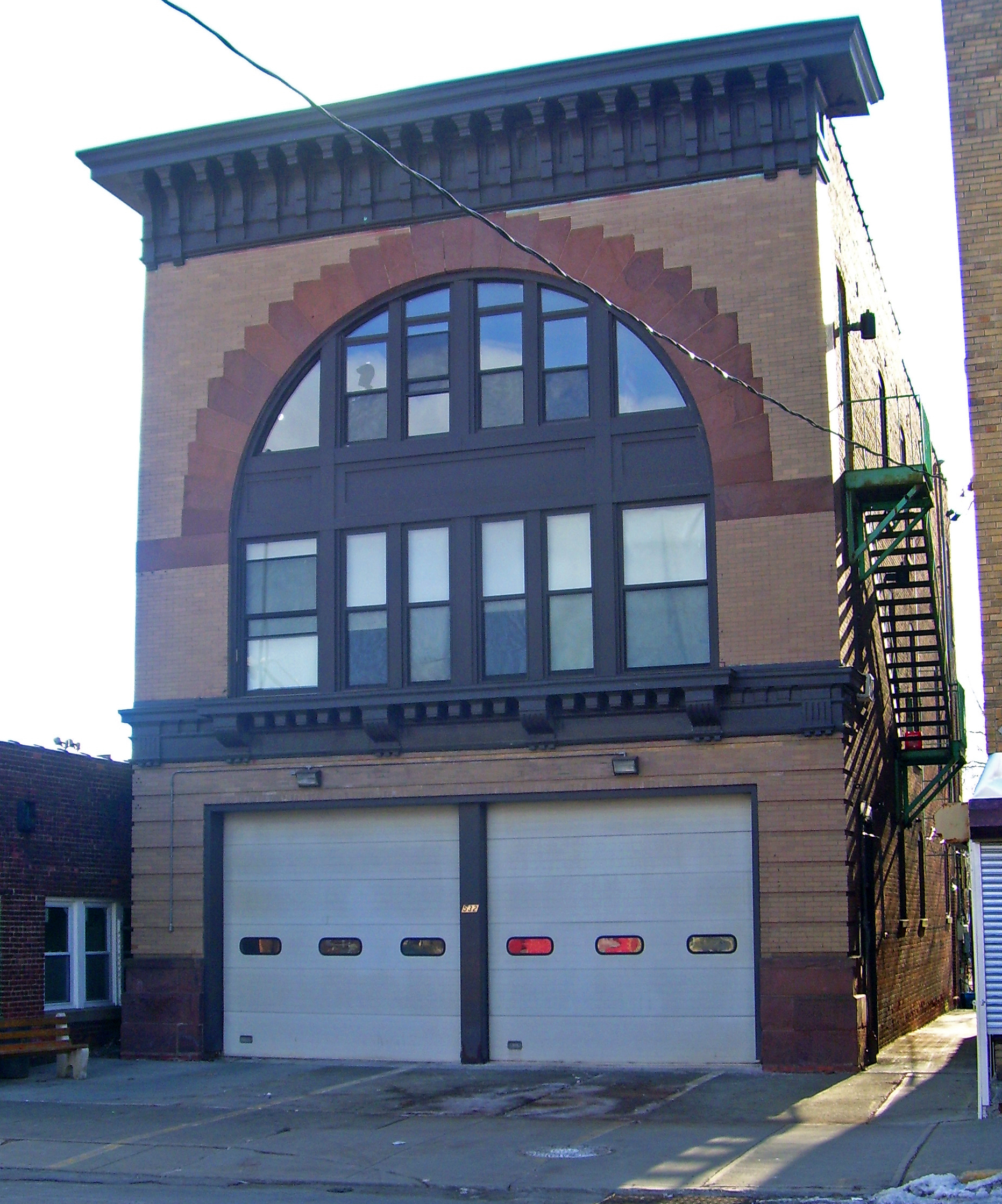
- Front elevation in 2008

- Location within New York Location within the United States
- Location: 532 Main St., Poughkeepsie, New York
- Coordinates: 41°42′4″N 73°55′4″W
- Area: less than one acre
- Built: 1908
- Architect: Beardsley, William J.
- MPS: Poughkeepsie MRA
- NRHP reference No.: 82001123
- Added to NRHP: November 26, 1982

The O.H. Booth Hose Company is a former firehouse along Main Street in Poughkeepsie, New York, United States. It was in use for roughly a century, from the late 1910s to the mid-2000s, when the city's police and fire departments consolidated their operations in a new building across the street. A local firefighters' group has proposed turning it into a local fire museum.

It is a three-story brick building with three bays, which could house two fire engines during its active days. The second and third stories have a distinctive arched window, a feature not normally seen in firehouses of the time.

The fire company was established in the mid-19th century, from a predecessor company, the Howard Hose Co. No. 2. Its members were jealous over the new facilities of two rival fire companies, and enough of them resigned that it was disbanded. Oliver H. Booth, the chief, organized the new company and it was named in his honor.

Around 1908, the company needed a new house on Main Street. Local architect William J. Beardsley, who had recently designed the new Dutchess County Court House, was hired. His building was plainer than other firehouses in the city, but came with an upper story meant to be used as a club. One of his original renderings of the building is on the wall. In 1982, the building was added to the National Register of Historic Places, one of three firehouses in the city to be so recognized (the other two are the Lady Washington Hose Company and the Niagara Engine House).

In 2008 the Exempt Fireman's Association (Exempts), a fraternal local volunteer firefighters' group founded by Booth in 1886, proposed that the building be reused as a firefighting museum and fire safety education center, due to what its members feel is a lack of awareness of the latter among the city's residents. The city said it was willing to discuss the proposal but only after the fire department had fully vacated the building. According to the head of the city firefighters' union, the building is in serious disrepair and will require substantial renovations. The head of the Exempts says his group has the manpower to do the job and could apply for state and federal grants.

== See also ==
- National Register of Historic Places listings in Poughkeepsie, New York
