= Thorne Memorial School =

- U.S. National Register of Historic Places
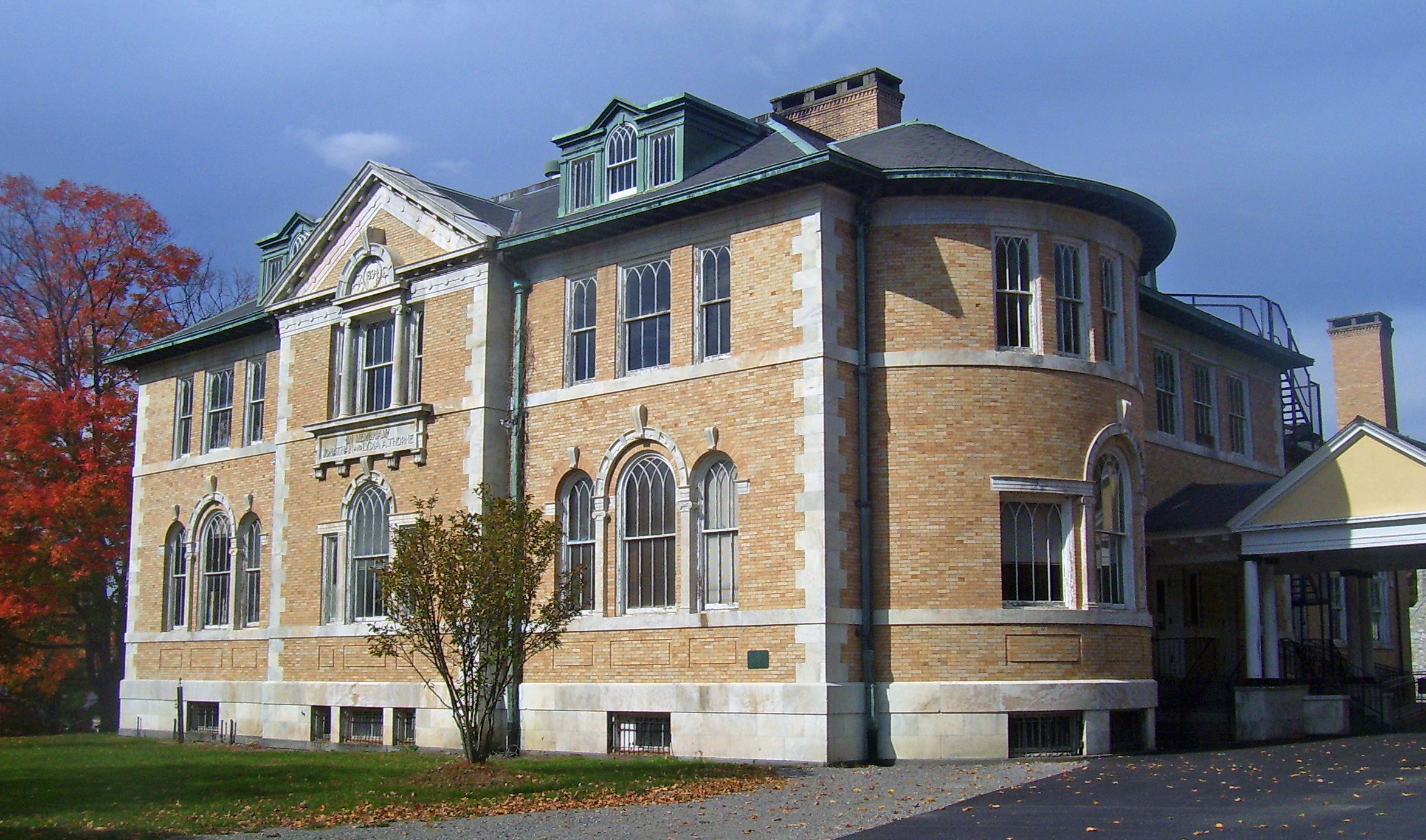
- South elevation and east profile, 2008
- Location: Millbrook, NY
- Nearest city: Poughkeepsie
- Coordinates: 41°47′9″N 73°41′24″W
- Area: 3.5 acres (1.4 ha)
- Built: 1895
- Architect: William J. Beardsley
- Architectural style: Beaux-Arts
- NRHP reference No.: 96001473
- Added to NRHP: 1996

The Thorne Memorial School building is located at Franklin and Maple streets in Millbrook, New York, United States. It is a brick structure built at the end of the 19th century, considered the most distinctive public building in the village.

After being challenged by a newspaper reporter's column about the new village's lack of a school, a wealthy local resident had the school built at his expense and donated it to the community. In order for it to be accepted, it was necessary for the village to formally incorporate. It served as its high school until 1962. Today it is used for special purposes and afterschool activities. In 1996 it was listed on the National Register of Historic Places along with an adjacent blacksmith's shop.

== Buildings and grounds ==
The school's 3.5-acre (1.4 ha) lot is a rectangular parcel located in a residential area at the corner of Franklin (the former route of the US 44 highway) and Maple avenues on the eastern edge of downtown Millbrook. To the north is Lyall Federated Church and some houses; to the east is Maple Avenue East. An access drive in the center divides the developed portion on the west from a grassy field on the east. The school has its original retaining wall on the south side and a parking lot on the north.

The main building is a three-story structure on a limestone foundation sided in buff brick. It is configured as two connecting perpendicular blocks, with semicircular wings on the south corners. Asphalt has covered the original metal roof, except for the copper trim on the cornice and dormer windows.

The front (south) facade is trimmed with limestone quoins, beltcourses and architraves. It is pedimented in the center over a Palladian window. Windows are round-arched on the ground floor.

Inside the front block is given over to classrooms surrounding an open stairwell on the first two stories. The third story, originally living quarters for the janitor and his family has smaller rooms in the dormers with a central hall lit by skylights. Walls are plaster over clay tile on the interior wythe; floors are original wood strip except for concrete in the basement, which is used for mechanical purposes.

It connects to the similar basement of the north wing. That wing's ground floor has a kitchen on the east and cafeteria on the west. To their north is a two-story auditorium with exposed iron trusses supporting the ceiling and roof. At the north end are dressing rooms and mechanical rooms.

There are two outbuildings associated with the property. A cobblestone shop near the school was originally used to teach students blacksmithing; it is today a storage facility. It dates to sometime before 1913 and is considered a contributing resource. A bandshell on the north end of the field to the east is of more modern construction and thus non-contributing.

== History ==
Millbrook had come into existence in 1869, when entrepreneur M. Franklin Merritt bought an old farm through which the Dutchess and Columbia Railroad was slated to be built. He laid out streets and subdivided the land. The village-to-be was named Millbrook, in honor of the nearby estate of G.H. Brown.

The settlement grew quickly, with other wealthy buyers establishing their own country estates outside of town. Those who worked for or sold things to them moved into the growing hamlet. In 1892, a local newspaper, the Round Table, reported the observations of a visitor from Poughkeepsie on what the village, which he praised for its "evident harmony and cooperation between the millionaire population and the unmoneyed people", lacked:

You have fine roads, fine stores, fine churches and no school house! This is un-American. Where the church points to heaven, the schoolhouse tower should guard the earthly estate. These twins of good society should never be separated.

The visitor called for one of the wealthy local residents to rise to the occasion and endow a public school in Millbrook, "a monument that outlasts time".

The next year a meeting was called to consider that possibility. A site was initially selected near the old wooden schoolhouse on Elm Street, built shortly after the hamlet was subdivided. In the autumn of that year Samuel Thorne, a wealthy resident with deep roots in the area, announced that plans were nearly complete for the present school, on a different parcel of land. He would name it Thorne Memorial for his late parents Jonathan and Lydia.

Thorne's school was to be state-of-the-art for its era. The new school was fireproof, long before this became common or mandatory. The Round Table said the new school had the potential to make Millbrook "first in educational advantages among villages of its size in Dutchess County".

No hard documentation exists for the architect or builders, but recent investigation has found that they were likely William J. Beardsley and the Cornwall firm of Mead and Taft respectively. Christopher Gray has found that Beardsley, who established himself later with the 1903 Dutchess County Court House in Poughkeepsie and went on to design many public buildings in the state, lived on the same Millbrook street as Frank Welling, supervisor of the construction for the school board. His 1933 obituary also referred to "a school in Millbrook" as being one of his works. Mead and Taft had recently built nearby Halcyon Hall and were known for their ability to finish such large projects.

It was completed and opened in September 1895. The Thorne family wanted to donate it to the community, but at the time there was no formal entity that could accept the gift. So, at the end of the year, Millbrook voted overwhelmingly to incorporate as a village.

The original school property included a stable and blacksmith shop as outbuildings. The former is no longer extant; the latter is but is used for storage. The school continued to be used as the village's high school until the creation of the present Millbrook Central School District in 1962. There have been very few alterations to it save for the removal of the original flagpole and cupola. It continues to be used for special-interest classes and community event until recently when the Millbrook Board of Trustees decided that the cost of keeping the building open was too great for amount of use.

== See also ==
- National Register of Historic Places listings in Dutchess County, New York
