= Percival Lloyd =

American architect

- Born: January 28, 1872; Poughkeepsie, New York
- Died: March 6, 1915 (aged 43); Saranac Lake, New York
- Occupation: Architect

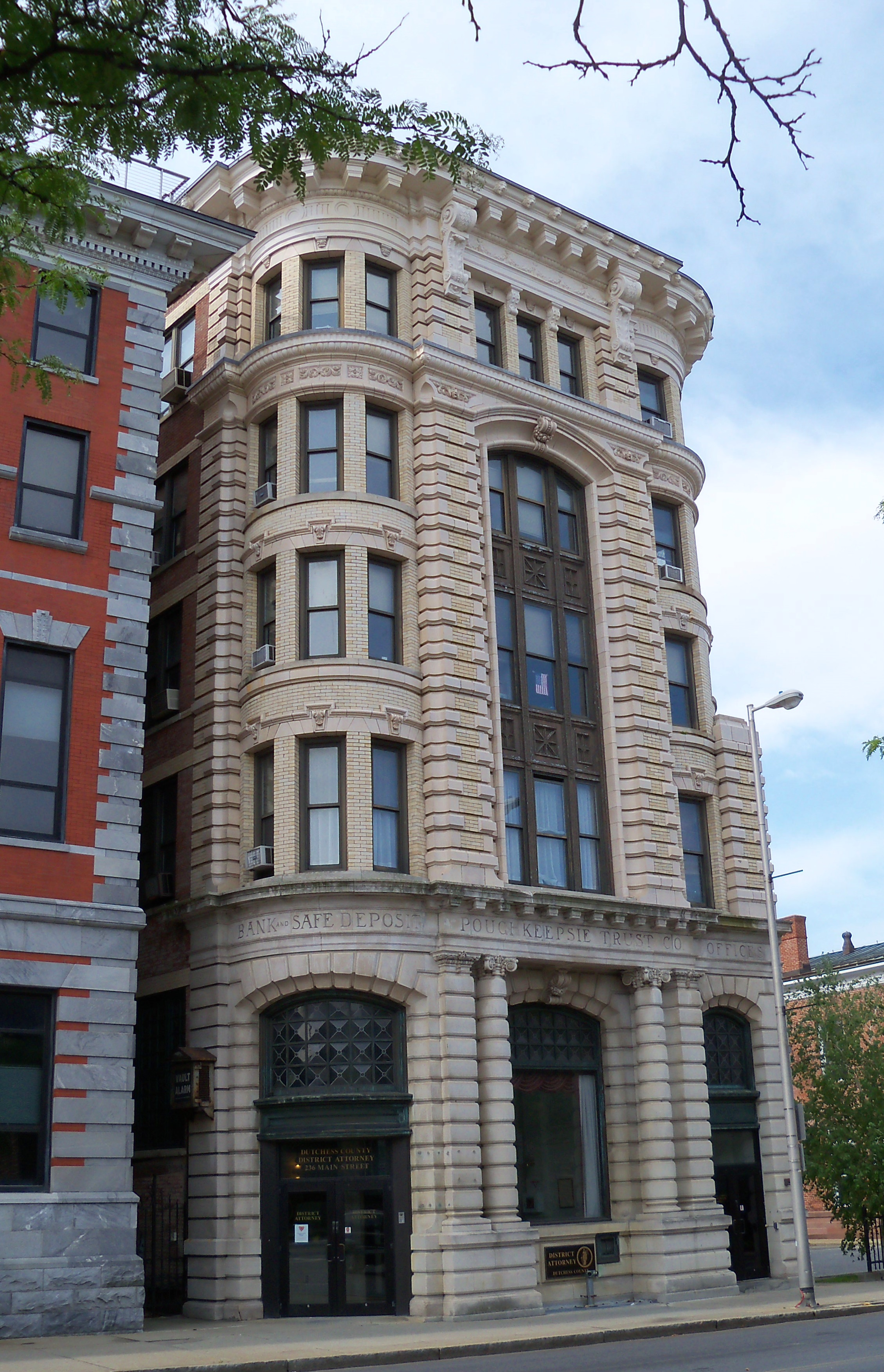
The Poughkeepsie Trust Company Building, built in 1906.

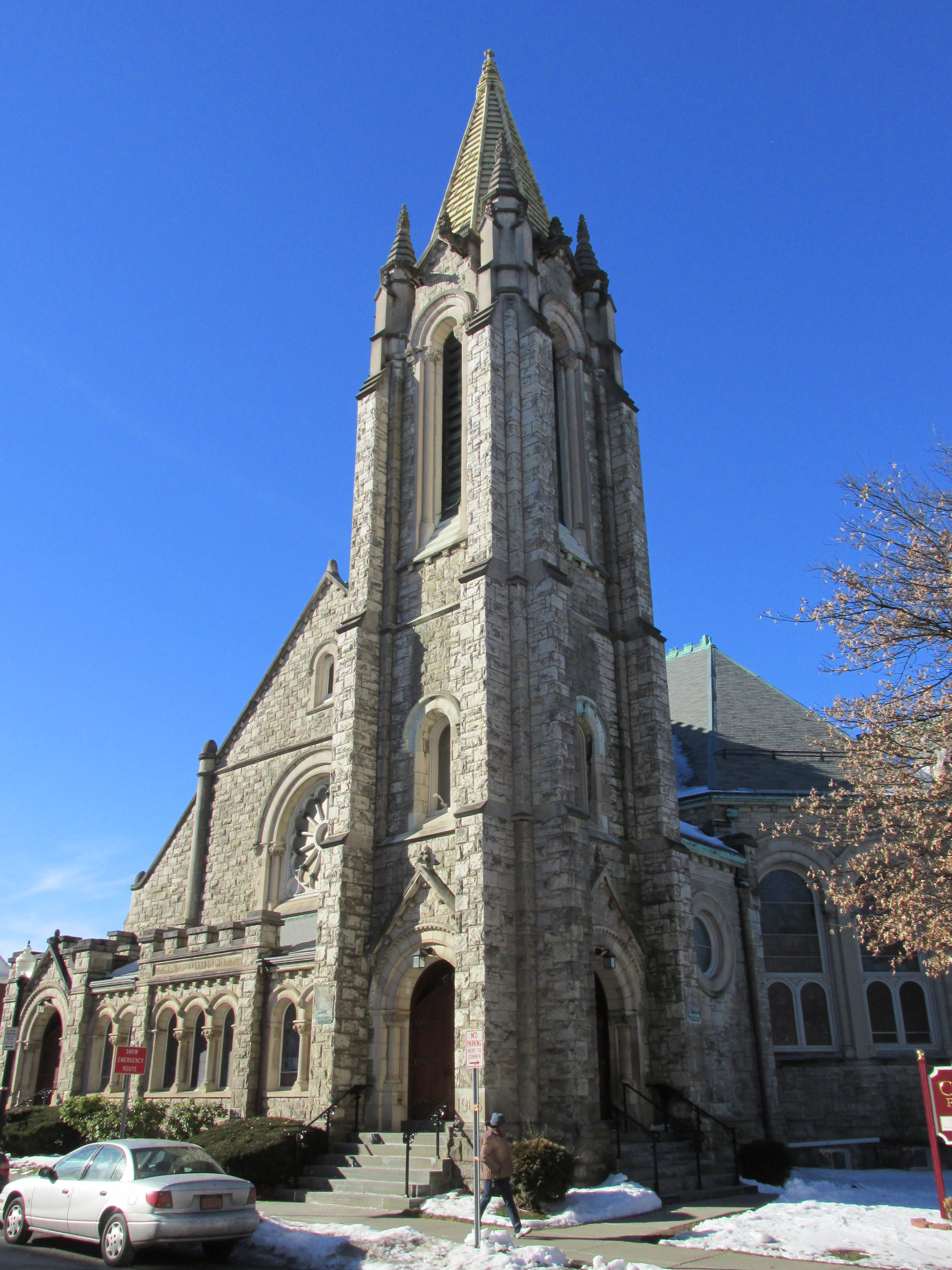
The First Presbyterian Church of Poughkeepsie, completed in 1908.

Percival Lloyd (1872–1915) was an American architect in practice in Poughkeepsie, New York, from 1895 until 1915. A number of his works are listed on the United States National Register of Historic Places.

== Life and career ==
Percival Monell Lloyd was born January 28, 1872, in Poughkeepsie to Russell G. Lloyd and Florence (Monell) Lloyd. He was educated in the local public schools and at the Riverview Military Academy. In 1894 he joined the office of leading local architect Arnout Cannon Jr., and became his business partner in the firm of Cannon & Lloyd in 1895. Cannon's declining health led him to commit suicide in 1898, and Lloyd continued the business alone. Lloyd practiced independently until late 1914, when due to his own declining health he took a leave of absence from his office and entered a sanatorium in Saranac Lake, where he died March 6, 1915. He never married.

Lloyd was a member of the New York Society of Architects, established in 1906, and was elected to the board of directors in 1914.

== Legacy ==
According to its National Register nomination, the First Presbyterian Church in Poughkeepsie is "perceived as 'beautiful'", and is regarded as one of Lloyd's greatest works. "It is indeed an imposing and unique structure in Poughkeepsie". His Poughkeepsie Trust Company Building is a Beaux Arts building that was the Hudson Valley's first modern skyscraper at six stories in height, costing $100,000 to build.

The regional architects Edward C. Smith of Poughkeepsie and George E. Lowe of Kingston both worked in Lloyd's office.

== Architectural works ==
- House, (Note: A contributing property to the Balding Avenue Historic District, NRHP-listed in 1982.) 32 Balding Ave, Poughkeepsie, New York (1896)
- House, (Note: A contributing property to the Academy Street Historic District, NRHP-listed in 1982.) 151 Academy St, Poughkeepsie, New York (1901)
- First Presbyterian Church, 25 S Hamilton St, Poughkeepsie, New York (1905–08, NRHP 1982)
- Poughkeepsie Trust Company Building, 236 Main St, Poughkeepsie, New York (1906, NRHP 1982)
- Poughkeepsie YWCA, Cannon St, Poughkeepsie, New York (1906, demolished)
- House, (Note: A contributing property to the Dwight–Hooker Avenue Historic District, NRHP-listed in 1982.) 81 Hooker Ave, Poughkeepsie, New York (1907)
- Lady Washington Hose Company building, 20 Academy St, Poughkeepsie, New York (1908, NRHP 1982)
- FIAT assembly plant, North Rd and Fulton St, Poughkeepsie, New York (1909, demolished)
- Niagara Engine House, 8 N Hamilton St, Poughkeepsie, New York (1909, NRHP 1982)
- Luckey, Platt & Company Department Store annex, 332 Main St, Poughkeepsie, New York (1910, NRHP 1982)
- House, 9 Dwight St, Poughkeepsie, New York (1911)
- Clarence Kenyon house, 260 Boardman Rd, Poughkeepsie, New York (1913)
- Mader House, 101 Corlies Ave, Poughkeepsie, New York (before 1925, attributed, NRHP 1982)
