= First Presbyterian Church (Poughkeepsie, New York) =

Historic church in New York, United States

- U.S. National Register of Historic Places
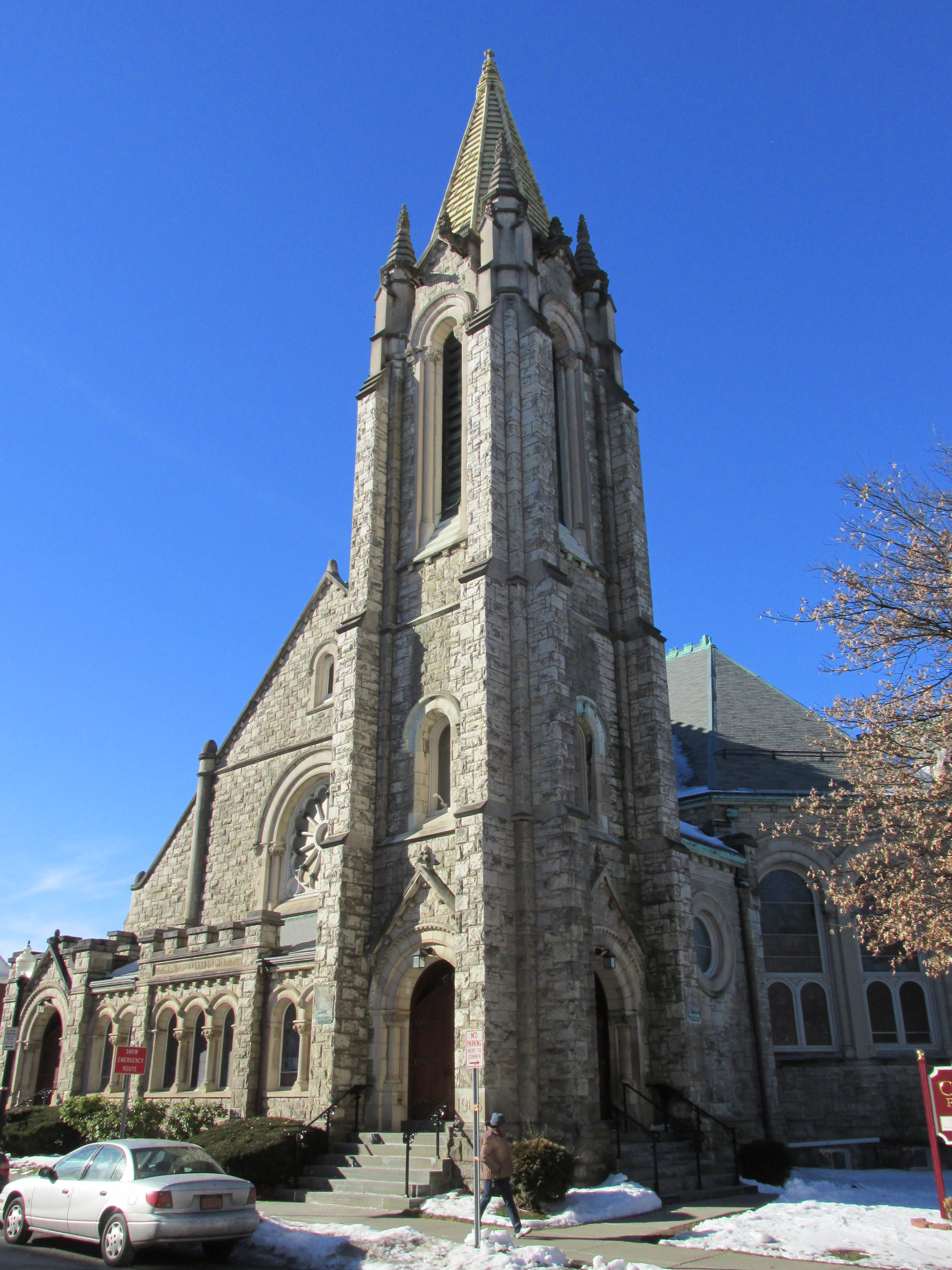
- First Presbyterian Church

- Location within New York Location within the United States
- Location: 25 S. Hamilton St., Poughkeepsie, New York
- Coordinates: 41°42′4″N 73°55′29″W
- Area: less than one acre
- Built: 1905
- Architect: Percival M. Lloyd
- Architectural style: Romanesque
- MPS: Poughkeepsie MRA
- NRHP reference No.: 82001136
- Added to NRHP: November 26, 1982

First Presbyterian Church is a historic Presbyterian church located at Poughkeepsie, Dutchess County, New York. It was built in 1905 and is a large, five-sided stone building with a wing. It features a three-story square tower with a pyramidal roof and arched Romanesque window surrounds.

It was added to the National Register of Historic Places in 1982. The related manse was added at the same time.

== History ==
The First Presbyterian Church in Poughkeepsie, New York was organized in 1749. Services were conducted first in connection with Fishkill and afterwards in connection with the Charlotte Precinct, which included Washington Hollow and Pleasant Valley.

In September 1826, the North River Presbytery re-organized the church with eighteen members and installed Rev. Alonso Welton as pastor. The congregation first worshiped in an old frame building on Church Street, before moving to Cannon Street in December 1826.

Reverend Thomas Woodrow, maternal grandfather of President Woodrow Wilson, preached in Poughkeepsie after emigrating from Scotland in 1835.
