= Mader House =

Historic house in New York, United States

- U.S. National Register of Historic Places
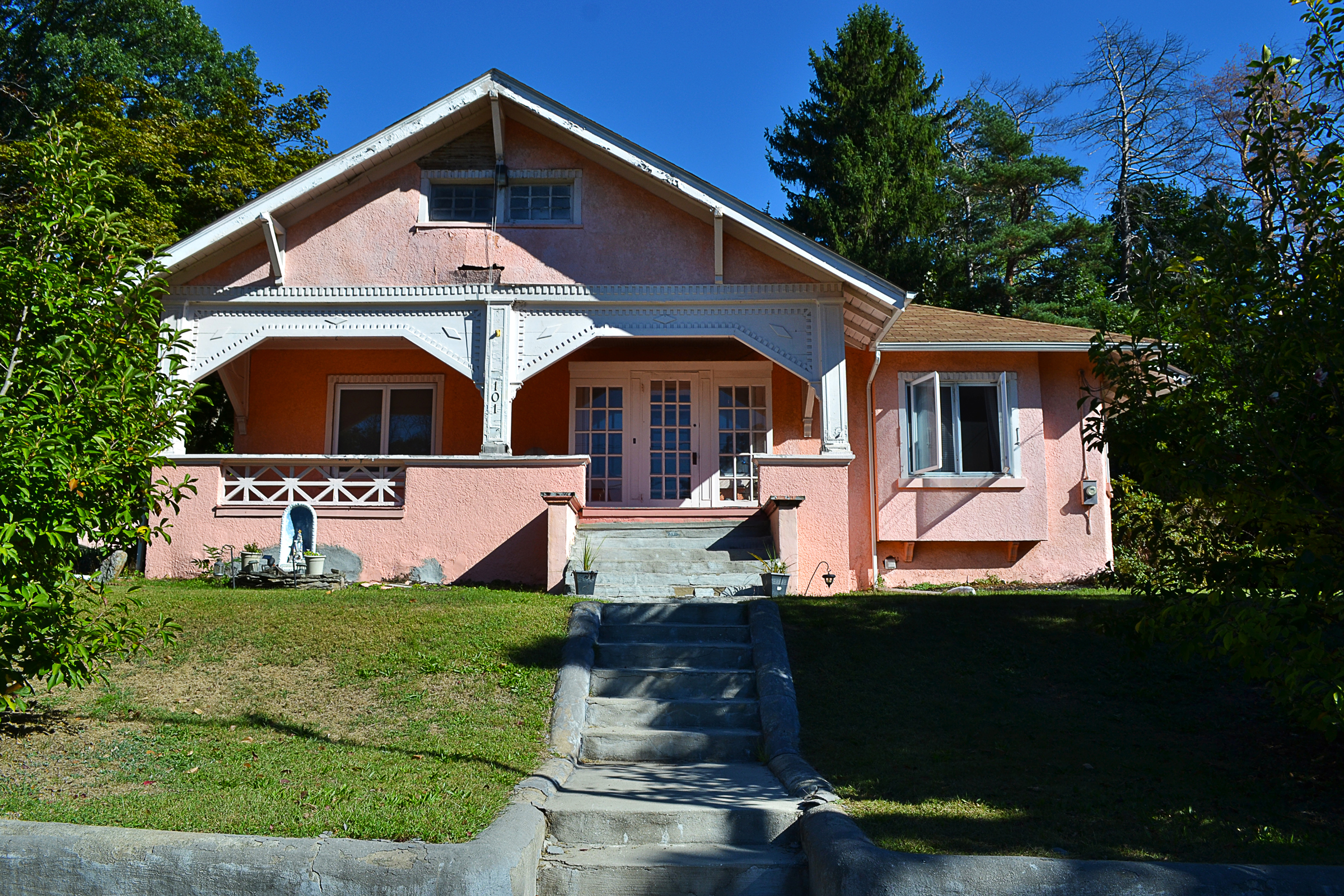
- The house in September 2015

- Location within New York Location within the United States
- Location: 101 Corlies Ave., Poughkeepsie, New York
- Coordinates: 41°42′14″N 73°54′27″W
- Area: less than one acre
- Built: 1925
- Architect: Lloyd, Percival M.
- Architectural style: Bungalow/Craftsman
- MPS: Poughkeepsie MRA
- NRHP reference No.: 82001147
- Added to NRHP: November 26, 1982

Mader House is a historic home located at Poughkeepsie, Dutchess County, New York. It was built about 1925 and is a 1 1/2-story, three-bay-wide bungalow-style dwelling with a low-pitched roof. It is sheathed in pink stucco and sits on a raised basement. It features a spacious front porch and large multi-paned windows.

It was designed by architect Percival M. Lloyd. Lloyd has nine buildings on the National Register, including the Hudson Valley's first skyscraper - a six story bank building also in Poughkeepsie.

It was added to the National Register of Historic Places in 1982.
