= Charles Morschauser House =

Historic house in New York, United States

- U.S. National Register of Historic Places
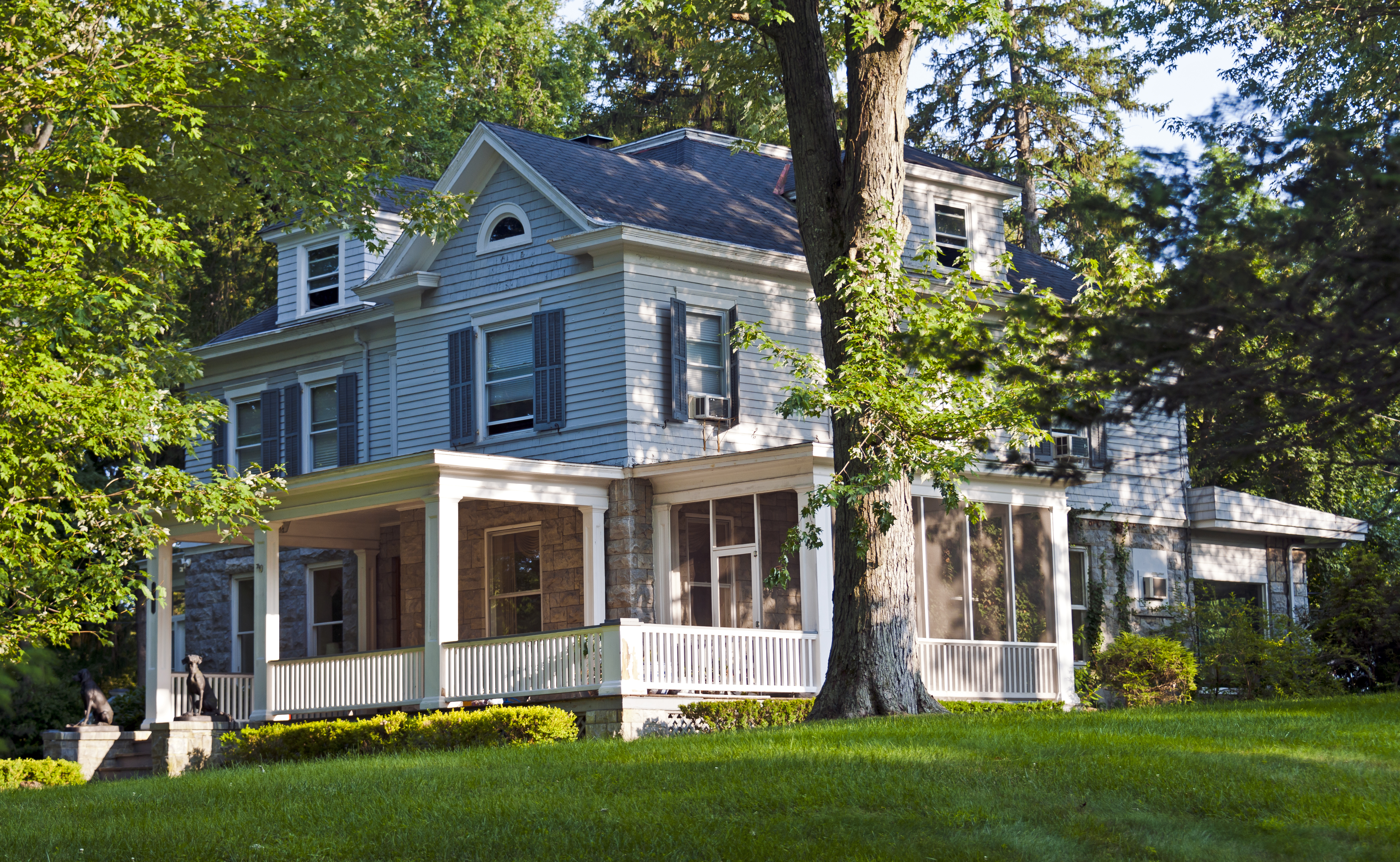
- Charles Morschauser House, August 2014

- Location within New York Location within the United States
- Location: 115 Hooker Ave., Poughkeepsie, New York
- Coordinates: 41°41′25″N 73°55′19″W
- Area: 2.42 acres (0.98 ha)
- Built: 1902
- Architect: Beardsley, William J.
- Architectural style: Colonial Revival, Queen Anne
- NRHP reference No.: 14000487
- Added to NRHP: August 18, 2014

Charles Morschauser House, also known as the House on the Hill, is a historic home located at Poughkeepsie, Dutchess County, New York. It was built in 1902, and is a 2 1/2-story, frame dwelling with a hipped roof and a projecting, offset front gable. The façade features a one-story, flat-roofed, wraparound porch.

The house belonged to a local attorney, Charles Morschauser, who commissioned local architect William J. Beardsley to design the home after he had represented him in a legal matter. Morschauser had acquired an almost 3-acre parcel that had formerly been part of an estate named Mountain View, located on an oversized city lot fronting five different streets. Due to its dignified and grand appearance perched atop a knoll, the design had gained local attention in a couple of newspapers at the time. It is a transitional style containing elements of Queen Anne and Colonial Revival architecture with a blending of materials. The first story boasts a stonework façade while the second has clapboard siding, allowing it to stand out from other houses constructed at the time.

It was added to the National Register of Historic Places in 2014.

== See also ==
- National Register of Historic Places listings in Poughkeepsie, New York
