= William J. Beardsley =

American architect (1872–1934)

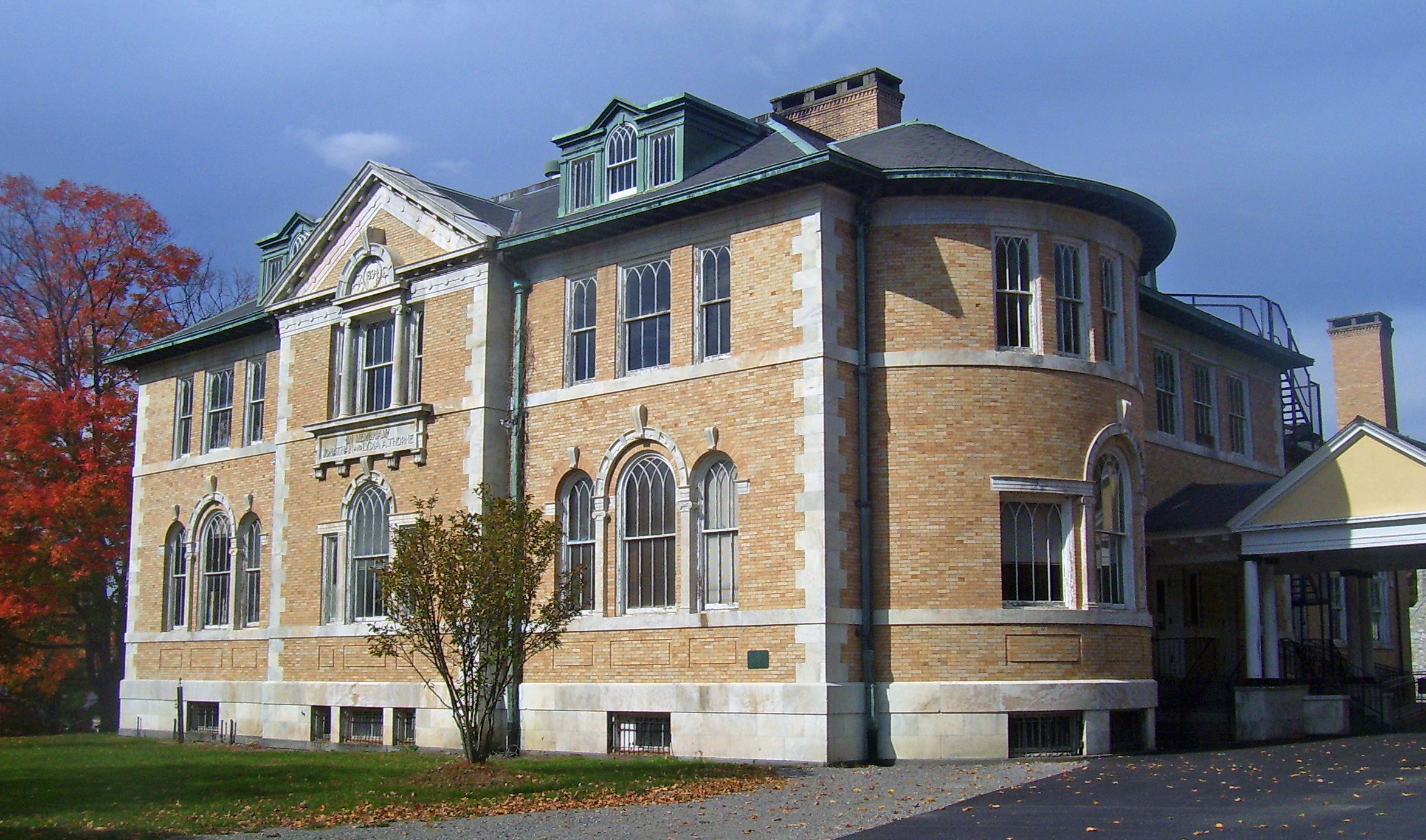
The Thorne Memorial School in Millbrook, designed by Beardsley and completed in 1895.

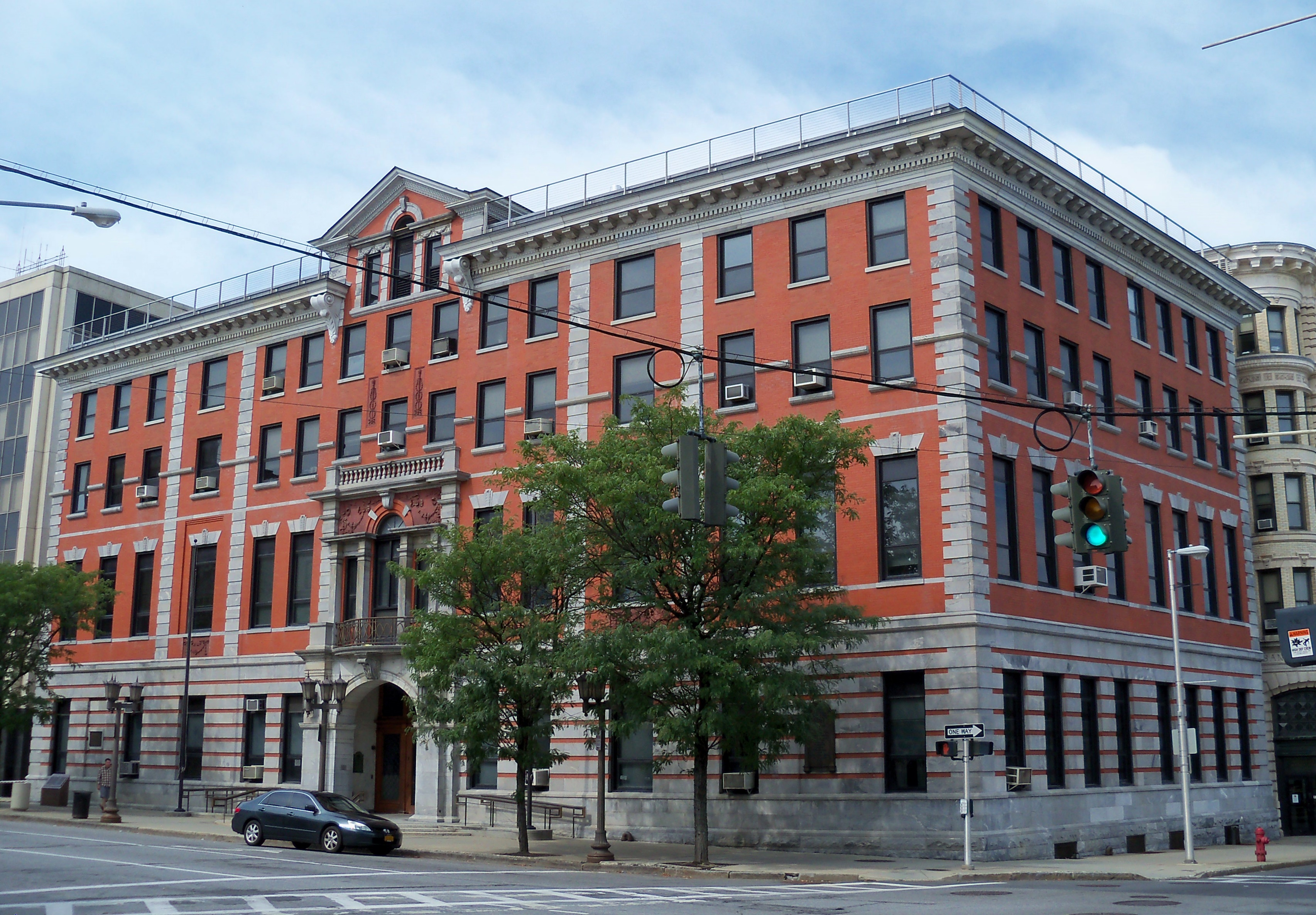
The Dutchess County Courthouse in Poughkeepsie, completed in 1903.

William J. Beardsley (1872 – March 29, 1934) was a Poughkeepsie, New York-based architect.

== Biography ==
He was born in Poughkeepsie, New York, the son of one of Poughkeepsie's leading sash and blind manufacturers. He studied architecture in New York City for two years and opened his practice at Poughkeepsie in 1893. He designed public and private buildings throughout New York State in a variety of popular late-19th and early-20th century architectural styles including the Queen Anne, Colonial Revival, and Shingle Style. In addition to private dwellings, he designed courthouses in ten counties, tuberculosis hospitals for Oneida and Nassau Counties, a welfare home for Erie County, and the Attica State Prison. In 1909, he won an architectural competition for his design for the proposed prison in Bear Mountain State Park for a relocated Sing Sing Prison, but the project was never carried through.

== Selected works ==
- Contributing buildings in the Academy Street Historic District (Poughkeepsie, New York), listed on the National Register of Historic Places in 1982.
- 1895: Thorne Memorial School, listed on the National Register of Historic Places in 1996.
- 1902: Charles Morschauser House, listed on the National Register of Historic Places in 2014.
- 1902-1903: Dutchess County Courthouse, listed on the National Register of Historic Places in 1982.
- 1903: Genesee County Sheriff's Office and Jail, listed on the National Register of Historic Places in 1982.
- 1905: Hyde Park Firehouse, listed on the National Register of Historic Places in 1993.
- 1905: Union Baptist Church (Baltimore, Maryland), listed on the National Register of Historic Places in 2009.
- 1908: O. H. Booth Hose Company, listed on the National Register of Historic Places in 1982.
- 1924-1928 (renovations): Old Nassau County Courthouse (New York), listed on the National Register of Historic Places in 1978.
- 1930: Parish House of the St. Peter's Episcopal Church Complex (Auburn, New York), listed on the National Register of Historic Places in 2002.
