= Poughkeepsie Trust Company =

Historic commercial building in New York, United States

- U.S. National Register of Historic Places
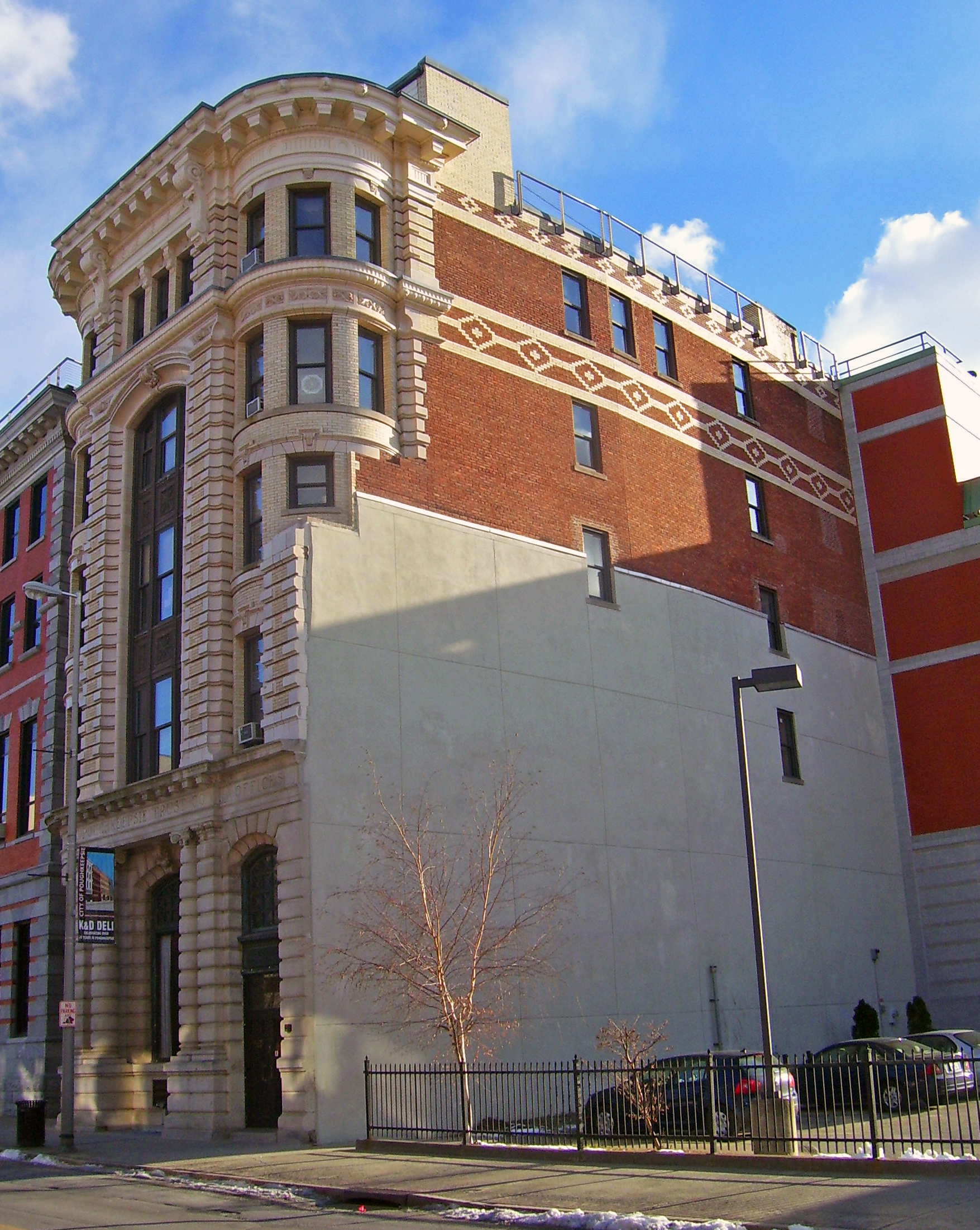
- Front elevation and west profile, 2008

- Location within New York Location within the United States
- Interactive map showing the location for Poughkeepsie Trust Company
- Location: Poughkeepsie
- Coordinates: 41°42′14″N 72°55′47″W
- Built: 1906
- Architect: Percival Lloyd
- Architectural style: Beaux Arts
- NRHP reference No.: 82001159
- Added to NRHP: 1982

The Poughkeepsie Trust Company building is located on Main Street in that city in the U.S. state of New York. It is immediately to the east of, and joined to, the Dutchess County Court House.

Local architect Percival Lloyd designed the building, the bank's second on that site, as the Hudson Valley's first modern skyscraper at six stories in height. It cost $100,000 to build and included an ornately-carved stone facade. Brick, steel and stone were used in the interior framing. Inside, the ground floor was the site of a Mycenaean marble banking room, with intact mahogany furniture, brass fittings and bronze lighting. A special "ladies' corridor" was built near the women's restroom so that women could go to and back from it without having to use the main corridor. The upper floors were reached by means of an elevator, then another pioneering piece of technology.

The three-bay Beaux Arts facade begins at the top with masks on the cornice and molded egg-and-dart rear modillion blocks. It gives way to a leafy swag motif above the molded frieze. Similar patterns continue down the stories, joined by quoined pilasters. The ground level is totally quoined and projects, with an intricate wrought-iron gate on the main door and decorative Doric columns. On the sides, a red-and-yellow brick diamond pattern runs from front to rear at the fifth story.

It opened in 1906. The New York City Water Supply Commission, then looking in the region for future supplies for the growing city, was an early tenant. It rented the entire fifth floor and half the fourth, ultimately planning and supervising the land acquisition and construction for what became the Catskill Aqueduct from the bank building.

The bank would eventually leave the building and become part of the Bank of New York. The county took it over, joining it to the adjacent courthouse, built a few years earlier. In 1982 the building was added to the National Register of Historic Places, one of three downtown bank buildings in the city eventually listed. Today it is headquarters to the district attorney's office.

== See also ==
- National Register of Historic Places listings in Poughkeepsie, New York
