= Dwight–Hooker Avenue Historic District =

Historic district in New York, United States

- U.S. National Register of Historic Places
- U.S. Historic district
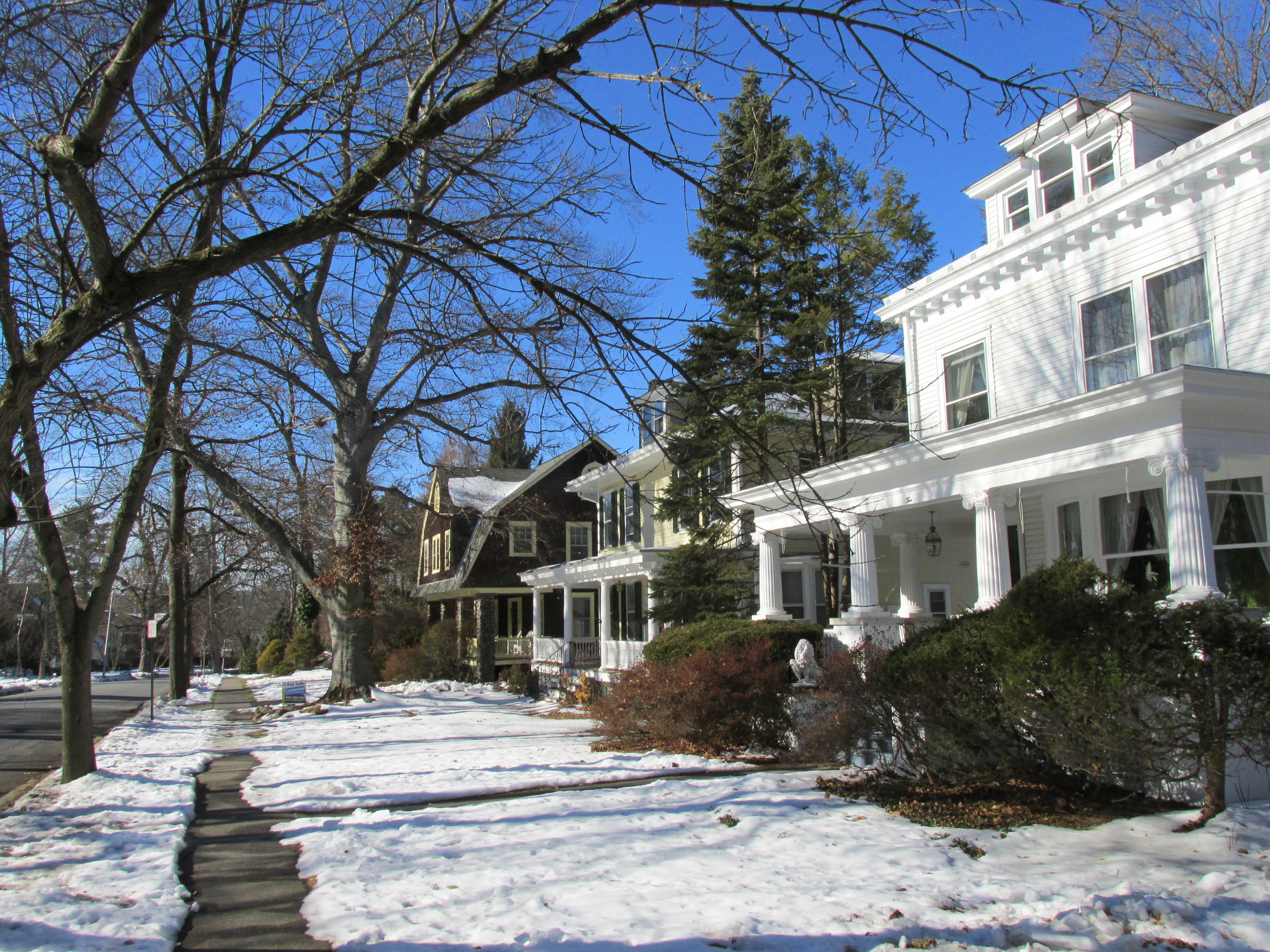
- Houses on Dwight Street, January 2013

- Location within New York Location within the United States
- Location: Dwight St. from Hamilton to Hooker, and 79-85 Hooker Ave., Poughkeepsie, New York
- Coordinates: 41°41′39″N 73°55′26″W
- Area: 6 acres (2.4 ha)
- Architect: Lloyd, Percival M.; Carpenter, Dubois
- Architectural style: Late 19th And 20th Century Revivals, Shingle Style
- MPS: Poughkeepsie MRA
- NRHP reference No.: 82001132
- Added to NRHP: November 26, 1982

Dwight–Hooker Avenue Historic District is a national historic district located at Poughkeepsie, Dutchess County, New York. It includes 17 contributing residential buildings in the most architecturally significant, turn of the 20th century neighborhood in Poughkeepsie. Most of the houses were built between 1895 and 1915 and are in a variety of popular revival styles. They are mostly 2 1/2 to 3 1/2 stories in height.

It was added to the National Register of Historic Places in 1982.
