= Lady Washington Hose Company building =

- Lady Washington Hose Company
- U.S. National Register of Historic Places
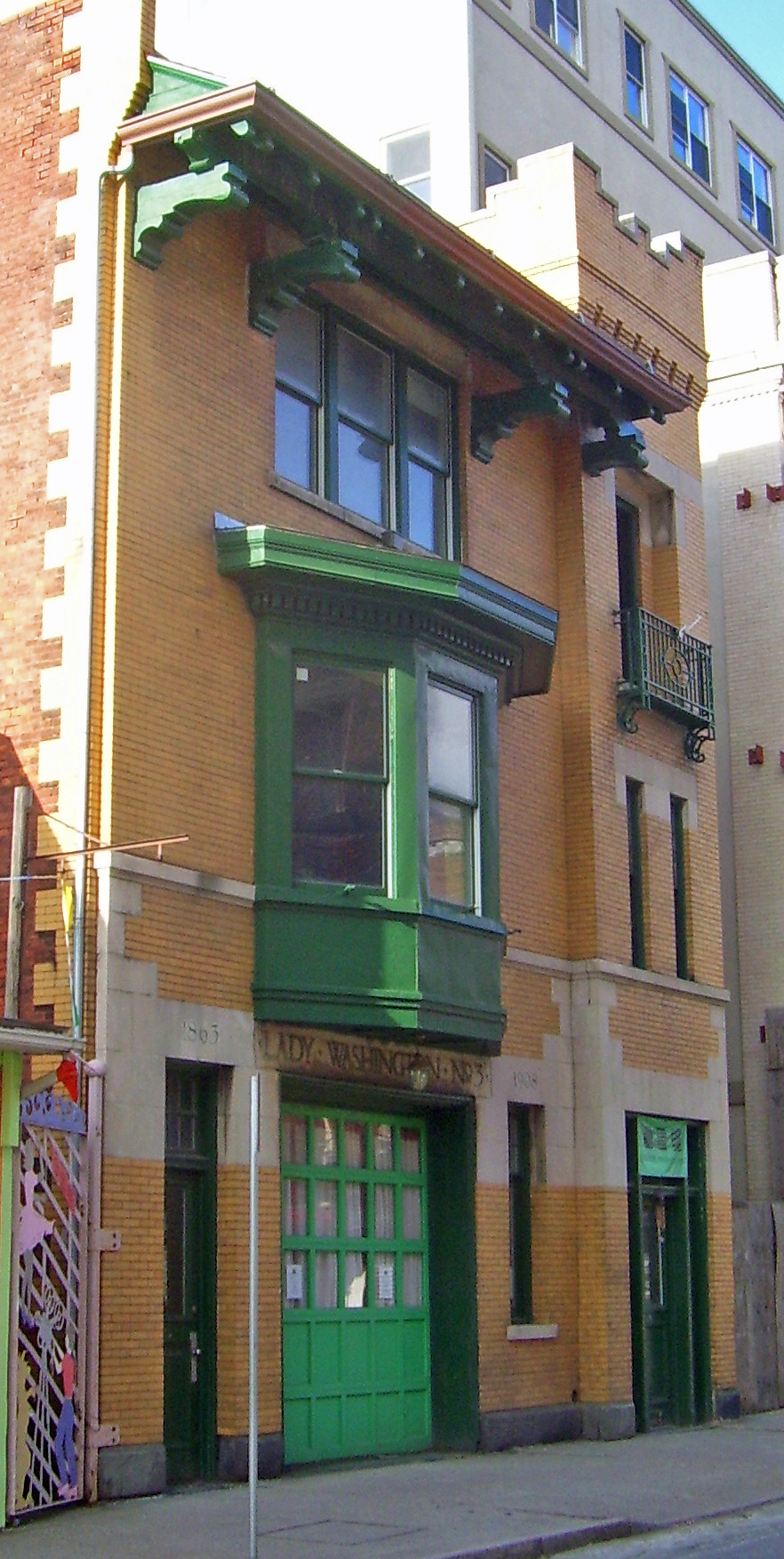
- Front elevation in 2007
- Location: Poughkeepsie, NY
- Coordinates: 41°42′07″N 73°55′33″W
- Built: 1908
- Architect: Percival Lloyd
- MPS: Poughkeepsie MRA
- NRHP reference No.: 82001145
- Added to NRHP: 1982

The Lady Washington Hose Company building is located on Academy Street in downtown Poughkeepsie, New York, United States. It was once home to one of the city's volunteer companies of the same name and subsequently housed the Children's Media Project. It is currently owned by two Poughkeepsie artists. . It is an unusual combination of different architectural styles.

The company was created in 1863 when the city bought new fire engines for the Niagara and Cataract companies. This forced the Neptune Company out of business, and it was accordingly reorganized as the Lady Washington. The firehouse was built in 1908.

Local architect Percival M. Lloyd was hired to design the building, and he in turn subcontracted the construction to the O'Donnell Construction Company, another local firm. The resulting structure has a yellow brick facade. A corbelled soffit holds the Japanese-style tiled roof. A small wing shows signs of a Gothic Revival influence with its castellated roofline. The facade's second story is dominated by a hanging bay window. The soffit, bay window and single garage door at street level are currently painted a bright green in contrast with the facade.

The interior is largely intact. The Japanese influence on the roof continues with its supporting rafters visible.

After the city's fire department absorbed the company, the building was reused as a warehouse by the Southeastern New York Library Council. It was listed on the National Register of Historic Places in 1982, one of three of the city's former firehouses so listed (the other two are the O. H. Booth Hose Company and the Niagara Engine House).
