= Niagara Engine House =

Fire station in Poughkeepsie, New York

- U.S. National Register of Historic Places
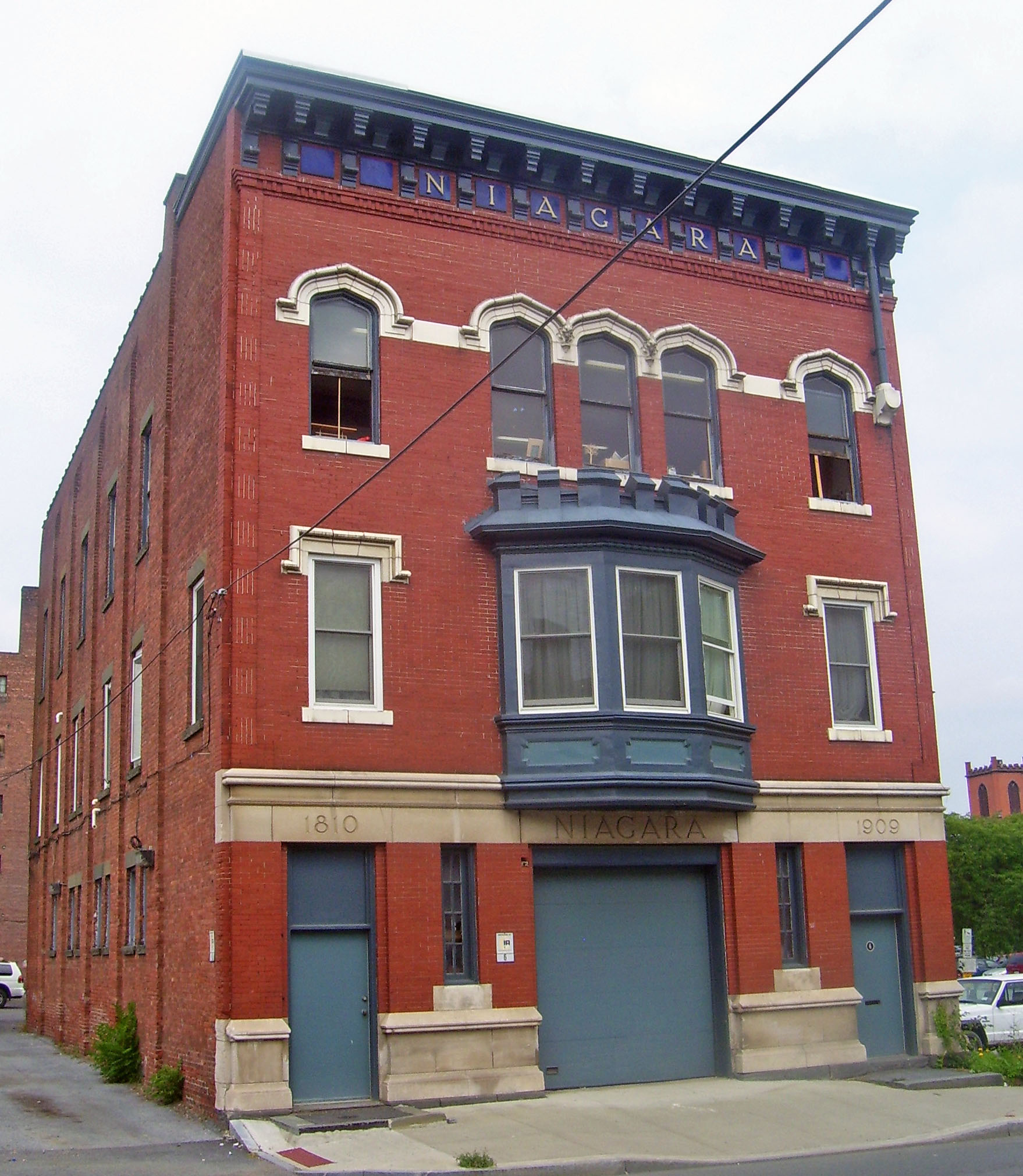
- East (front) elevation and south profile, 2008
- Location: Poughkeepsie, NY
- Coordinates: 41°42′09″N 73°55′24″W
- Built: 1909
- Architect: Percival M. Lloyd
- Architectural style: Late Gothic Revival
- MPS: Poughkeepsie MRA
- NRHP reference No.: 82001155
- Added to NRHP: 1982

The Niagara Engine House is located on North Hamilton Street in downtown Poughkeepsie, New York, United States. It is a brick building constructed in the early 20th century, the only extant fire house of the six engine companies that once protected the city.

It was designed by local architect Percival M. Lloyd in a late application of the Gothic Revival architectural style. In 1982 it, along with two other old Poughkeepsie firehouses, was listed on the National Register of Historic Places.

== Building ==
The firehouse is a brick building three stories high with three to five bays in each story. The front facade faces east. Beneath the flat roof is a projecting cornice and brick frieze with blue squares on which "Niagara" is spelled out. It is supported by large brackets alternating with smaller ones.

Fenestration is varied. The third-story windows have pointed arches. The central window on the story below is a projecting bay window with a castellated top and diamond-shaped lights. Above the first story is a molded stone cornice with letters spelling out "1810 NIAGARA 1909".

A stone course separates the first and second stories. Brick pilasters frame the main garage door. The interior retains its tiled floor, brass pole and flooring.

== History ==
The engine company that became Niagara was organized in 1810, as the building facade suggests, but did not start going by that name until 1847. Six engine companies are known to have been in service during the city's history. This is the only one whose building is extant.

In 1909 local architect Percival M. Lloyd, who had earlier designed the eclectic Lady Washington Hose Company building a few blocks to the south on Academy Street, was hired to build the new one. His building includes many features of the Gothic Revival II style, which was used for many public buildings in the early 20th century ... the projecting central bay, roof castellation, stone lintels with drip molding and arches, the stone course between the two lower floors and a mock stone basement at ground level.

A private ambulance company moved into the lower floor after the fire department left the building. They left its features intact.

== See also ==
- National Register of Historic Places listings in Poughkeepsie, New York
