= Dutchess County Court House =

- U.S. National Register of Historic Places
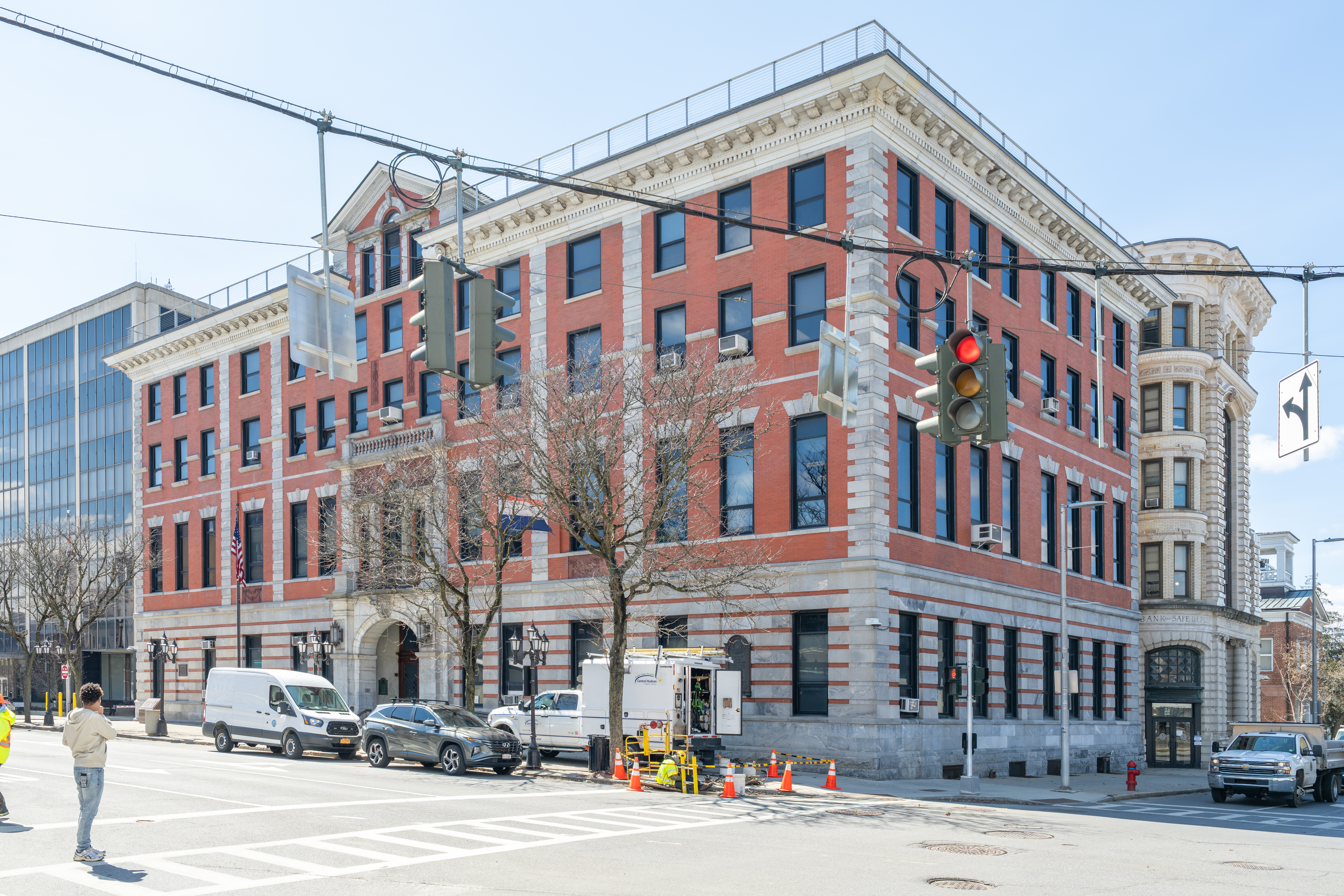
- Courthouse in 2026

- Location within New York Location within the United States
- Interactive map showing the location for Dutchess County Courthouse
- Location: Poughkeepsie, NY
- Coordinates: 41°42′14″N 73°55′46″W
- Built: 1903
- Architect: William J. Beardsley
- Architectural style: Classical Revival
- MPS: Historic Resources of the City of Poughkeepsie
- NRHP reference No.: 82001130
- Added to NRHP: 1982

The Dutchess County Courthouse is located at 10 Market Street in downtown Poughkeepsie, New York, United States. Built in 1903, it is the third county courthouse to stand on that site.

The first was authorized by the provincial assembly in 1717 and built in 1720 and would host New York's debate on ratifying the U.S. Constitution during the brief period when Poughkeepsie served as the state capital in 1788. It was destroyed in an 1806 fire. Three years later the state legislature appropriated funds for a new one, which stood for almost a century. An early tenant beside the courts was brewer Matthew Vassar, later founder of Vassar College, who ran an alehouse and oyster bar in the basement.

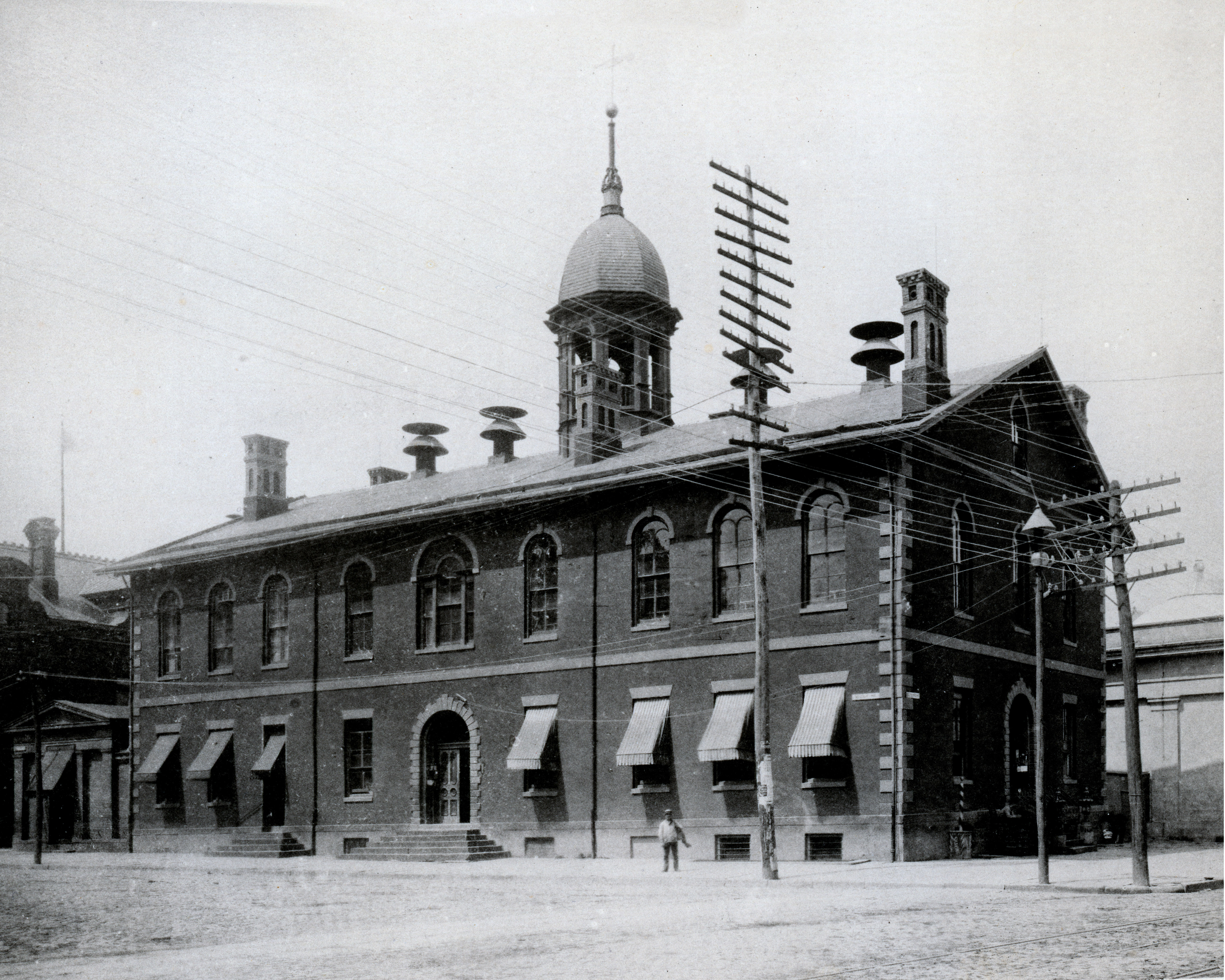
Dutchess County Court House Poughkeepsie 1809 to 1902

It was replaced by the current building, a four-story Classical Revival designed by local architect William J. Beardsley. Faced with red brick, the half-million-dollar structure featured Palladian windows in the second and fifth-story center bays with stucco decoration above. It opened and was dedicated just before the end of 1903.

Later alterations were made under the direction of Charles Cooke, who designed the nearby offices of the Poughkeepsie Journal. The building's cornice is the only element that has been significantly changed from the original design. It has also been joined to the Poughkeepsie Trust Company building to its immediate east on Main Street, which serves as the district attorney's offices.

In 1982, it was added to the National Register of Historic Places. Today, it houses judges' chambers and clerks' offices as well as courtrooms. Most of the court's lesser functions, such as property recordkeeping, have been moved to an annex next door, built in the 1960s. In the late 1990s, it was the venue for former Dutchess assistant district attorney Stephen Pagones's defamation suit against Al Sharpton, C. Vernon Mason and Alton Maddox over allegations they made against him during the Tawana Brawley affair.
