= Wappinger (disambiguation) =

The Wappinger were an American tribe native to eastern New York.

Wappinger may also refer to:

- Wappinger, New York, a town named for the tribe
- Wappingers Falls, New York, a village located in the Town of Wappinger and the Town of Poughkeepsie
- Wappinger Creek, a tributary of the Hudson River
- Wappingers Central School District
- Kieft's War, also known as the Wappinger War, a 17th-century conflict between the Dutch and the Native Americans
