= Union Free School (New Hamburg, New York) =

Historic school building in New York, United States

- U.S. National Register of Historic Places
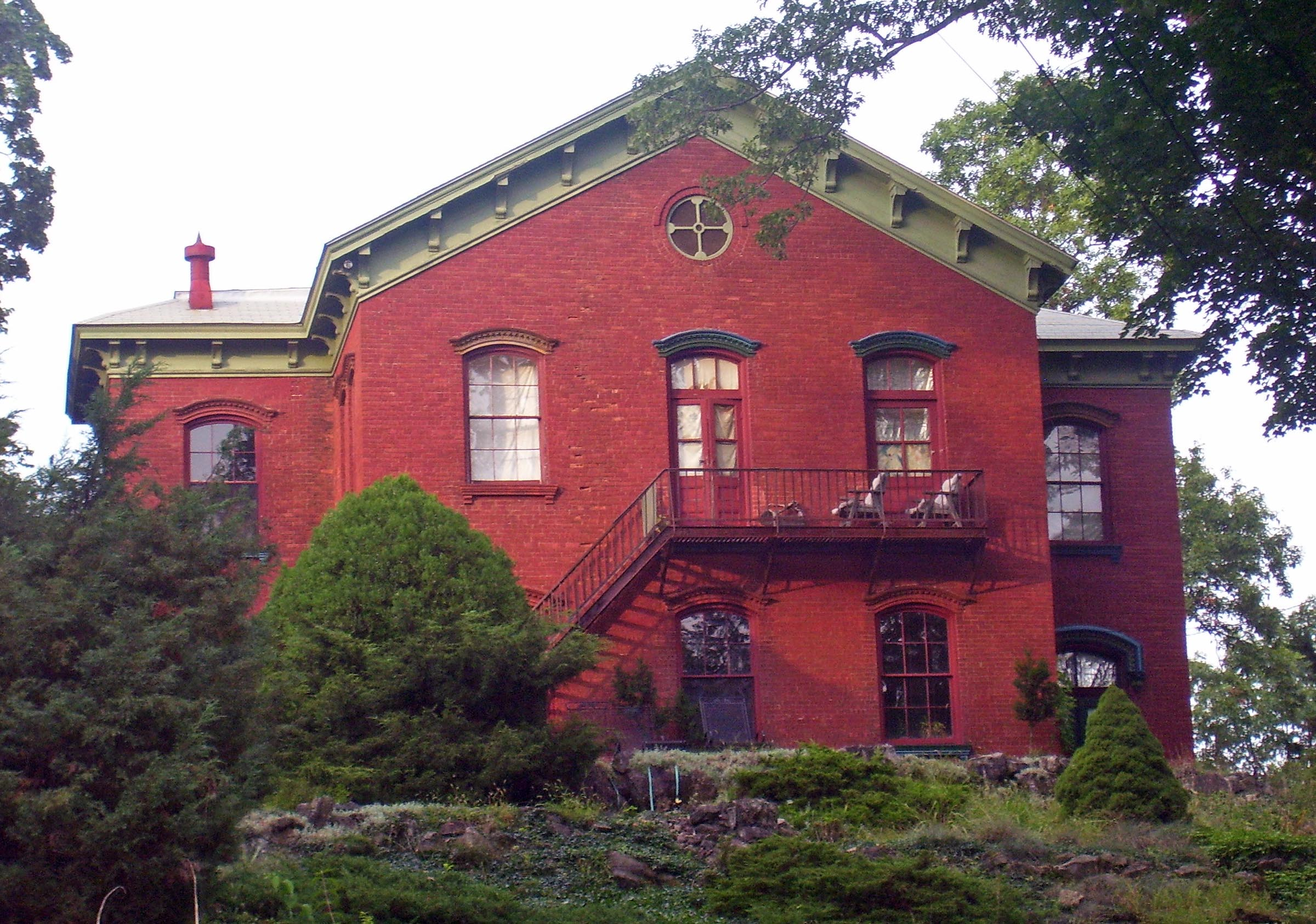
- South elevation, 2008
- Location: New Hamburg, NY
- Nearest city: Poughkeepsie
- Coordinates: 41°35′20″N 73°56′42″W
- Built: ca. 1875
- Architectural style: Italianate
- MPS: New Hamburg MRA
- NRHP reference No.: 87000117
- Added to NRHP: 1987

The former Union Free School is located at the end of Conklin Street in New Hamburg, New York, United States. It is a red brick building constructed in the 1870s.

For many years it was the only public building in the hamlet. It remained in use as school for over a half a century. Since then it has been converted into a residence. In 1987 it was listed on the National Register of Historic Places.

== Building ==
The school is at the western edge of a one-acre (4,400 m^{2}) lot at the top of a rise on the northeastern edge of the older section of the city of New Hamburg. It has a view south toward the Wappinger Creek estuary at the Hudson River. The land to the west and north is wooded. Some of the original property has since been subdivided and developed with more modern houses.

The building itself is a two-story brick structure on a stone foundation with a gabled roof. Asphalt shingles cover the original tin. Its line is marked by broad projecting eaves with a bracketed cornice on all sides. The slightly arched windows have projecting hoods and sills of cast iron. A round vent is in the gable peak on the south (front) elevation, and a fire escape runs across the front.

On the east and west are two projecting entrance pavilions. They are similar to the main block in decoration but have flat roofs. The west one, which originally rose to a bell tower on the third story, has a transomed entrance with a decorative hood stopped with corbels.

The interior plan is intact. A second floor gym/auditorium space has not been further partitioned, and a large classroom on the first floor still has cast-iron columns in the center and one of its original blackboards.

== History ==
The building was probably begun in the early 1870s, during New Hamburg's peak years as a river port. It replaced an old one-room schoolhouse on the main road towards Poughkeepsie, and is first shown on an 1876 map. At the time of its construction it was the only Free School in the Town of Poughkeepsie, with its own local school board.

It is still in basic form a one-room schoolhouse, but five times larger than the extant Grammar School in Chelsea to the south. Its size and placement on the rise overlooking the river suggest the pride the community of New Hamburg took in it. The modest decoration shows the widespread acceptance of the Picturesque aesthetic in the area at the time.

It remained in use until the district was absorbed into the Wappinger Central School District in 1940. After the war it was used as a plastic factory for a while. It lay vacant and was later restored into a house, with art studio space.

== See also ==
- National Register of Historic Places listings in Poughkeepsie, New York
