= John Jay High School (Hopewell Junction, New York) =

John Jay Senior High School
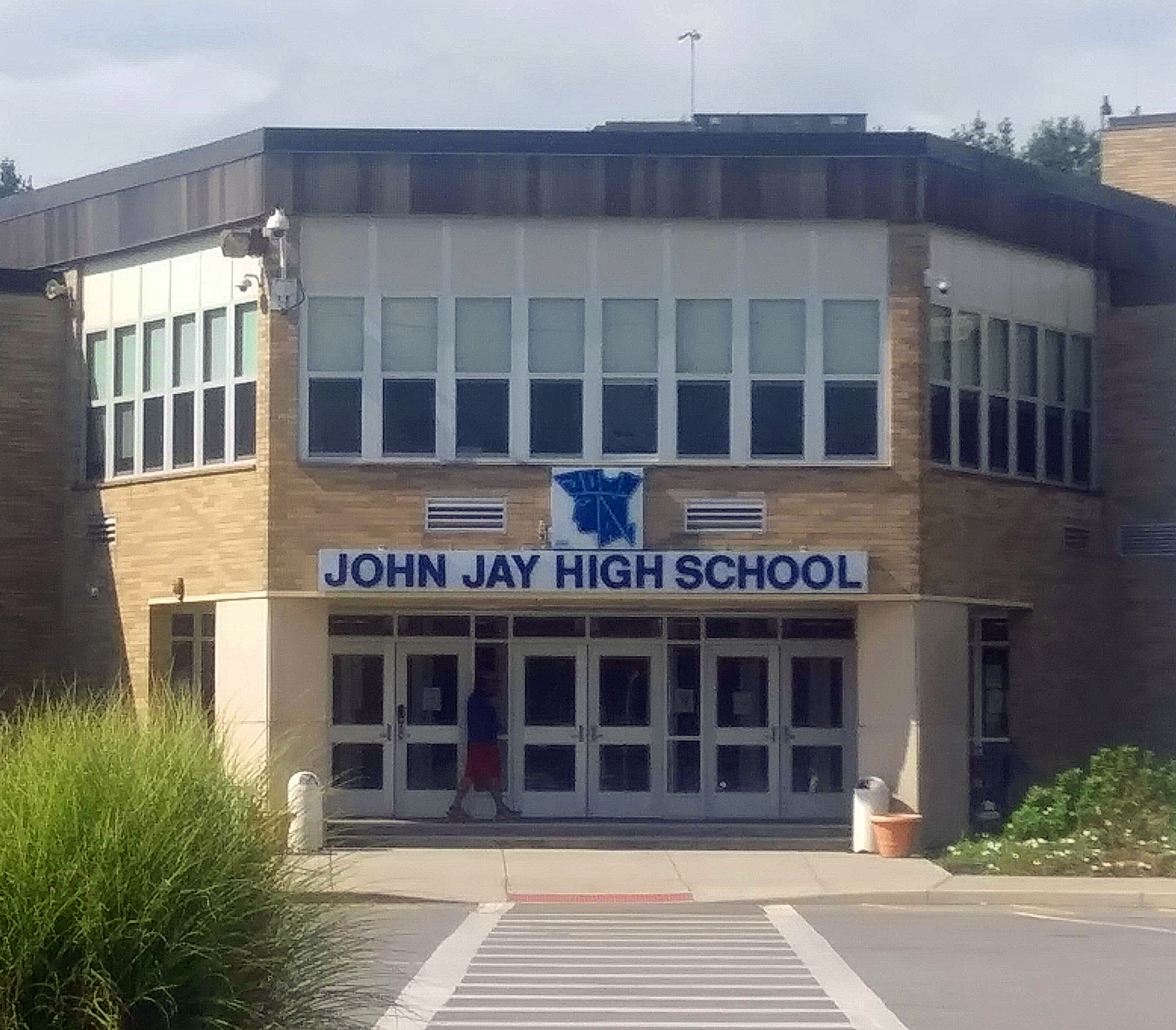

Location
- 2012 State Route 52; East Fishkill, New York, 12533; United States; 41.54043°N 73.83322°W

Information
- Type: Public Secondary
- Established: 1968
- School district: Wappingers Central School District
- Principal: David Kedzielawa
- Teaching staff: 129.42 (on an FTE basis))
- Grades: 9-12
- Enrollment: 1,768 (2024–2025)
- Student to teacher ratio: 13.66
- Campus: Suburban
- Colors: Navy Blue; Light Blue; White
- Athletics: Football; Soccer; Gymnastics; Swimming; Track and Field; Basketball; Lacrosse; Wrestling; Baseball; Crew; Hockey; Tennis; Cross Country; Golf; Bowling; Volleyball
- Athletics conference: Section 1 (NYSPHSAA): League C; Class AA
- Mascot: Patriot
- Rival: Roy C. Ketcham High School; Arlington High School
- Newspaper: The Patriot Post
- Yearbook: Patriots
- Website: jjhs.wappingersschools.org

John Jay Senior High School is a public high school on State Route 52 in the town of East Fishkill, New York. The school teaches grades 9 through 12. Students from Van Wyck Junior High School who have successfully completed the 8th grade continue to the 9th grade at John Jay. The school is a part of the Wappingers Central School District.

== History ==
John Jay was built in 1968 and opened in September 1969 to accommodate the growth of the Wappingers School District. Prior to its construction, Roy C. Ketcham High School was the district's only high school, 8 miles (13 km) away in Wappingers Falls. The 1973 graduating class was the first class to have completed four full years at John Jay HS.

In 2002, a new biology and chemistry wing was opened for these laboratory courses. In 2009, a new math wing opened on the first floor.

As part of a district-wide capital improvement project approved in 2025, construction began in the summer of 2026 for an artificial turf field for soccer and softball, and a press box.

Since 2018, John Jay's principal has been David Kedzielawa.

== Nearby businesses ==
The school was geographically surrounded by IBM Microelectronics before the closure of its East Campus, which was replaced by an Amazon distribution warehouse that opened 2022 and a Stellantis distribution warehouse that opened in 2025. IBM's former West campus is now iPark which hosts a variety of business along with a small IBM presence, including an unopened Frito-Lay fulfillment center.

The presence of IBM in the area helped to fund engineering programs at the school. John Jay offers many classes focused on engineering, with some classes utilizing college-level computer programs and mathematics. Some of the classes are eligible for college credit through the Rochester Institute of Technology.

== Feeder schools ==
=== Elementary schools ===
- Brinckerhoff Elementary School in Fishkill, New York
- Fishkill Elementary School in Fishkill, New York
- Fishkill Plains Elementary School in East Fishkill, New York
- Gayhead Elementary School in East Fishkill, New York

=== Junior high schools ===
- Van Wyck Junior High School in East Fishkill, New York

== Notable alumni ==
- Jake Keegan, professional American soccer player
- Patti Murin, Actress, “Anna” in Frozen (musical)
- Joe Panik, retired MLB player
