= KPOU =

KPOU may refer to:

- Hudson Valley Regional Airport (ICAO code KPOU)
- KUNP, a television station (channel 16) licensed to La Grande, Oregon, United States, which held the call sign KPOU from May 2002 to December 2006
