= Dario Brose =

American soccer player and coach (born 1970)

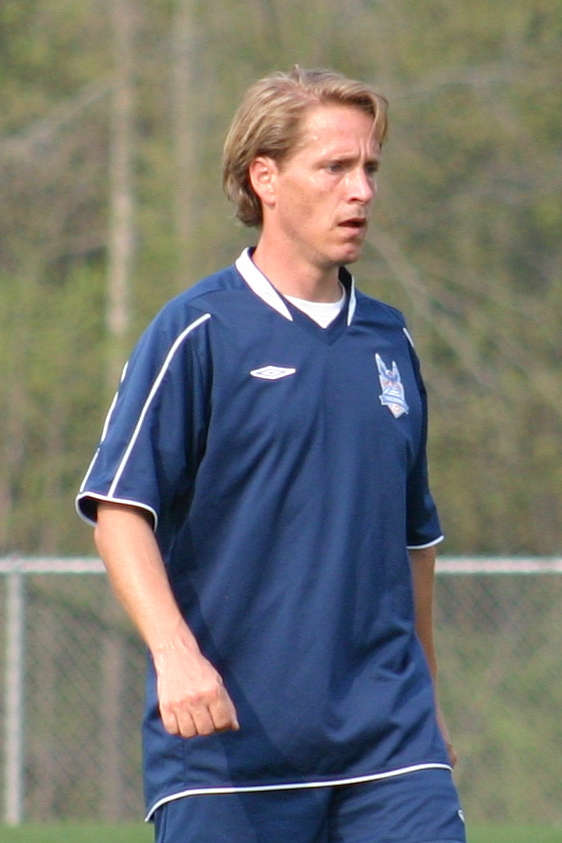
- Brose in 2007

Personal information
- Full name: Dario Brose
- Date of birth: January 27, 1970 (age 56)
- Place of birth: New York City, U.S.
- Height: 5 ft 7 in (1.70 m)
- Position: Midfielder

College career
Years	Team	Apps	(Gls)
1988–1991	NC State Wolfpack		

Senior career*
Years	Team	Apps	(Gls)
1991–1995	Stade Briochin	91	(10)
1995–1999	FC Saarbrücken	105	(22)
1999–2001	San Jose Earthquakes	56	(9)
2007	Carolina RailHawks	1	(0)
Total		253	(41)

International career
- United States U20
1994–1997	United States	4	(1)

Managerial career
- 2002: Mid-Michigan Bucks
- * Club domestic league appearances and goals

Dario Brose (born January 27, 1970) is an American retired soccer player who spent eight seasons in Europe, three in Major League Soccer and one in the USL First Division. He has also coached the Mid-Michigan Bucks of the Premier Development League.

== Youth ==
Dario played his high school soccer for Roy C. Ketcham High School in Wappinger, New York under the direction of coach Jeff Behnke. In 1986 he won the Capital Cup tournament's under-19 championship with New York side Blau Weiss Gottschee of Ridgewood, Queens. Brose played college soccer for North Carolina State University and was named All-American in 1990. That year, the Wolfpack made it to the Final Four. Brose graduated in 1991 with two teammates, Roy Lassiter and Henry Gutierrez, who also had successful professional careers. Another teammate on the Wolfpack, Scott Schweitzer, coached Brose with the Carolina RailHawks. Brose then teamed up with Chris Carrieri who also played in Major League Soccer with Brose for the San Jose Earthquakes.

== Professional ==
After graduation, Brose moved to Europe. There he played with Stade Briochin in France, and FC Saarbrücken in Germany. He established himself as a solid midfielder during his time in Germany. Brose returned to the United States in 1999 to join the San Jose Clash of the MLS. In 2000, he appeared in the All-Star Game. He played his last season in 2001, the year San Jose (since renamed the Earthquakes) won their first championship. He played only one game that year. In 2007, Brose signed with the Carolina RailHawks of the USL-1. He played one game, then retired permanently. Brose then teamed up with Chris Carrieri who also played in the MLS with Brose for the San Jose Earthquakes.

== National team ==
Brose played for the U.S. U-18, U-20, U-23 and Senior men's teams. This included the U.S. team at the 1992 Summer Olympics in Barcelona and the 1989 FIFA U-20 World Cup in Saudi Arabia.

Brose earned four caps for the U.S. national team. He scored one goal during his time with the national team.

== Coaching ==
After his initial retirement from active playing, Brose worked as a staff coach for the Silicon Valley Football Club. On May 1, 2002, the Mid-Michigan Bucks of the Premier Development League hired Brose. He took the team to a 12-5-3 record in his single season with the club. He has also worked as the Director of Youth Development and U-12 girls team of the Triangle Futbol Club. Then he left Triangle Futbol Club (TFC) and went to Carolina Soccer Club. Where he coached U-12 first division boys and U-13 second division boys.

In 2010 Dario left Carolina Soccer Club and coached U-12 & U-13 1st division boys teams with Triangle United Soccer Association (TUSA) based out of Chapel Hill, North Carolina. His stint was short lived, and in 2011 he left Triangle United and began coaching with Fuquay Varina Athletic Association (FVAA) out of Fuquay-Varina, North Carolina.

Coach Brose led a talented team of 2002 boys named "NC Elite" to the SuperCupNI Globe division Championship in 2019 emerging victorious against a strong Celtic FC 02 team (Scottish FA Youth Cup Finalist 2019) in a 2:1 Win. NC Elite finished higher in the 2019 SuperCupNI Premier Section standings (2002 and younger) than all other North American, South American, and Asian teams.

== Honors ==
Individual

- MLS All-Star: 2000
