= Chelsea Grammar School =

- U.S. National Register of Historic Places
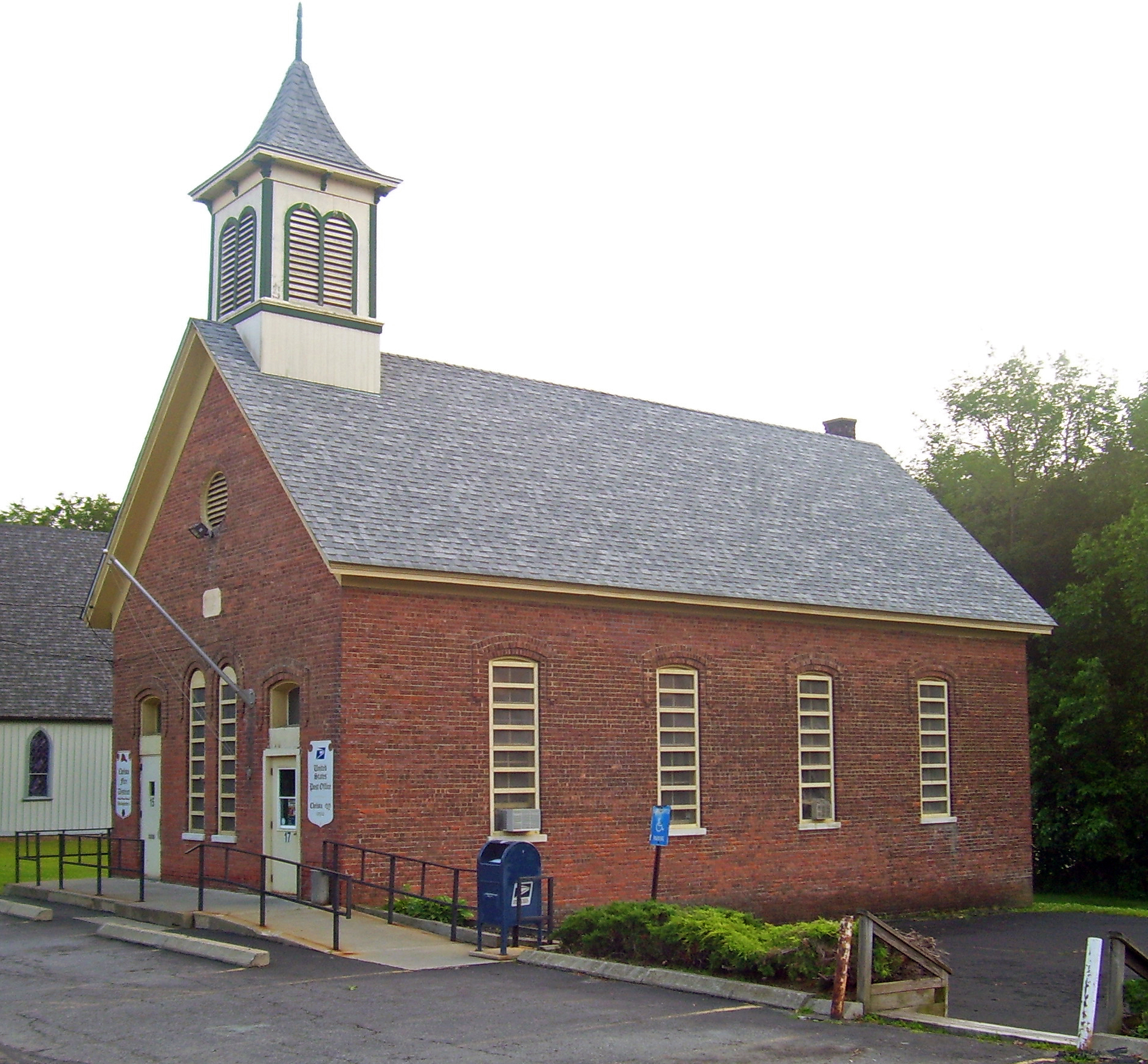
- East (front) elevation and north profile, 2008
- Location: Chelsea, Dutchess County, New York
- Nearest city: Beacon
- Coordinates: 41°33′08″N 73°58′03″W
- Built: 1875
- Architectural style: Gothic Revival
- MPS: Chelsea MRA
- NRHP reference No.: 87001371
- Added to NRHP: 1987

The former Chelsea Grammar School is located on Liberty Street in Chelsea, Dutchess County, New York, United States. It is an intact one-room schoolhouse from the late 19th century, when the hamlet was a thriving Hudson River port.

In 1987 it was added to the National Register of Historic Places since it has remained largely intact since its construction. Its use as a school ended in the mid-20th century when the smaller local school districts of the area were consolidated into the Wappingers Central School District. Since then, the local fire department has used half of it as a community center, and the United States Postal Service has leased the other half for use as the local post office, serving the 12512 ZIP Code.

== Building ==
The building, a one-story rectangular brick building with a gabled roof covered in asphalt shingles, was constructed in 1875. It is pierced at the east (front) end by a square frame bell tower with paired arched louvered vents on all four sides. The roof overhangs the walls with a broad fascia; there is no other attempt at ornament.

On the front façade, the entranceway's segmented and hooded openings are flanked by two windows with arched heads and corbeled brick hoods. A marble datestone with "1875" on it is set into the gable side above the entrance, and a louvered oculus is near the apex.

Both sides have four tall and narrow window openings, now filled with louvers. All are topped with a corbeled and segmented brick lintel and have a stone sill beneath. There are two similar windows in the rear, as well as a newer one, and an enclosed entranceway.

Inside, it retains many of its classroom features, including the blackboards. It has been partitioned since then for its use as a post office.

== History ==
An 1858 map of the Chelsea area shows an earlier school on the same site. When the new one was built, the Gothic Revival style echoed the steeply-pitched roofs of neighboring St. Mark's Episcopal Church, built in the mid-1860s in the same style. The placement of the two buildings, on a rise in the middle of the community overlooking the river that was its commercial lifeblood, reflected their importance within Chelsea.

A few changes have been made since its construction, most since its use as a school ended. The original front doors have been replaced with metallic fire doors. A window has been added to the rear along with an enclosed entryway and a shed built in the rear. When the post office came in, the side windows were louvered shut.
