= Samuel Cooper (general) =

Adjutant and Inspector General of the armies of the Confederate States

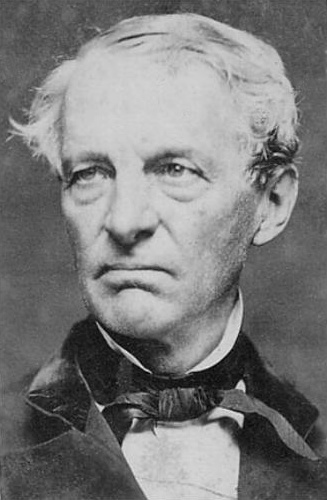
- Born: June 12, 1798; New Hackensack, New York, US
- Died: December 3, 1876 (aged 78); Alexandria, Virginia, US
- Burial place: Christ Church Cemetery, Alexandria, Virginia, US
- Military career
- Allegiance: United States; Confederate States
- Branch: United States Army (USA); Confederate States Army (CSA)
- Service years: 1815–1861 (USA); 1861–1865 (CSA)
- Rank: Colonel (USA); General (CSA)
- Commands: Adjutant general; Inspector general
- Conflicts: Second Seminole War; Mexican–American War; American Civil War

Samuel Cooper (June 12, 1798 – December 3, 1876) was an American military officer, who served in the Second Seminole War and the Mexican–American War in the United States Army. Although little-known today, Cooper was technically the highest-ranking general officer in the Confederate States Army throughout the American Civil War, even outranking Robert E. Lee. After the conflict, Cooper remained in Virginia as a farmer.

== Early life and career ==
Samuel Cooper was born in New Hackensack, Dutchess County, New York. He was one of the sons of Samuel Cooper and his wife Mary Horton. In 1813, he entered the United States Military Academy at age 15. He graduated 36th in a class of 40 two years later (the standard length of study in that period.) He was appointed a brevet second lieutenant in the U.S. Light Artillery on December 11, 1815. He was promoted to first lieutenant in 1821 and to captain in 1836.

In 1827, Cooper married Sarah Maria Mason, granddaughter of Declaration of Independence signer George Mason and sister of future Confederate diplomat James M. Mason. Sarah's sister, Ann Maria Mason, was the mother of Confederate cavalry general Fitzhugh Lee, a nephew of Robert E. Lee, while her brother John Mason, was a son-in-law of Gen. Alexander Macomb. Cooper served as aide-de-camp for Gen. Macomb from 1828 to 1836 and, under his supervision, received credit for the publication of A Concise System of Instructions and Regulations for the Militia and Volunteers of the United States. (Although published under the byline "Prepared and Arranged by Brevet Captain S. Cooper," it was actually a translation of a French military manual which had been initially translated by Brevet Major General Winfield Scott, who was not acknowledged in the text at all; Cooper had only edited Scott's translation.)

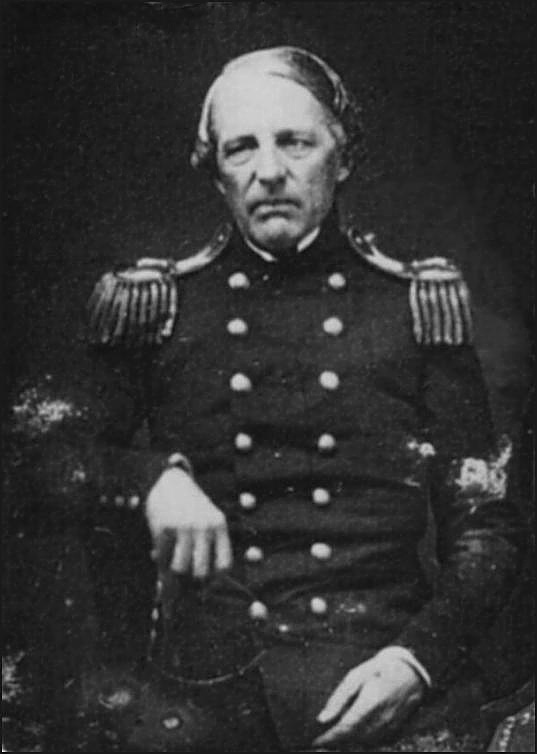
Cooper in the U.S. Army

Cooper served in numerous artillery units until 1837 when he was appointed chief clerk of the U.S. War Department. In 1838 he received a brevet promotion to major and was appointed assistant adjutant general of the Army. Nine years later, with a brevet as lieutenant colonel, he served in the same capacity.

Cooper's service in the Second Seminole War of 1841–42 was a rare departure for him from Washington, D.C. He was chief of staff for Col. William J. Worth. After hostilities ended, he returned to staff duty in Washington from 1842 to 1845. Cooper received a brevet promotion to colonel on May 30, 1848, for his War Department service in the Mexican–American War, and was promoted to the permanent rank of colonel in the regular army and appointed the army's Adjutant General on July 15, 1852. Cooper also served very briefly as acting U.S. Secretary of War in 1857.

Cooper was also a slaveowner: at the time of the 1850 census, he had six slaves. On February 5, 1857, his daughter Sarah Maria Mason Cooper (August 4, 1836 – December 15, 1858) married Frank Wheaton, who became a Union Army general during the American Civil War. They had one child, Sarah Maria Cooper Wheaton, in 1858.

== American Civil War service ==
Cooper joined the Confederacy at the beginning of the American Civil War. His wife's family was from Virginia, and he had a close friendship with Jefferson Davis, who had also been U.S. Secretary of War. One of his last official acts as Adjutant General of the U.S. Army was to sign an order dismissing Brig. Gen. David E. Twiggs from the army. Twiggs had surrendered his command and supplies in Texas to the Confederacy (and was shortly after that made a Confederate major general.) This order was dated March 1, 1861, and Cooper resigned six days later. He traveled to Montgomery, Alabama, at the time the Confederacy's capital, to join the Confederate States Army.

On reaching Montgomery, Cooper was immediately given a commission as a brigadier general on March 16, 1861. He served as both Adjutant General and Inspector General of the Confederate Army, a post he held until the end of the war. Cooper provided much-needed organization and knowledge to the fledgling Confederate War Department, drawing on his years performing duties as Adjutant General of the U.S. Army.

On May 16, 1861, Cooper was promoted to full general in the Confederate Army. He was one of five men promoted to the grade at that time and one of only seven during the war, but with the earliest date of rank. Thus, despite his relative obscurity today, he outranked the better-known confederates Albert Sidney Johnston, Robert E. Lee, Joseph E. Johnston, and P. G. T. Beauregard. Cooper reported directly to Confederate President Jefferson Davis. At the war's end in 1865, Cooper surrendered and was paroled on May 3 at Charlotte, North Carolina.

While building defenses near Washington, D.C., Union forces demolished his home and used its bricks to build a fort dubbed "Traitor's Hill" in dishonor of Cooper.

== Postbellum life ==
Cooper's last official act for the Confederacy was to preserve the official records of the Confederate Army and turn them over intact to the United States government, where they form a part of the Official Records, The War of the Rebellion: a Compilation of the Official Records of the Union and Confederate Armies, published starting in 1880. Military historians have highly regarded Cooper for this action. Historian Ezra J. Warner believed that in doing so Cooper was "thereby making a priceless contribution to the history of the period."

After the war, Cooper was a farmer at his home, Cameron, near Alexandria, Virginia. His house had been taken over by the U.S. government during the war and turned into a fort, but he was able to move into what had been an overseer's house. Due to his age, Cooper earned a meager living. On August 4, 1870, Robert E. Lee, on behalf of other former Confederates, sent Cooper $300 (~$7,638 in 2025). Lee wrote to him saying, "To this sum I have only been able to add $100, but I hope it may enable you to supply some immediate want and prevent you from taxing your strength too much." Samuel Cooper died at his home in 1876 and is buried in Alexandria's Christ Church Episcopal Cemetery.

== Selected works ==
- A Concise System of Instructions and Regulations for the Militia and Volunteers of the United States. Philadelphia: Robert P. Desilver. 1836. Prepared and Arranged by Brevet Captain S. Cooper, Aide de Camp and Assistant Adjutant General. Under the Supervision of Major General Alexander Macomb, Commanding the Army of the United States.

== See also ==
- List of American Civil War generals (Confederate)

== Notes ==
Military offices
Preceded by Roger Jones	Adjutant General of the U. S. Army; July 15, 1852 – March 7, 1861	Succeeded by Lorenzo Thomas
