= General officers in the Confederate States Army =

Senior military leaders of the Confederate States of America

Confederate States Army general officers collar badge

The general officers of the Confederate States Army (CSA) were the senior military leaders of the Confederate States of America during the American Civil War of 1861–1865. They were often former officers from the United States Army (the regular army) before the Civil War, while others were given the rank based on merit or when necessity demanded. Most Confederate generals needed confirmation from the Confederate States Congress, much like prospective generals in the modern U.S. armed forces.

Like all of the Confederacy's military forces, these generals answered to their civilian leadership, in particular Jefferson Davis, the president of the Confederate States of America and therefore commander-in-chief of the military forces of the Confederate States.

== History ==
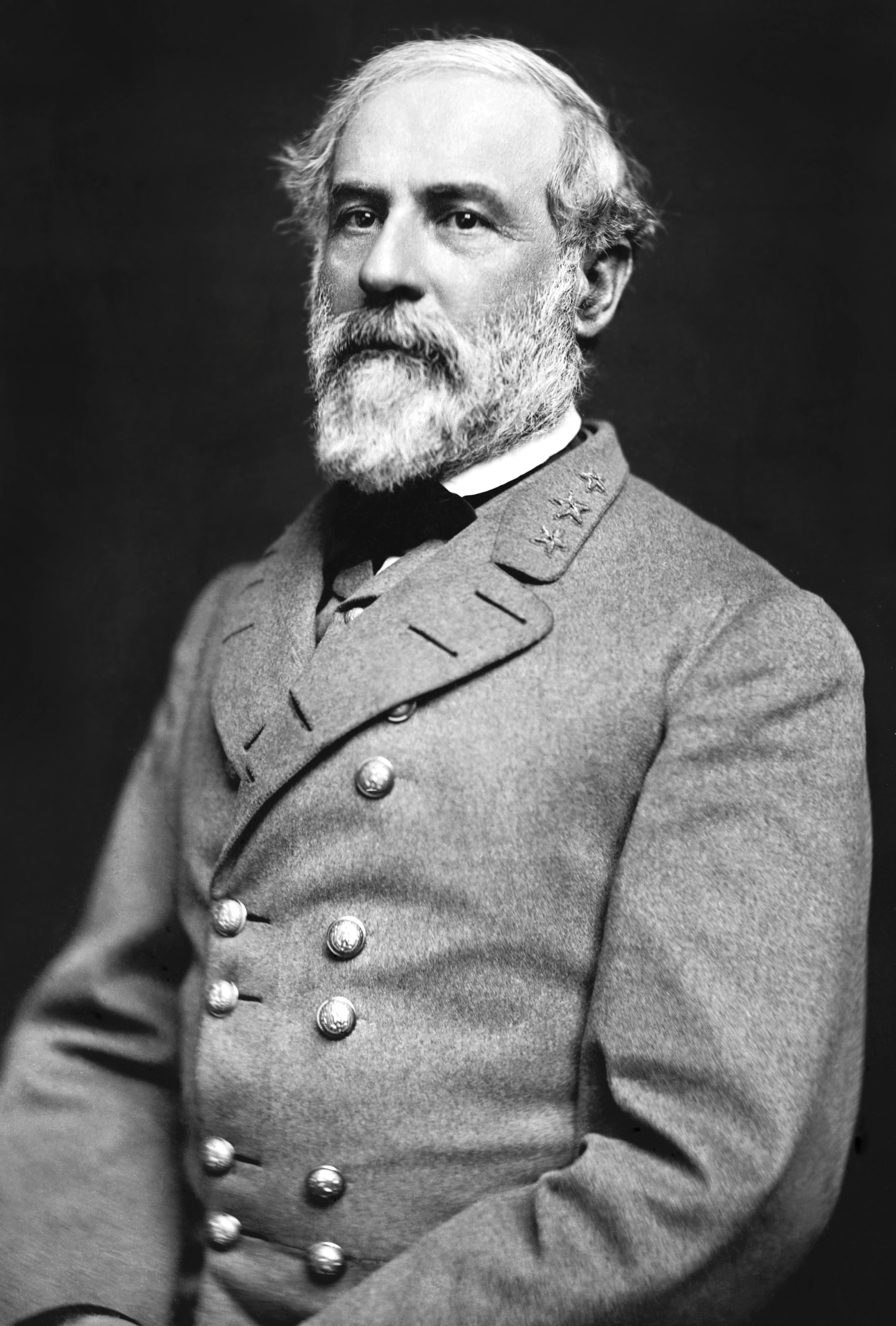
Robert E. Lee, the best known CSA general. Lee is shown with the insignia of a Confederate colonel, which he chose to wear throughout the war.

Much of the design of the Confederate States Army was based on the structure and customs of the United States Army when the Confederate States Congress established the Confederate States War Department on February 21, 1861. The Confederate States Army was composed of three parts; the Army of the Confederate States of America (ACSA, intended to be the permanent, regular army), the Provisional Army of the Confederate States (PACS, or "volunteer" Army, to be disbanded after hostilities), and the various state militias.

Graduates from United States Military Academy and Mexican–American War veterans were highly sought after by Jefferson Davis for military service, especially as general officers. Like their U.S. Army counterparts, the Confederate Army had both professional and political generals within it. Ranks throughout the CSA were roughly based on the U.S. Army in design and seniority. On February 27, 1861, a general staff for the army was authorized, consisting of four positions: an adjutant general, a quartermaster general, a commissary general, and a surgeon general. Initially, the last of these was to be a staff officer only. The post of adjutant general was filled by Samuel Cooper (the position he had held as a colonel in the U.S. Army from 1852 until resigning) and he held it throughout the Civil War, as well as the army's inspector general.

Initially, the Confederate States Army commissioned only brigadier generals in both the volunteer and regular services; however, the Congress quickly passed legislation allowing for the appointment of major generals as well as generals, thus providing clear and distinct seniority over the existing major generals in the various state militias. On May 16, 1861, when there were only five officers at the grade of brigadier general, this legislation was passed, which stated in part:

That the five general officers provided by existing laws for the Confederate States shall have the rank and denomination of 'general', instead of 'brigadier-general', which shall be the highest military grade known to the Confederate States ...

As of September 18, 1862, when lieutenant generals were authorized, the Confederate States Army had four grades of general officers; they were (in order of increasing rank) brigadier general, major general, lieutenant general, and general. As officers were appointed to the various grades of general by Jefferson Davis (and were confirmed), he would create the promotion lists himself. The dates of rank, as well as seniority of officers appointed to the same grade on the same day, were determined by Davis, "usually following the guidelines established for the prewar U.S. Army."

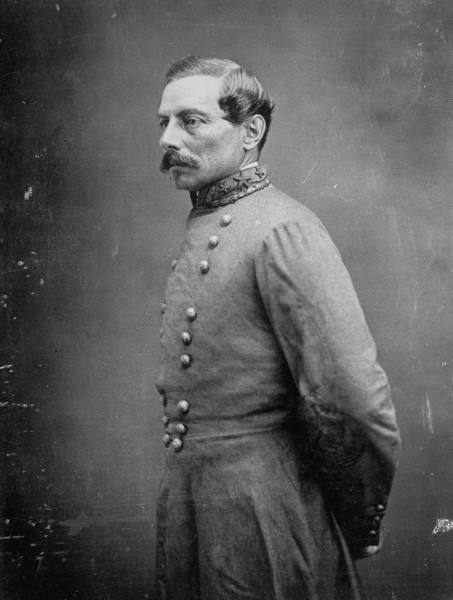
P. G. T. Beauregard, the Confederacy's first brigadier general, later the fifth-ranking general

== Brigadier general ==
These generals were most often infantry or cavalry brigade commanders, aides to other higher-ranking generals, and War Department staff officers. By the war's end, the Confederacy had at least 383 different men who held this rank in the PACS and three in the ACSA: Samuel Cooper, Robert E. Lee, and Joseph E. Johnston. The Confederate States Congress authorized the organization of regiments into brigades on March 6, 1861. Brigadier generals commanded them, and these generals were nominated by Davis and confirmed by the Confederate Senate.

Though close to the U.S. Army in assignments, Confederate brigadiers mainly commanded brigades, while U.S. brigadiers sometimes led divisions and brigades, particularly in the first years of the war. These generals also often led sub-districts within military departments, with command over soldiers in their sub-district. These generals outranked Confederate States Army colonels, who commonly led infantry regiments.

This rank was equivalent to brigadier general in the modern U.S. Army.

== Major general ==
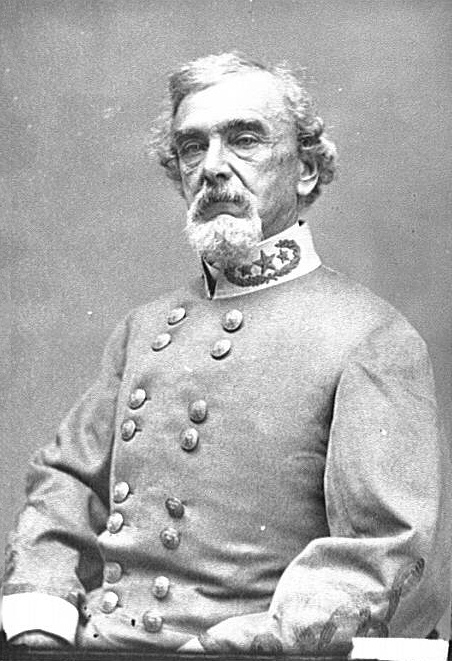
Maj. Gen. Benjamin Huger, CSA

These generals were most commonly infantry division commanders, aides to other higher-ranking generals, and War Department staff officers. They also led the districts that made up military departments and had command over the troops in their districts. Some Major generals also led smaller military departments. By the end of the war, the Confederacy had at least 88 men who had held this rank, all in the PACS.

The Confederate States Congress authorized divisions on March 6, 1861, and major generals would command them. These generals were to be nominated by Davis and confirmed by the Confederate Senate. Major generals outranked brigadiers and all other lesser officers.

This rank was not synonymous with use in the U.S. Army, where major generals led divisions, corps, and entire armies. This rank was equivalent in most respects to a major general in the modern U.S. Army.

=== Major generals by seniority ===
Not further promoted

- Abbreviations: KIA = killed in action, MW = mortally wounded, NC = non-combat death

List of major generals by seniority
Name	Date of rank	Rank terminated	Reason
David E. Twiggs	May 22, 1861	October 11, 1861	retired
Earl Van Dorn	September 19, 1861	May 8, 1863	murdered, Spring Hill, TN
Gustavus W. Smith	September 19, 1861	February 17, 1863	resigned
Benjamin Huger	October 7, 1861	June 12, 1865	paroled
John B. Magruder	October 7, 1861	no record	no record
Mansfield Lovell	October 7, 1861	no record	no record
George B. Crittenden	November 9, 1861	October 23, 1862	resigned
William W. Loring	February 15, 1862	May 1, 1865	paroled
Sterling Price	March 6, 1862	no record	no record
Benjamin F. Cheatham	March 10, 1862	May 1, 1865	paroled
Samuel Jones	March 10, 1862	May 12, 1865	paroled
John P. McCown	March 10, 1862	May 12, 1865	paroled
Daniel Harvey Hill	March 26, 1862	no record	no record
Jones M. Withers	April 6, 1862	May 11, 1865	paroled
John C. Breckinridge	April 14, 1862	no record	no record
Thomas C. Hindman	April 14, 1862	no record	no record
Lafayette McLaws	May 23, 1862	no record	no record
Richard H. Anderson	July 14, 1862	no record	no record
J.E.B. Stuart	July 25, 1862	May 12, 1864	MW, Battle of Yellow Tavern
Samuel G. French	August 31, 1862	April 1865	paroled
George Pickett	October 10, 1862	April 9, 1865	paroled
Carter L. Stevenson	October 10, 1862	May 1, 1865	paroled
David R. Jones	October 11, 1862	January 15, 1863	NC, Richmond, VA
John H. Forney	October 27, 1862	June 20, 1865	paroled
Dabney H. Maury	November 4, 1862	May 11, 1865	paroled
Martin Luther Smith	November 4, 1862	May 1865	paroled
John G. Walker	November 8, 1862	no record	no record
Arnold Elzey	December 4, 1862	May 9, 1865	paroled
Patrick Cleburne	December 13, 1862	Nov 30, 1864	KIA, Battle of Franklin
Franklin Gardner	December 13, 1862	May 11, 1865	paroled
Isaac R. Trimble	January 17, 1863	April 16, 1865	paroled
Jubal Early	January 17, 1863	no record	no record
Daniel S. Donelson	January 17, 1863	April 17, 1863	NC, Knoxville, TN
Joseph Wheeler	January 20, 1863	June 9, 1865	paroled
W.H.C. Whiting	February 28, 1863	March 10, 1865	NC, New York City
Edward Johnson	February 28, 1863	July 22, 1865	paroled
Robert E. Rodes	May 2, 1863	September 19, 1864	KIA, Third Battle of Winchester
W.H.T. Walker	May 23, 1863	July 22, 1864	KIA, Battle of Atlanta
Henry Heth	May 24, 1863	April 9, 1865	paroled
John S. Bowen	May 25, 1863	July 6, 1863	Died with Rank unconfirmed
Robert Ransom, Jr.	May 26, 1863	no record	no record
Dorsey Pender	May 27, 1863	July 18, 1863	MW, Battle of Gettysburg
Cadmus M. Wilcox	August 3, 1863	April 9, 1865	paroled
Jeremy F. Gilmer	August 3, 1863	no record	no record, assignment incomplete
Fitzhugh Lee	August 3, 1863	April 9, 1865	paroled
William Smith	August 12, 1863	January 1, 1864	resigned
Howell Cobb	September 9, 1863	May 18, 1865	paroled
John A. Wharton	November 10, 1863	April 6, 1865	murdered, Houston, TX
William T. Martin	November 10, 1863	May 11, 1865	paroled
Charles W. Field	February 14, 1864	April 9, 1865	paroled
J. Patton Anderson	February 17, 1865	May 1, 1865	paroled
William B. Bate	February 24, 1864	May 1, 1865	paroled
Prince de Polignac	April 8, 1864	no record	no record
Robert F. Hoke	April 20, 1864	April 1, 1865	paroled
W.H.F. Lee	April 23, 1864	April 9, 1865	paroled
James F. Fagan	April 24, 1864	June 20, 1865	Temporary promotion, paroled
John B. Gordon	May 14, 1864	April 9, 1865	paroled
Joseph B. Kershaw	May 18, 1864	no record	no record
Bushrod Johnson	May 21, 1863	May 9, 1865	paroled
Stephen D. Ramseur	June 1, 1864	June 20, 1865	Temporary promotion, MW, Battle of Cedar Creek
Edward C. Walthall	June 6, 1864	no record	Temporary promotion, no record
Henry Clayton	July 1, 1864	April 1865	Temporary promotion, resigned
William Mahone	July 30, 1864	April 9, 1865	paroled
John C. Brown	August 4, 1864	May 2, 1865	Temporary promotion, paroled
Lunsford L. Lomax	August 10, 1864	May 2, 1865	Temporary promotion, paroled
Matthew C. Butler	September 9, 1864	May 1, 1865	paroled
James L. Kemper	September 9, 1864	May 2, 1865	paroled
G.W.C. Lee	October 20, 1864	April 6, 1865	paroled
Thomas L. Rosser	November 1, 1864	May 1865	Temporary promotion, paroled
P.M.B. Young	December 12, 1864	no record	Temporary promotion, no record
Bryan Grimes	February 15, 1865	April 9, 1865	paroled
William W. Allen	March 4, 1865,	May 1865	Unconfirmed paroled
Thomas J. Churchill	March 17, 1865	June 7, 1865	Temporary promotion, paroled
John S. Marmaduke	March 18, 1865	July 24, 1865	paroled

Evander McIver Law was promoted to the rank of major general on March 20, 1865, on the recommendation of generals Johnston and Hampton just before the surrender. The promotion was too late to be confirmed by the Confederate Congress however.

== Lieutenant general ==
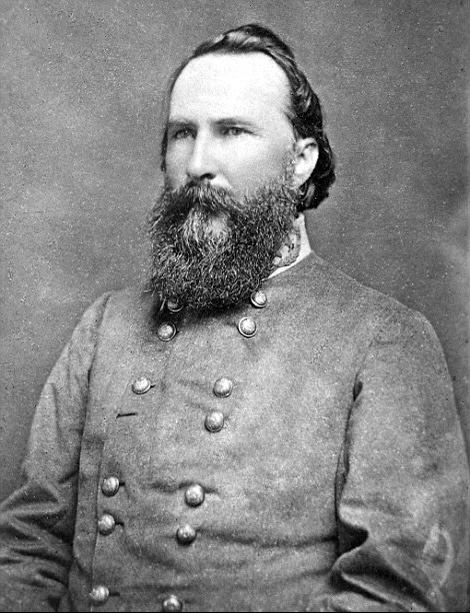
Lt. Gen. James Longstreet, CSA

The Confederate Army had 18 lieutenant generals, who were often corps commanders within armies or military department heads in charge of geographic sections and all soldiers in those boundaries. All Confederate lieutenant generals were in the PACS. The Confederate Congress legalized the creation of army corps on September 18, 1862, and directed that lieutenant generals lead them. These generals were to be nominated by President Davis and confirmed by the C.S. Senate. Lieutenant generals outranked major generals and all other lesser officers. Most were graduates of the United States Military Academy and were former officers in the United States Army, with the exceptions of Richard Taylor, Wade Hampton III, and Nathan Bedford Forrest.

This rank was not synonymous with the U.S. Army's use of it; Ulysses S. Grant (1822–1885) was one of only two U.S. lieutenant generals during the war; the other was Winfield Scott (1786–1866), General-in-Chief of the United States Army 1841–1861, at the beginning of the American Civil War who also served in the War of 1812 (1812–1815), and led an army in the field during the Mexican–American War (1846–1848), received a promotion to brevet lieutenant general by a special Act of Congress in 1855. Gen. Grant was the only U.S. Army lieutenant general in active service at the time of his promotion on March 9, 1864. Grant became General-in-Chief, commander of the United States Army ("Union Army"), answering directly to President Abraham Lincoln and charged with the task of leading the U.S. Army to victory over the Confederate Army. The CSA lieutenant general rank is also roughly equivalent to lieutenant general in the modern U.S. Army.

The Confederate Congress passed legislation in May 1864 to allow for "temporary" generals in the PACS, to be appointed by President Jefferson Davis and confirmed by the Confederate Senate and given a non-permanent command by Davis. Under this law, Davis appointed several officers to fill open positions. Richard H. Anderson was appointed a "temporary" lieutenant general on May 31, 1864, and given command of the First Corps in the Army of Northern Virginia commanded by Gen. Lee (following the wounding of Lee's second-in-command, Lt. Gen. James Longstreet on May 6 in the Battle of the Wilderness.) With Longstreet's return that October, Anderson reverted to a major general. Jubal Early was appointed a "temporary" lieutenant general on May 31, 1864, and given command of the Second Corps (following the reassignment of Lt. Gen. Richard S. Ewell to other duties) and led the Corps as an army into the third Confederate attack on the United States in July 1864 during the Battle of Monocacy near Frederick, Maryland and the Battle of Fort Stevens outside the U.S. capital city, Washington, D.C., until December 1864, when he too reverted to a major general. Likewise, both Stephen D. Lee and Alexander P. Stewart were appointed to fill vacancies in the Western Theater as "temporary" lieutenant generals and also reverted to their prior grades as major generals as those assignments ended. However, Lee was nominated a second time for lieutenant general on March 11, 1865.

=== Lieutenant generals by seniority ===
- KIA = killed in action, MW = mortally wounded

List of lieutenant generals by seniority
Name	Date of Rank	Nominated	Confirmed	Rank Terminated	Reason
James Longstreet	October 9, 1862	October 10, 1862	October 11, 1862	April 9, 1865	paroled
Edmund Kirby Smith	October 9, 1862	October 10, 1862	October 11, 1862	February 19, 1864	promoted to general
Leonidas Polk	October 10, 1862	October 10, 1862	October 11, 1862	June 14, 1864	KIA, Pine Mountain
Theophilus H. Holmes	October 10, 1862	October 10, 1862	October 11, 1862	May 1, 1865	paroled
William J. Hardee	October 10, 1862	October 10, 1862	October 11, 1862	May 1, 1865	paroled
Stonewall Jackson	October 10, 1862	October 10, 1862	October 11, 1862	May 10, 1863	MW, Chancellorsville
John C. Pemberton	October 10, 1862	October 10, 1862	October 13, 1862	May 18, 1864	resigned
Richard S. Ewell	May 23, 1863	May 23, 1863	February 2, 1864	July 19, 1865	paroled
A. P. Hill	May 24, 1863	May 23, 1863	January 15, 1864	April 2, 1865	KIA, Petersburg
Daniel Harvey Hill	July 11, 1863	?	withdrawn	October 15, 1863	Rift with General Bragg after the Battle of Chattanooga
John Bell Hood	September 20, 1863	February 1, 1864	February 4, 1864	May 31, 1865	paroled
Richard Taylor	April 8, 1864	May 14, 1864	May 16, 1864	May 11, 1865	paroled
Jubal Early	May 31, 1864	May 31, 1864	May 31, 1864	no record	Temporary Rank
Richard H. Anderson	May 31, 1864	May 31, 1864	May 31, 1864	no record	Temporary Rank
Alexander P. Stewart	June 23, 1864	June 23, 1864	February 20, 1865	May 1, 1865	paroled
Stephen D. Lee	June 23, 1864	March 11, 1865	March 16, 1865	May 1, 1865	paroled
Simon Bolivar Buckner	September 20, 1864	September 20, 1864	January 17, 1865	June 9, 1865	paroled
Wade Hampton III	February 14, 1865	February 14, 1865	February 15, 1865	no record	no record
Nathan Bedford Forrest	February 28, 1865	March 2, 1865	March 2, 1865	May 10, 1865	paroled

== General ==
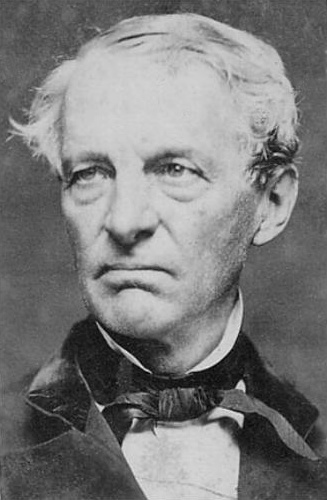
Gen. Samuel Cooper, CSA

Originally five officers in the Confederate States Army were appointed to the rank of general, and only two more would follow. These generals occupied the senior posts in the Confederate Army, mostly entire army or military department commanders and advisers to Jefferson Davis. This rank was equivalent to the general in the modern U.S. Army. The grade is often referred to in modern writings as "full general" to help differentiate it from the generic term "general", meaning simply "general officer".

All Confederate generals were enrolled in the ACSA to ensure that they outranked all militia officers, except for Edmund Kirby Smith, who was appointed general late in the war and into the PACS. Pierre G.T. Beauregard, had also initially been appointed a PACS general, was elevated to ACSA two months later with the same date of rank. These generals outranked all other grades of generals and lesser officers in the Confederate States Army. All were graduates of the United States Military Academy and were former officers in the United States Army.

The first group of officers appointed to general was Samuel Cooper, Albert Sidney Johnston, Robert E. Lee, Joseph E. Johnston, and Pierre G.T. Beauregard, with their seniority in that order. This ordering caused Cooper, a staff officer who would not see combat, to be the senior general officer in the CSA. That seniority strained the relationship between Joseph E. Johnston and Jefferson Davis. Johnston considered himself the senior officer in the Confederate States Army and resented the ranks that President Davis had authorized. However, his previous position in the U.S. Army was staff, not line, which was a criterion for Davis regarding establishing seniority and rank in the subsequent Confederate States Army.

On February 17, 1864, the Confederate Congress passed legislation to allow President Davis to appoint an officer to command the Trans-Mississippi Department in the Far West, with the rank of general in the PACS. Edmund Kirby Smith was the only officer appointed to this position. Braxton Bragg was appointed a general in the ACSA with a date of rank of April 6, 1862, the day his commanding officer Gen. Albert Sidney Johnston died in combat at Shiloh/Pittsburg Landing.

The Confederate Congress passed legislation in May 1864 to allow for "temporary" general officers in the PACS, to be appointed by Davis and confirmed by the C.S. Senate and given a non-permanent command by Davis. John Bell Hood was appointed a "temporary" general on July 18, 1864, the date he took command of the Army of Tennessee in the Atlanta campaign, but the Congress did not later confirm this appointment, and he reverted to his rank of lieutenant general in January 1865. Later in March 1865, shortly before the end of the war, Hood's status was spelled out by the Confederate States Senate, which stated:

Resolved, That General J. B. Hood, having been appointed General, with temporary rank and command, and having been relieved from duty as Commander of the Army of Tennessee, and not having been reappointed to any other command appropriate to the rank of General, he has lost the rank of General, and therefore cannot be confirmed as such.

=== Generals by seniority ===
- Abbreviations: KIA = killed in action

List of generals by seniority
Name	Date of rank	Nominated	Confirmed	Rank terminated	Reason
Samuel Cooper	May 16, 1861	August 31, 1861	August 31, 1861	May 3, 1865	paroled
Albert Sidney Johnston	May 30, 1861	August 31, 1861	August 31, 1861	April 6, 1862	KIA, Shiloh
Robert E. Lee	June 14, 1861	August 31, 1861	August 31, 1861	April 9, 1865	paroled
Joseph E. Johnston	July 4, 1861	August 31, 1861	August 31, 1861	May 2, 1865	paroled
P. G. T. Beauregard	July 21, 1861	August 31, 1861	August 31, 1861	May 1, 1865	paroled
Braxton Bragg	April 6, 1862	April 12, 1862	April 12, 1862	May 10, 1865	paroled
Edmund Kirby Smith	August 21, 1862	February 19, 1864	May 11, 1864	May 17, 1865	paroled
John Bell Hood	July 18, 1864	-	-	January 23, 1865	Temporary rank

During 1863, Beauregard, Cooper, J. Johnston, and Lee all had their ranks re-nominated on February 20 and then re-confirmed on April 23 by the Confederate Congress. This was in response to debates on February 17 about whether confirmations made by the provisional legislature needed re-confirmation by the permanent legislature, which was done by an Act of Congress issued two days later.

== General in Chief ==
The position of General in Chief of the Armies of the Confederate States was created on January 23, 1865. Gen. Robert E. Lee, the only officer appointed to it, served from February 6 until April 12.

== Militia generals ==
The Confederate states had maintained militias since the American Revolutionary War, consistent with the U.S. Militia Act of 1792. They went by various names such as state "militia", "armies", or "guard" and were activated and expanded when the Civil War began. These units were commanded by "militia generals" to defend their particular state and sometimes did not leave the state to fight for the Confederate Army. The Confederate militias used the brigadier and major general officer ranks.

The regulations in the act of 1792 provided for two classes of militia, divided by age. Class one included men from 22 to 30 years old, and class two consisted of men from 18 to 20 years and from 31 to 45 years old. The various Confederate states used this system during the war.

== Uniform insignia ==
All Confederate generals wore the same uniform insignia regardless of their general rank, except for Robert E. Lee, who wore the uniform of a Confederate colonel, as well as Joseph E. Johnston who wore a Colonel's insignia with a larger six pointed star in the center, similar to the stars worn by George Washington during the American Revolution. Wade Hampton additionally wore shoulder straps with general stars to denote his specific general's rank, and was apparently the only Confederate general to ever do so. The only visible difference was the button groupings on their uniforms; groups of three buttons for lieutenant and major generals and two for brigadier generals. In either case, a general's buttons were also distinguished from other ranks by their eagle insignia.

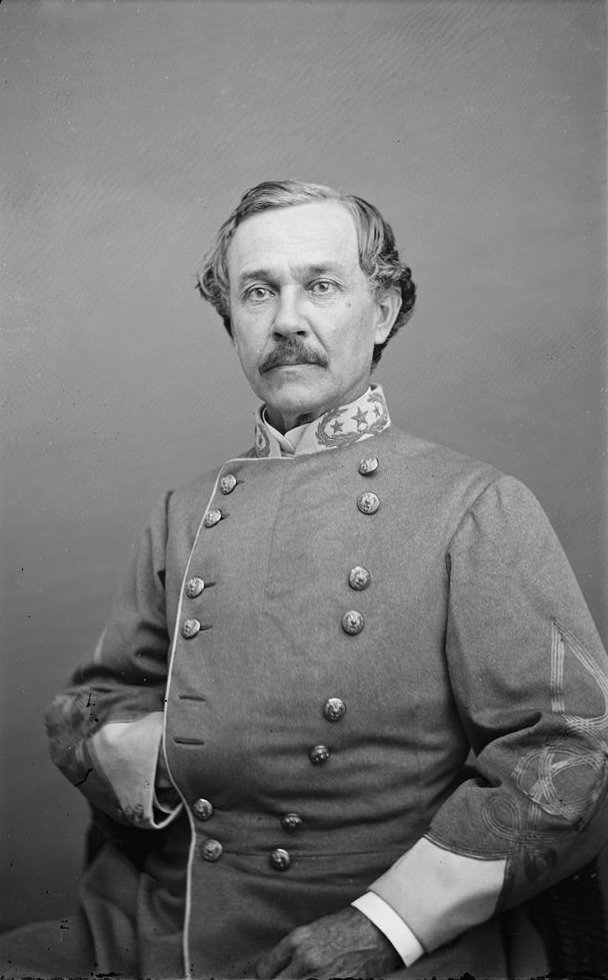
Joseph Reid Anderson in a CSA brigadier general's uniform.

Rank	Collar insignia	Sleeve insignia	Buttons
General	(all grades)	(all grades)
Lieutenant general	(all grades)	(all grades)	Groups of three buttons
Major general	(all grades)	(all grades)	Groups of three buttons
Brigadier general	(all grades)	(all grades)	Groups of two buttons

To the right is a picture of the CSA general's full uniform, in this case, of Brigadier General Joseph R. Anderson of the Confederate Bureau of Ordnance. All of the Confederate generals wore uniforms like this regardless of their general grade, and all with gold-colored embroidering.

== Pay ==
The general officers of the Confederate States Army were paid for their services, and exactly how much (in Confederate dollars (CSD)) depended on their rank and whether they held a field command or not. On March 6, 1861, when the army only contained brigadier generals, their pay was $301 CSD monthly, and their aide-de-camp lieutenants would receive an additional $35 CSD per month beyond regular pay. As more grades of the general officer were added, the pay scale was adjusted. By June 10, 1864, a general received $500 CSD monthly, plus another $500 CSD if they led an army in the field. Also, by that date, lieutenant generals got $450 CSD and major generals $350 CSD, and brigadiers would receive $50 CSD in addition to regular pay if they served in combat.

== Legacy ==
The Confederate States Army lost more general officers killed in combat than the United States Army throughout the war, in the ratio of about 5-to-1 for the Confederacy compared to roughly 12-to-1 for the United States. The most famous of them is General Thomas "Stonewall" Jackson, among the best-known Confederate commanders, after General Robert E. Lee. Jackson's death was the result of pneumonia which emerged subsequently after a friendly fire incident had occurred at the Battle of Chancellorsville on the night of May 2, 1863. Replacing these fallen generals was an ongoing problem during the war, often having men promoted beyond their abilities (a common criticism of officers such as John Bell Hood and George Pickett, but an issue for both armies), or gravely wounded in combat but needed, such as Richard S. Ewell. The problem was made more difficult by the Confederacy's depleting workforce, especially near the war's end.

The last Confederate general in the field, Stand Watie, surrendered on June 23, 1865, and the war's last surviving Confederate full general, Edmund Kirby Smith, died on March 28, 1893. James Longstreet died on January 2, 1904, and was considered "the last of the high command of the Confederacy".

The Confederate States Army's system of using four grades of general officers is currently the same rank structure used by the U.S. Army (in use since shortly after the Civil War) and is also the system used by the U.S. Marine Corps (in use since World War II).

== See also ==
- List of American Civil War generals (Union)
- List of American Civil War brevet generals (Union)
- List of American Civil War generals (Confederate)
- List of American Civil War generals (Acting Confederate)
- General officers in the United States
