= Wappingers Central School District =

School district in New York, United States

Address
- 25 Corporate Park Drive Hopewell Junction, New York, 12533; United States

District information
- Type: Public
- Grades: K–12
- NCES District ID: 3629880

Students and staff
- Students: 10,436
- Teachers: 732.07
- Staff: 960.91
- Student–teacher ratio: 14.26

Other information
- Website: www.wappingersschools.org

Wappingers Central School District (WCSD) is a school district headquartered in the town of East Fishkill, New York, on Corporate Park Drive.

== History ==
On November 30, 1937, in the southern portion of Dutchess County, New York, there was a meeting held to determine the consolidation of area school districts. The district was created after a September 1938 vote within all or portions of several communities in Dutchess and Putnam counties, including Wappinger, East Fishkill, Fishkill Town, and Poughkeepsie Town in Dutchess County and Kent and Philipstown in Putnam County, approved the establishment of the WCSD. Upon opening the district had attained 11 schools. In the 1950s the East Fishkill Number 6, Gayhead, Old Hopewell, Shenendoah, and Stormville school districts were consolidated into the Wappingers district.

== District boundary ==
Most of the district is in Dutchess County. Towns in the school district include Fishkill, Poughkeepsie, and Wappinger. Villages in the school district include East Fishkill, Fishkill, and Wappingers Falls. Census-designated places (hamlets) in the district include Brinckerhoff, Hillside Lake, Hopewell Junction, Merritt Park, Myers Corner, New Hackensack, New Hamburg, and portions of Crown Heights, Red Oaks Mill, and Spackenkill.

The district extends into Putnam County, with sections in Kent and Philipstown.

== Schools ==
=== High schools ===
- Roy C. Ketcham High School (Wappinger)
- John Jay High School (Hopewell Junction)

=== Junior high schools ===
- Van Wyck Junior High School (East Fishkill)
- Wappingers Junior High School (Wappinger)

=== Elementary schools ===
- Brinckerhoff (Fishkill)
- James S. Evans (Wappinger)
- Fishkill (Fishkill)
- Fishkill Plains (East Fishkill)
- Gayhead (Hopewell Junction)
- Kinry Road Elementary School (Poughkeepsie)
- Myers Corners Elementary School (Wappinger)
- Oak Grove Elementary School (Poughkeepsie)
- Sheafe Road Elementary School (Poughkeepsie)
- Vassar Road Elementary School (Poughkeepsie)

=== Alternative schools ===
- Orchard View Alternative High School (Hopewell Junction)
