= Wappinger, New York =

- Town
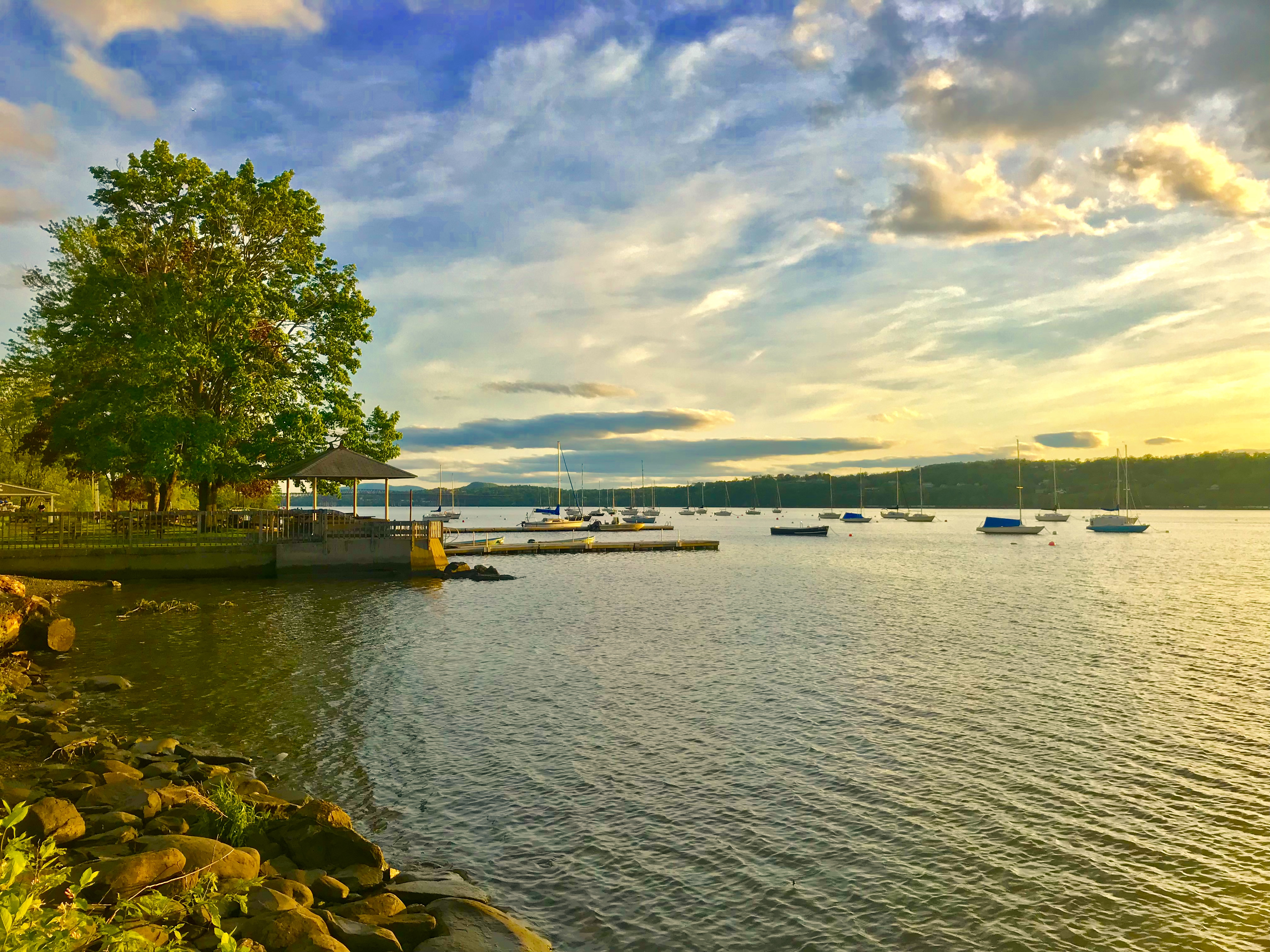
- Wappinger waterfront along the Hudson River

- Seal

- Location in Dutchess County and the state of New York
- Coordinates: 41°35′20″N 73°53′59″W
- Country: United States
- State: New York
- County: Dutchess
- Town of Wappinger: May 20, 1875

Government
  - Type: Town Council
  - Town Supervisor: Joseph D. Cavaccini (R)
  - Town Council: List: • W1: William H. Beale (R); • W2: Heather O’Dell (D); • W3: Christopher Phillips (R); • W4: Alfred J. Casella (R)

Area
  - Total: 28.53 sq mi (73.90 km^{2})
  - Land: 27.05 sq mi (70.07 km^{2})
  - Water: 1.48 sq mi (3.83 km^{2})
- Elevation: 197 ft (60 m)

Population (2020)
  - Total: 28,216
  - Density: 990/sq mi (382.2/km^{2})
- Time zone: UTC-5 (Eastern (EST))
  - Summer (DST): UTC-4 (EDT)
- ZIP code: 12590 (Wappingers Falls); 12512 (Chelsea); 12537 (Hughsonville); 12524 (Fishkill); 12533 (Hopewell Junction); 12603 (Poughkeepsie)
- Area code: 845
- FIPS code: 36-027-78157
- GNIS feature ID: 0979595
- Website: www.townofwappingerny.gov

Wappinger is a town in Dutchess County, New York, United States. The town is located in the Hudson River Valley region, on the eastern bank of the Hudson River. The population was 28,216 at the 2020 census. The name is derived from the Wappinger Native Americans who inhabited the area. Wappinger comprises three-fourths of the incorporated village of Wappingers Falls, several unincorporated hamlets such as Brinckerhoff, Chelsea, Diddell, Hughsonville, Middlebush, Myers Corner, New Hackensack, and Swartwoutville, and a number of neighborhoods.

== History ==
The Wappinger were a confederacy of Native Americans whose territory, in the 17th century, was spread along the eastern shore of the Hudson River. Primarily based in what is now Dutchess County, their territory bordered Manhattan Island to the south, the Mahican territory bounded by the Roeliff Jansen Kill to the north, and extended east into parts of Connecticut.

They spoke an eastern-Algonkian language. Culturally they were closely related to the Lenape people (Delaware Indians) to the west and south of Wappinger lands, and also related to the Mahican people to their immediate north and to the Indigenous peoples of Long Island. Wappinger means "easterner" in most Algonkian languages.

The town of Wappinger, originally a part of the town of Fishkill, was formed on May 20, 1875, and lies wholly within the limits of the historic Rombout Patent, granted in 1685. The geographical area of Wappinger was first illegally settled in 1659 by members of the Massachusetts Bay Colony. Seeking religious freedom, they settled near the mouth of the Wappinger Creek until Dutch Authorities removed them months later. It wasn't until 1685 when Francis Rombout and Gulian Verplanck were the first to legally purchase 85,000 acres from the Wappinger This would later be known as the Rombout Patent. The patent covered the towns of Fishkill, East Fishkill, Wappinger, the City of Beacon, and parts of LaGrange and Poughkeepsie, these municipalities were once all a part of the Town of Fishkill. Following the Rombout Patent, the first legal land purchase within the Town of Wappinger was in 1714 when Elias Van Benschoten purchased land and settled in the hamlet of New Hackensack. Following him were other families from Hackensack, New Jersey. The Town of Wappinger is made up of many small hamlets and communities and was primarily agricultural, while mills lined the creek in the Village of Wappingers Falls. Once the Town of Wappinger was officially created from the Town of Fishkill on May 20, 1875, it took another year to elect officials. The first meeting was held at the Brower Brother's Wagon Shop on Mill Street. The meetings of Town officials took place in the homes of the elected officials, whose jobs were mostly to maintain roadways and bridges.

=== Historic districts ===
- Wheeler Hill Historic District includes 49 contributing buildings, 15 contributing sites, and four contributing structures. It encompasses the estates of Obercreek, Elmhurst, Edge Hill, the former estates of Henry Suydam and William Crosby, and Carnwath Farms that were developed between 1740 and 1940. Also included are two 18th-century riverfront commercial structures, the Lent / Waldron Store, and Stone House at Farmer's Landing. Within this district, Wheeler Hill Road was once known as Rives Avenue or Hill, after Francis Rives who purchased the former Willis estate (Carnwath Farms) in 1870.

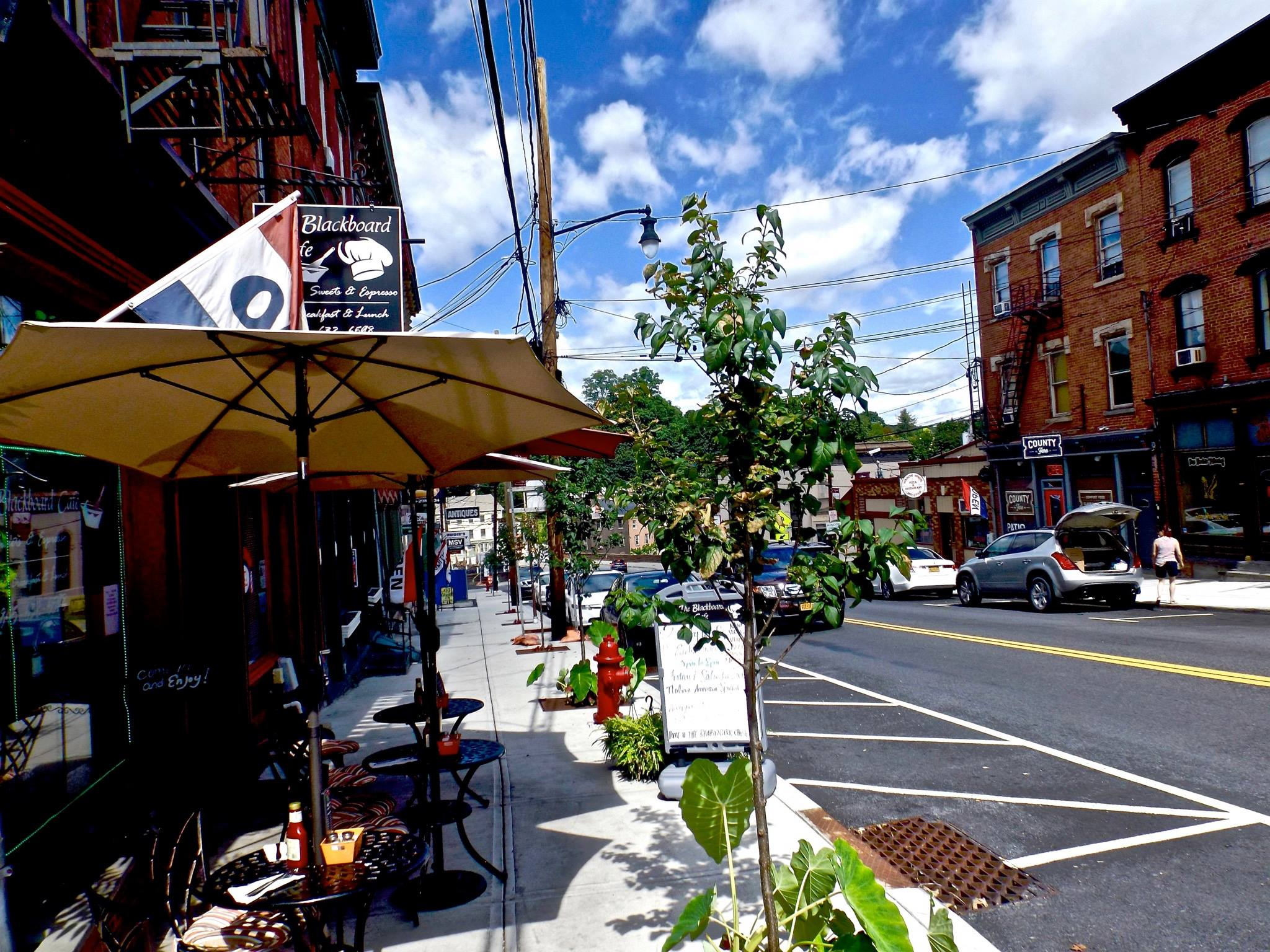
Village of Wappingers Falls Downtown Historic District

- The Wappingers Falls Historic District is in the center of the village of Wappingers Falls, and was added to the National Register of Historic Places in 1984. It is roughly centered along South Avenue, West Main Street and Wappinger Creek. It includes Mesier Park and many adjacent residential neighborhoods, roughly bounded by Elm, Park, Walker, Market and McKinley streets. Much of the district was built in the wake of the industrialization of Wappingers Falls in the 19th century, and its styles represent a cross-section of that century. The east and west sides of the village are connected by an 1884 stone arch bridge over the falls that replaced earlier wooden structures.

=== Hamlets ===
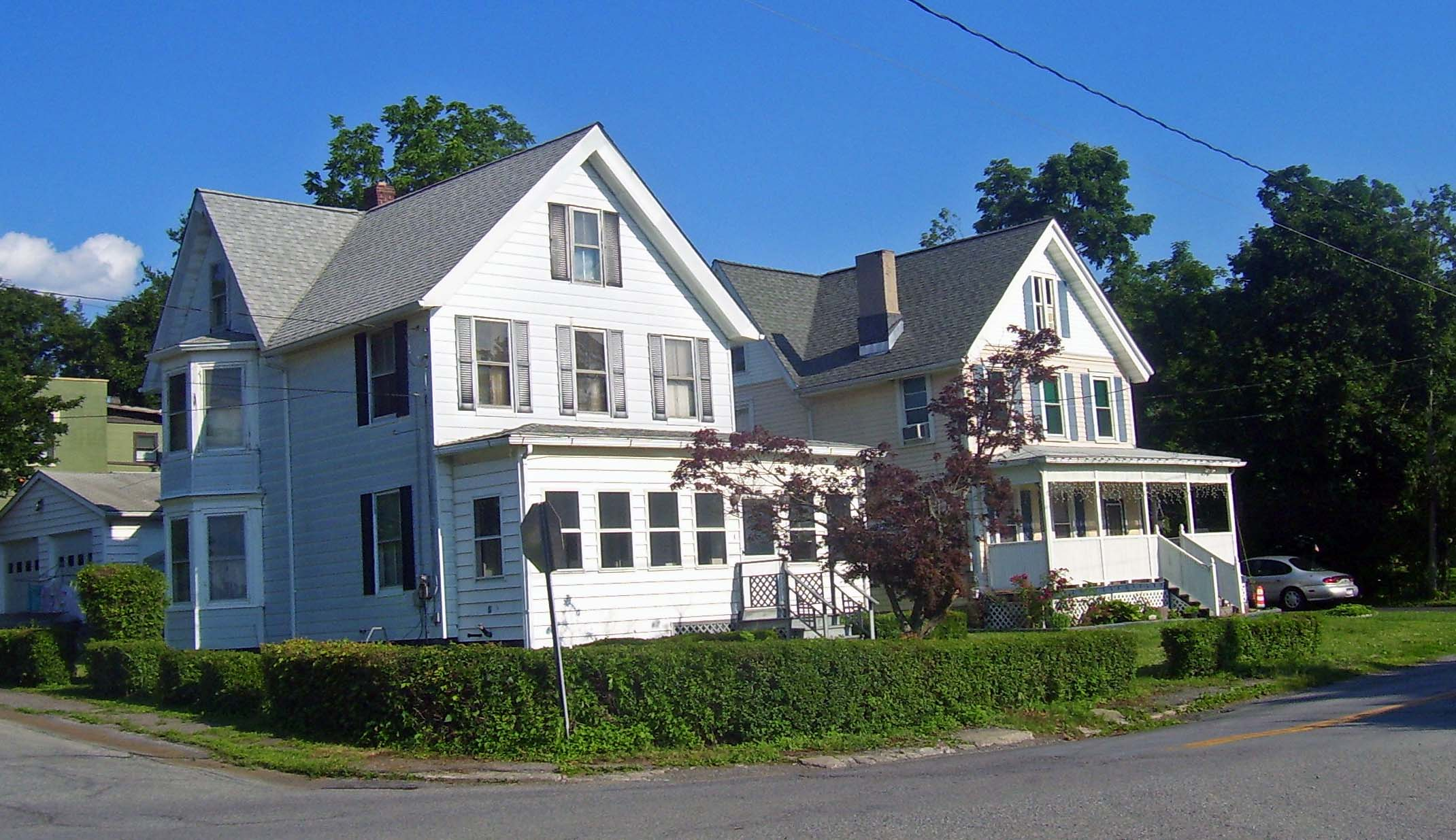
Downtown Chelsea

- Chelsea – A hamlet in the southwestern part of the town near the Hudson River, primarily residential. A marina is located on the river. In the northern section of the hamlet, there is a large pumping station used by the Delaware Aqueduct New York City water supply system during droughts to take water directly from the river. Chelsea was originally known as Low Point and derived its name from a low point of land extending into the river. It also served to distinguish it from the next hamlet north on the east bank of the river, once known as High Point, now New Hamburg. The hamlet was called Low Point until the completion of the Hudson River Railroad. At that time it was named Carthage. However, as mail was being misdirected to another Carthage in Jefferson County, it was renamed Carthage Landing. In 1901, when the railroad built a new station, the name became Chelsea. The hamlet's post office was established in 1840 as Low Point. The current post office was the former 1875 district school.
- Diddell was a hamlet in the northeastern section of the town, just east of New Hackensack. By the 1800s the Maybrook Railroad, which ran from Pawling to Poughkeepsie, established a station here. This rail line has since become the William R. Steinhaus Dutchess Rail Trail, with a trail-head at Diddell. In 2017 Governor Andrew Cuomo announced the creation of the 750-mile Empire State Trail that runs from Manhattan to Buffalo, which passes through the Diddell hamlet of Wappinger.
- Hughsonville – A hamlet situated one mile south of Wappingers Falls and which derives its name from William Hughson, one of four brothers who emigrated from England. Dr. Walter Hughson was born in Hughsonville on October 31, 1816. He became a successful surgeon in the county and died of consumption on December 9, 1857. The Presbyterian Church of Hughsonville was erected in 1840. A post office was established there in 1847. The Hughsonville Fire Company traces its date of establishment to 1912.
- Middlebush, situated approximately one mile south-east of Wappingers Falls, was an early business center. A post office was located there in 1824 that also served residents of Chelsea. The first Baptist church in the town was organized there in 1782. Abm. Van Wyck deeded the Society a piece of land for a site for a church and burying ground. The old cemetery remains, southeast of the intersection of Middlebush Road and Sgt. Palmateer Way (Old Route 9). In 1830, that meeting house became the property of the Methodist church, and was used by them as a house of worship until the present Methodist church in Wappingers Falls was erected in 1869, when it was taken down and the material used in the construction of the barn and sheds connected with that church. During the mid to late 19th century, Middlebush was known as Fowler House, named after Dr. Orson Fowler's octagon house that once stood on Route 9. This hamlet has two schools, businesses, housing, and the Wappinger Town Hall.
- Myers Corners, at the intersection of Myers Corners Road and All Angels Hill Road was named after John Myers of Holland and was mostly farm land but had a doctor, a school and a tavern.
- New Hackensack – Johannes Schurrie was an early settler in the town. He came from Hackensack, New Jersey, circa 1740, from which the hamlet derives its name. Most of the early settlers were of Dutch and German descent. A portion of NYS route 376 is known locally as New Hackensack Road. The Main Street was present day N.Y.S. Route 376 and had a post office and several stores until the widening of the Hudson Valley Regional Airport in the early-mid-1900s.
- Swartwoutville is located at the southeastern section of town. Named after General Jacobus Swartwout. Historically important meeting place during the American Revolution. In 1760, Swartwout purchased 3,000 acres of land from Madam Brett and built his first home after his wedding to Aaltje Brinkerhoff, of Brinkerhoff, New York.[11] General George Washington was staying in Fishkill in October 1778. The headquarters of the commander-in-chief was then in the home of Captain John Brinkerhoff, father-in-law to Jacobus Swartwout, in a low stone home about midway on the highway between the settlement of Brinkerhoff and Swartwoutville. During this period Prussian-American General, Baron Frederick William Augustus de Steuben, had his headquarters at the neighboring homestead of Colonel Jacobus Swartwout, standing immediately south of his later residence at Swartwoutville. Others who visited and quartered at Jacobus Swartwout's homestead along with General Washington and Baron Von Stueben were, Marquis de Lafayette and, Israel Putnam.

=== Toponyms ===
- All Angels' Hill – originally known as Mount Hope and then Underhill Road. In the 1850s, farmer William Marvin owned about 200 acres (81 ha) between the present Pye Lane and Myers Corners. His daughter Charlotte married New York doctor Anthony Underhill. In the mid-1800s, the Underhill family built a house on her father's land. Dr. Underhill died September 5, 1889. In 1903 the property was purchased by All Angels Episcopal Church in Manhattan as part of its ministry to the poor. The church maintained All Angels' Farm, a forerunner of the Fresh Air Fund.

== Government ==
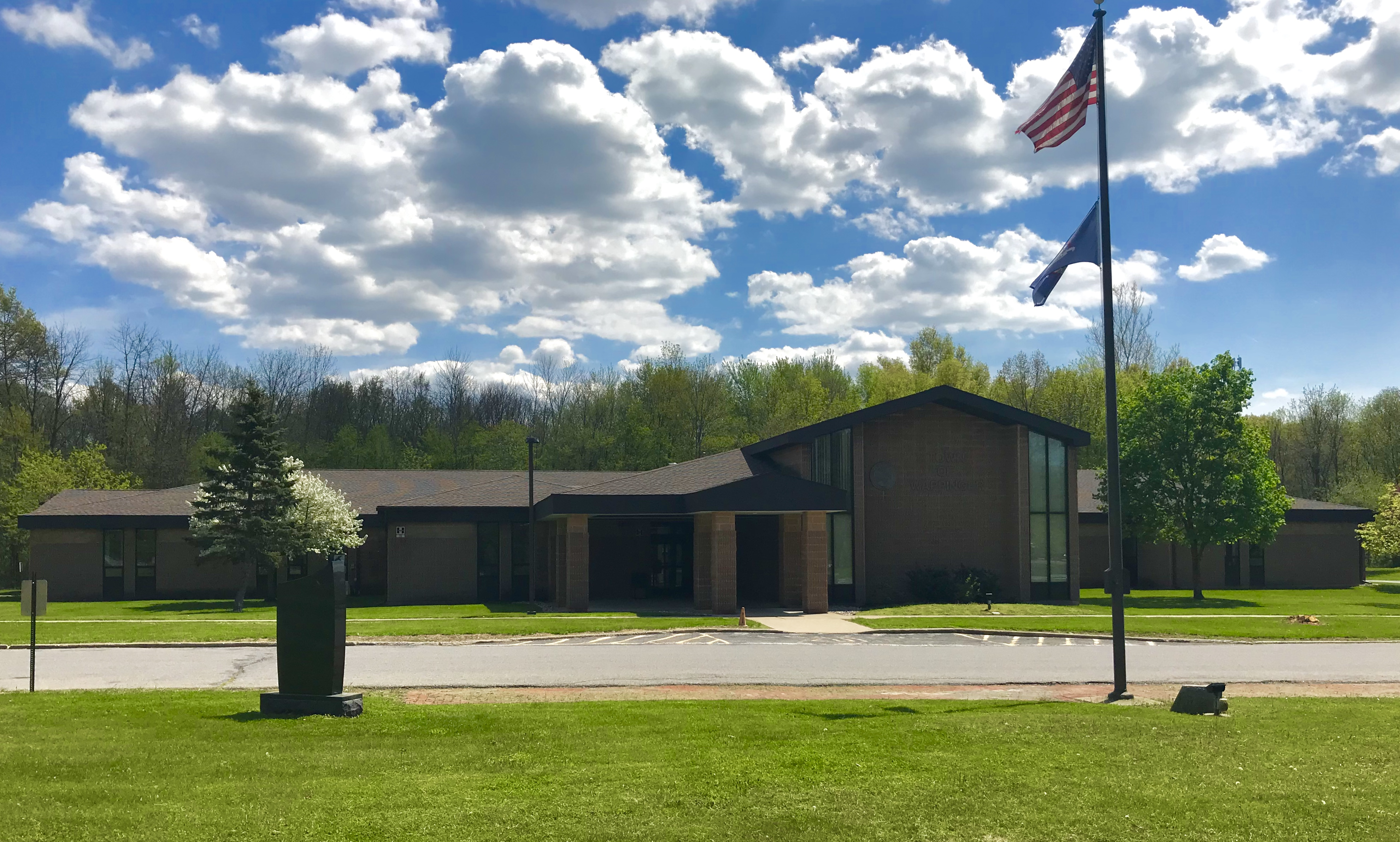
Wappinger Town Hall, located in the Middlebush hamlet

Wappinger is the second largest populated town in Dutchess County and is governed by a five-member Town Board. The Town of Wappinger has an elected Town Supervisor, who presides over Town Board meetings and is the chief financial and operating officer of the Town. The town is structured as a ward system with Town Council-members representing each of four wards.

- Ward 1 includes the Village of Wappingers Falls, northern US Route 9 corridor, Hughsonville hamlet, and Middlebush hamlet.
- Ward 2 consists of Chelsea hamlet, Swartwoutville hamlet, and the southern part of the U.S. 9 corridor.
- Ward 3 includes the middle of the town, including part of Myers Corners hamlet, Rockingham Farms, Quiet Acres, Wildwood, and Shamrock Hills subdivisions.
- Ward 4, which consists of New Hackensack hamlet, Myers Corners hamlet, Hudson Valley Regional Airport, and Edgehill Manor subdivision.

The Town of Wappinger has an elected Town Clerk, tasked with maintaining town records and taking minutes of Town Board meetings. The Highway Department is overseen by the elected Superintendent of Highways. The town has two Town Justices.

== Geography ==
According to the United States Census Bureau, the town has a total area of 28.5 square miles (73.9 km^{2}), of which 27.1 square miles (70.1 km^{2}) is land and 1.5 square miles (3.8 km^{2}), or 5.18%, is water. Part of the western town line is located at the Hudson River and borders Orange County.

Wappinger's boundaries are Fishkill to the south, East Fishkill across Sprout Creek to the east, the town of Newburgh across the Hudson River to the west, Wappinger Creek to the northwest, and LaGrange to the northeast. The town of Wappinger contains part of the village of Wappingers Falls, the other section of which is across Wappinger Creek in the town of Poughkeepsie.

The highest point in Wappinger is 545 feet (166 m) above sea level on a hilltop between Smithtown Road and Cedar Hill Road in the southern part of the town, and the lowest point is sea level, along the Hudson River.

== Demographics ==
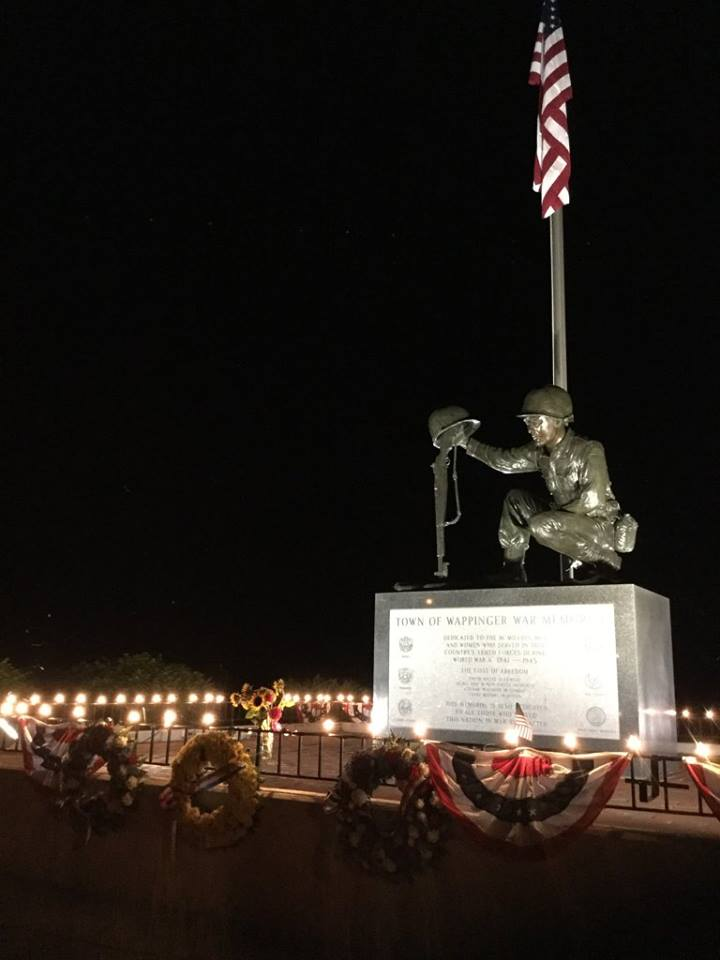
Town of Wappinger War Memorial at Brexel-Schlathaus Park

Historical population
Census	Pop.	Note	%±
1880	4,961		—
1890	4,575		−7.8%
1900	4,319		−5.6%
1910	3,813		−11.7%
1920	3,467		−9.1%
1930	4,083		17.8%
1940	4,345		6.4%
1950	5,090		17.1%
1960	9,577		88.2%
1970	22,040		130.1%
1980	26,776		21.5%
1990	26,008		−2.9%
2000	26,274		1.0%
2010	27,048		2.9%
2020	28,216		4.3%
U.S. Decennial Census

As of the census of 2000, there were 26,274 people, 9,793 households, and 6,992 families residing in the town. The population density was 963.3 inhabitants per square mile (371.9/km^{2}). There were 10,144 housing units at an average density of 371.9 per square mile (143.6/km^{2}). The racial makeup of the town was 86.18% White, 4.96% African American, 0.24% Native American, 4.29% Asian, 0.02% Pacific Islander, 2.44% from other races, and 1.88% from two or more races. Hispanic or Latino of any race were 7.87% of the population.

There were 9,793 households, out of which 34.3% had children under the age of 18 living with them, 58.1% were married couples living together, 9.4% had a female householder with no husband present, and 28.6% were non-families. 23.1% of all households were made up of individuals, and 6.2% had someone living alone who was 65 years of age or older. The average household size was 2.67 and the average family size was 3.17.

In the town 25.4% of the population was under the age of 18, 7.6% from 18 to 24, 32.5% from 25 to 44, 24.1% from 45 to 64, and 10.4% were 65 years of age or older. The median age was 36 years. For every 100 females, there were 98.8 males. For every 100 females age 18 and over, there were 96.2 males.

The median income for a household in the town was $58,079, and the median income for a family was $66,273. Males had a median income of $49,007 versus $31,444 for females. The per capita income for the town was $25,817. About 3.2% of families and 4.1% of the population were below the poverty line, including 4.1% of those under age 18 and 4.9% of those age 65 or over.

== Education ==
The Wappingers Central School District was formed in 1937 and is the second largest school district in the state. It was decided to close all of the one room school houses in the area and condense them into one centralized school. The first school in the Wappingers Central School District was the Wappingers Falls Junior High School, which was a K-12 school with students from the towns of Wappinger, Fishkill, Philipstown, Kent, East Fishkill, Lagrange, and Poughkeepsie. There are now 14 schools under the district's control: 9 primary, 2 junior high, and 3 high schools. Within Wappinger there are Myers Corners Elementary School, James S. Evans Elementary School, Wappingers Falls Junior High School, and Roy C. Ketcham Senior High School. The Randolph School is a private school and educates children grades K-6.

== Transportation ==
U.S. Route 9, NY 9D, New York State Route 82 and NY 376 pass through the town. Hudson Valley Regional Airport is located in Wappinger's New Hackensack hamlet. Dutchess County Public Transit buses also run through the town. Metro-North's Hudson Line tracks go through Wappinger, with the nearest stop being at New Hamburg.

== Notable people ==
- Tyler Adams, American soccer player for AFC Bournemouth in the English Premier League and the United States men's national soccer team. From the Swartwoutville area.
- Big Dan Brouthers, one of the first baseball sluggers, is in the Baseball Hall of Fame in Cooperstown, New York. He was from the village.
- Samuel Cooper, U.S. Army adjutant general; Confederate general during the American Civil War. From the New Hackensack area
- Alex Grey, artist. Lives in the Wheeler Hill Historic District
- George Lockhart Rives, United States Assistant Secretary of State, grew up at his parents' home Carnwath Farms
- Jacobus Swartwout, highest-ranking Revolutionary War general in Dutchess County
- Baron Friedrich Wilhelm von Steuben, lived and had a headquarters at Swartwoutville for a time during the Revolutionary War
- John Lorimer Worden, in charge of the ironclad ship Monitor during the American Civil War, lived in Swartwoutville from 1827 to the beginning of the war
- Wallace Worsley, actor and director during the Silent film era.
- Tim Wyskida, drummer, most known for his work with Khanate (band)
