= Hudson Valley Regional Airport =

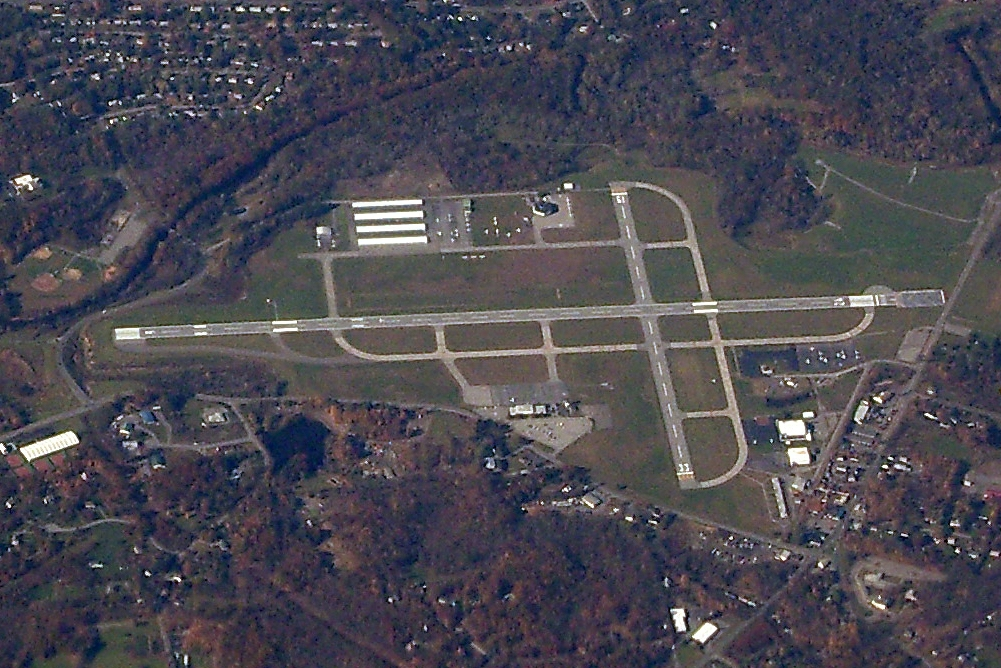
- IATA: POU; ICAO: KPOU; FAA LID: POU

Summary
- Airport type: Public
- Owner: Dutchess County
- Serves: Poughkeepsie, New York
- Location: Town of Wappinger
- Elevation AMSL: 164 ft (50 m)
- Coordinates: 41°37′36″N 073°53′03″W
- Website: POU Website

Maps
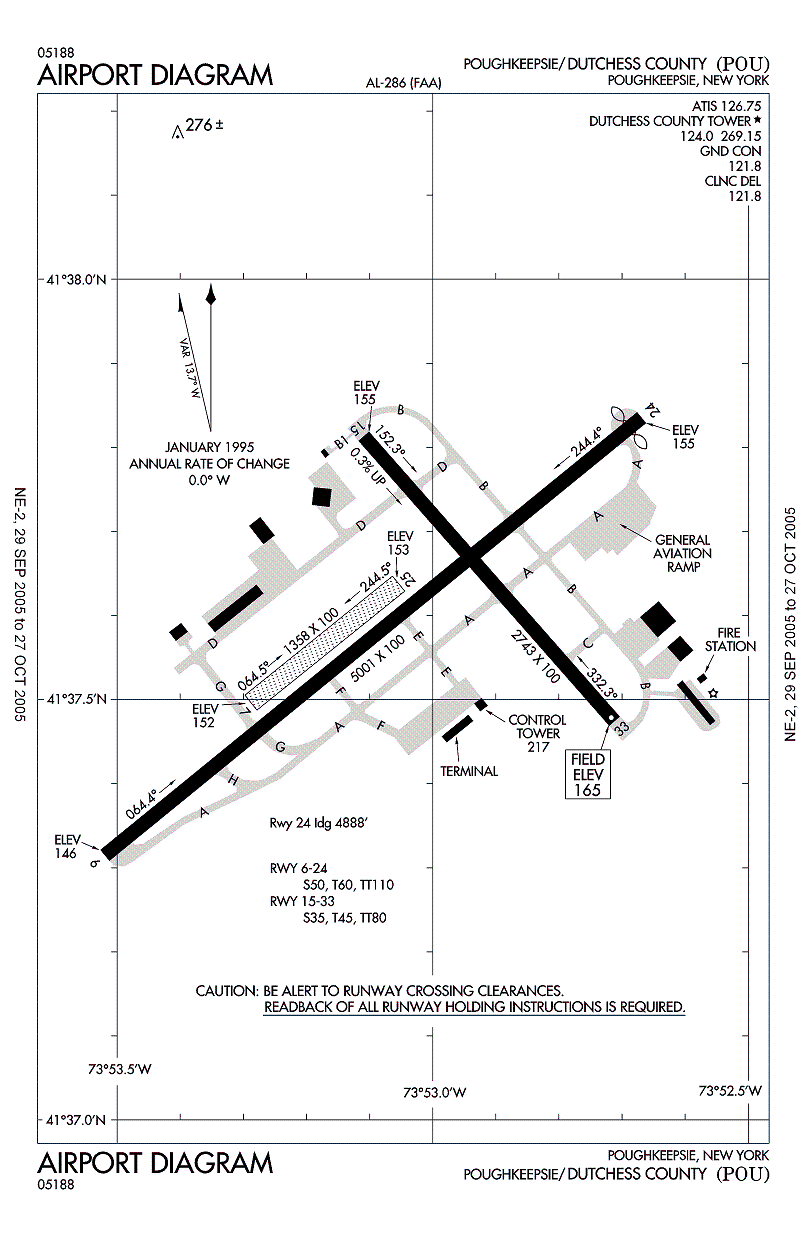
- FAA airport diagram
- Interactive map of Hudson Valley Regional Airport

Runways
Direction	Length		Surface
Direction	ft	m	Surface
6/24	5,001	1,524	Asphalt
15/33	2,744	836	Asphalt/concrete
7/25	1,358	414	Turf/dirt

Statistics (2014)
- Aircraft operations: 75,133
- Based aircraft: 133
- Source: Federal Aviation Administration

Hudson Valley Regional Airport (IATA: POU, ICAO: KPOU, FAA LID: POU), formerly known as Dutchess County Airport, is a county-owned public-use airport located on State Route 376 in the Town of Wappinger, Dutchess County, New York, United States, 4 miles (6.4 km) south of the central business district of Poughkeepsie. It is sometimes called Poughkeepsie Airport, which gives it the code POU. The airport provides corporate and general aviation transportation services.

== History ==
Hudson Valley Regional Airport was built by the United States Department of Commerce in the 1930s and was used for pilot training during World War II by the US Army Air Forces. Known as New Hackensack Field at the time for the adjacent hamlet in Wappingers, it was used by students at nearby West Point and as an extension of military training conducted at Stewart Field. On June 17, 1942, British Prime Minister Winston Churchill flew from Naval Air Station Anacostia to New Hackensack Field, where he was met by President Franklin D. Roosevelt, who had driven from his Hyde Park home.

After the Second World War, the airport was turned over to the county for the sum of $1 and guarantees that it would remain open as part of the Surplus Property Act of 1944 by the War Assets Administration. It was then used for general aviation. IBM built a hangar and based its corporate aircraft and helicopters at the airport, including Gulfstream II jets in the 1970s–1980s. In the 1970s, Cessna built and ran a Cessna Citation maintenance facility on the airport grounds.

=== Scheduled air service ===
Beginning in 1947, scheduled air carrier service was provided at Dutchess County Airport by Colonial Airlines. Its service to POU in 1956 was a DC-3 aircraft from New York City's LaGuardia Airport, making an 11:50 am Monday-Friday flag stop en route to Montreal, Quebec and Ottawa, Ontario in Canada, with intermediate stops at Albany, New York, and Burlington, Vermont. Mohawk Airlines began service in 1956 with flights to Binghamton, New York. Mohawk merged into Allegheny Airlines in 1972 and service was discontinued.

In the 1960s–1980s, the airport had commuter airline service by Command Airways, Colgan Airways, Air North, Henson, Brockway Air, and Metro Northeast. Command Airways, later known as American Eagle Airlines, maintained its hub, executive offices, and maintenance facilities at the airport. Command qualified the ATR 72 with the Federal Aviation Administration (FAA) for U.S. flight operations at the airport. From the mid-1980's thru 1990, Henson and Brockway operated as Piedmont Commuter and Metro Northeast operated as Trans World Express.

In September 1980, the airport opened its current 16,700 sq ft (1,551 m^{2}) terminal building for airline passengers.

When Stewart International Airport, (located just across the Hudson River) started commercial operations in 1990, all airline service ended at Dutchess County Airport. However, in April 1991, CommutAir, operating as US Airways Express, began service on a Buffalo-White Plains-Poughkeepsie-Burlington-Plattsburgh route. CommutAir switched to operate as Continental Connection in late 2000 but left POU on August 12, 2001.

In his County Budget submittal in October 2016 for the following fiscal year, County Executive Marc Molinaro proposed changing the name of the airport to the Hudson Valley Regional Airport. This was approved by the Dutchess County Legislature.

In October 2022, Tradewind Aviation took over two hangars at Hudson Valley Regional Airport, one of which is intended for in-house and open-market hangar space, and the other of which has been donated for use by two historic aviation nonprofits, the Tunison Foundation and the Hudson Valley Wing of the Commemorative Air Force.

== Facilities and aircraft ==
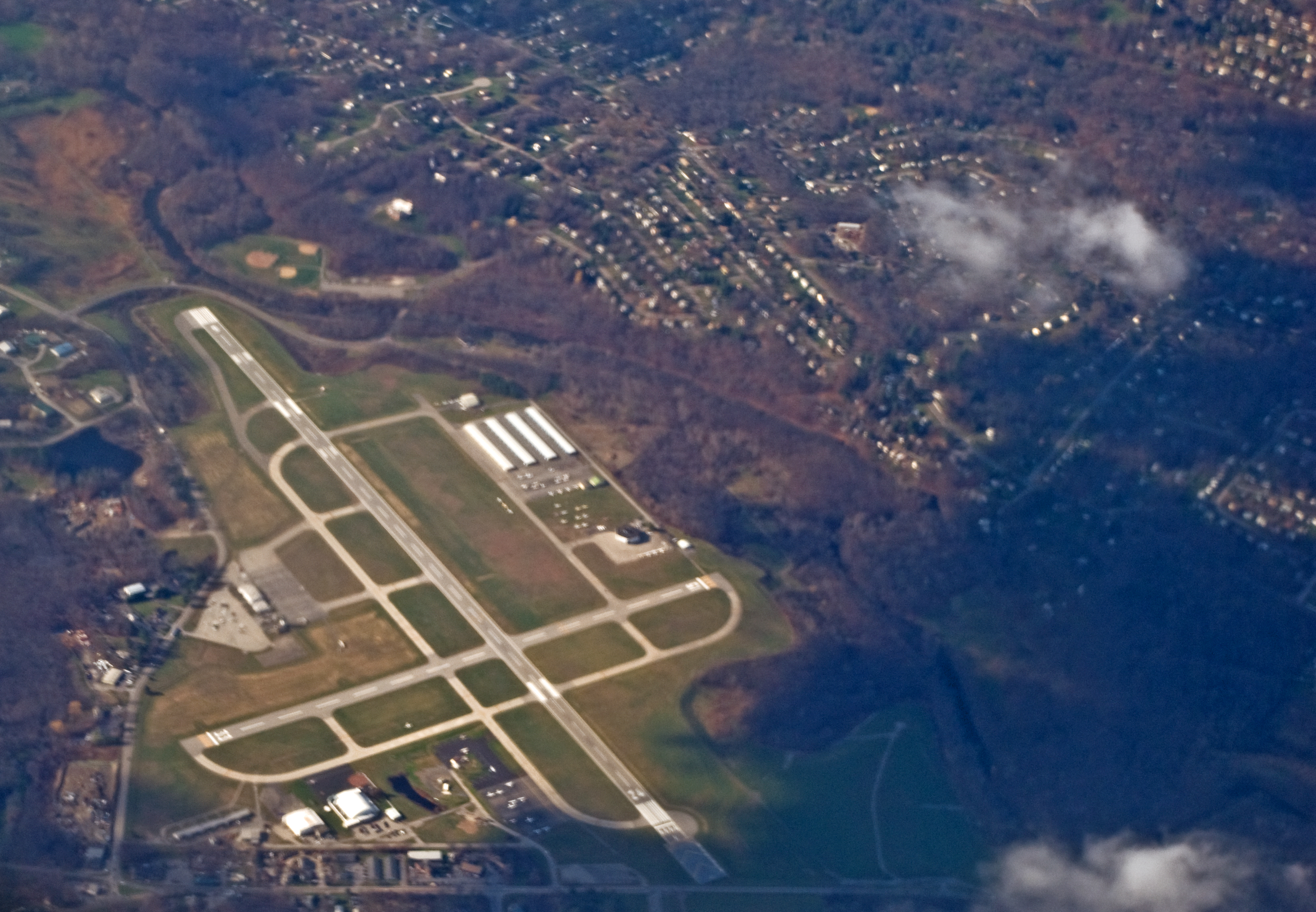
Aerial view of the airport in November 2008

Hudson Valley Regional Airport covers an area of 640 acres (260 ha) which contains three runways, two of which are paved. The main runway (6–24) is 5,001 by 100 feet (1,524 by 30 m) and is equipped with an ILS system to the northeast-facing runway along with a medium intensity approach light system with runway alignment lights. The crosswind runway (15–33) was originally 3,003 feet (915 m) long but is now shortened to 2,744 by 100 feet (836 by 30 m) due to displaced thresholds at both ends. A turf/dirt runway (7–25) measures 1,358 by 100 feet (414 by 30 m).

A flight service station was opened at the airport, but closed during the 1990s. In the 1970s, a control tower was constructed by the FAA, which currently operates it 14 hours per day.

For the 12-month period ending April 30, 2014, the airport had 75,133 aircraft operations, an average of 206 per day: 99% general aviation, 1% air taxi, <1% military. At that time there were 133 aircraft based at this airport: 84% single-engine, 7% multi-engine, 8% helicopter, and 2% military.

There is currently one flight school that operates at the airport, US Aviation Academy, located in the main terminal. Richmor Aviation, previously located on the north side of the airport, left in 2013. Fixed-base operator services have been provided by FlightLevel Dutchess, part of Flight Level Aviation, since August, 2015.

In 2018, the FAA provided a $7.4 million grant to the airport for construction of a new building complex to house Aircraft Rescue Firefighting (ARFF) and snow removal equipment, along with administrative offices. The project will replace the existing 40-year-old structures built in the late 1970s.

The year before, the New York State Department of Transportation awarded Dutchess County $988,500 to fund 90% of the cost for renovations to the airport's terminal building. The improvements include second-floor accessibility, alterations for greater energy efficiency, and upgrades to the structure's exterior and signage.

== Accidents and incidents ==
- On January 26, 1972, a Mohawk Airlines Fairchild FH-227B with 42 passengers aboard a flight from Albany to LaGuardia Airport in New York City was hijacked and diverted to Westchester County Airport. The hijacker permitted all of the passengers to disembark there while he negotiated his demand for $200,000 cash. After several hours on the ground with the hijacker holding a flight attendant at gunpoint, the airline met his demands and the crew then flew the airplane and hijacker to Dutchess County Airport, landing after 3 a.m. As the 45-year-old hijacker attempted to flee the airport in a getaway car, he was killed instantly by a shotgun blast from an FBI agent.
- On March 16, 1976, an overweight Command Airways BE-99 commuter flight to New York City's JFK International Airport with 7 passengers and a crew of two failed to establish a positive rate of climb on takeoff in a snowstorm, crashing just beyond the runway east of Rt. 376. The pilot was injured and the airplane was destroyed in the post-impact fire.
- On the evening of September 24, 1982, an Aero Airways DC-8, bound for Stewart International Airport's 11,817 ft. (3,602m) Runway 27, mistakenly landed instead on the similarly aligned Runway 24 at Hudson Valley Regional Airport. The heavy 4-engine jet airliner landed successfully on the much shorter 5,000 ft. runway, much to the astonishment of airport neighbors accustomed to seeing only small business jets and private aircraft there.

== Cargo ==
There are no cargo operators operating at POU currently.

== See also ==
- List of airports in New York (state)
