= Chelsea, Dutchess County, New York =

Hamlet in New York, United States

Coordinates: 41°33′14″N 73°58′07″W

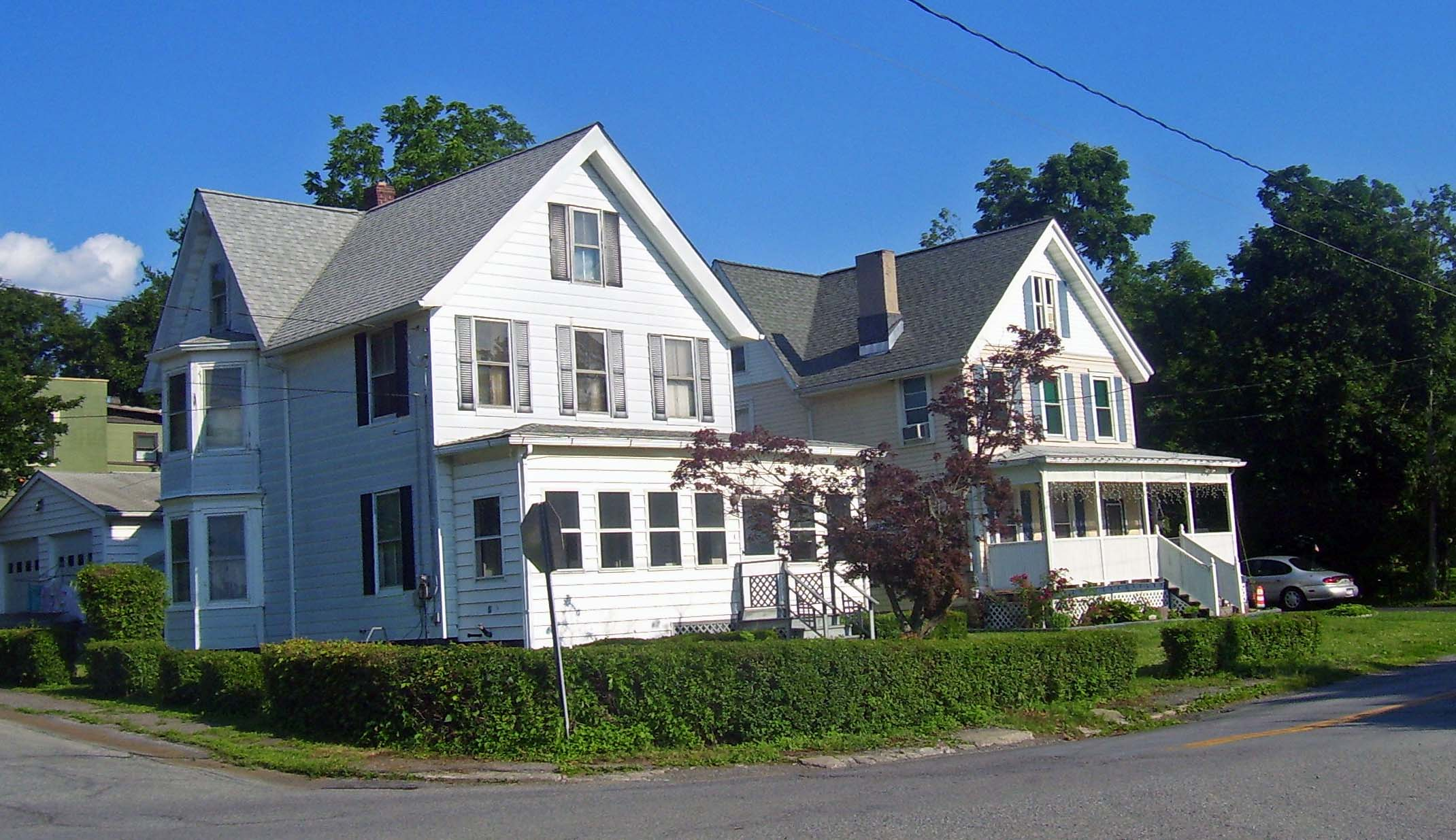
Downtown Chelsea

Chelsea is a hamlet of the Town of Wappinger in Dutchess County, New York, United States. It is located on the Hudson River in the southwestern corner of the town. It takes the ZIP Code 12512 and is in the 845 telephone area code, and has its own fire district.

Chelsea is a small community, primarily residential. A marina is located on the river. Just north of the hamlet is a large pumping station used by the New York City water supply system during droughts to take water directly from the river, since the hamlet is located around the point where the river water becomes fresh enough to drink even in the dryest of times.

== History ==
The hamlet of Chelsea was originally known as Low Point and derived its name from a low point of land extending into the river. It also served to distinguish it from the next hamlet north on the east bank of the river, once known as High Point, now New Hamburg. Circa 1800, Abram Gerow, of Westchester, moved to Low Point and set up a cooperage business. The area was surveyed and laid out into streets in 1812.

The hamlet was called Low Point until the completion of the Hudson River Railroad. At that time it was named Carthage. However, as mail was being misdirected to another Carthage in Jefferson County, it was renamed Carthage Landing. In 1901, when the railroad built a new station, the name became Chelsea.

In approximately 1820, Cornelius Carman established a shipyard at Carthage Landing, where sloops and steamboats were launched, but it could not withstand the competition with Fishkill Landing after John Peter DeWint completed the Long Dock about 1815, with facilities for the shipment of produce from the back country. Carman introduced the first centerboard, on the sloop Freedom. In 1828 he built the Plow Boy, a steam ferry-boat, for Carpenter and De Windt of Fishkill Landing. It was the first steam ferry to ply between Fishkill Landing and Newburgh. In 1830, Richard Carpenter of Newburgh had the steamboat William Young built at Low Point; it ran between Newburgh and Albany. The site of the shipyard is now occupied by the Chelsea Yacht Club.

From 1868 to 1888, Low Point could boast of eight sloops and schooners, including the Fancy, the Henrietta Collyer, the Lydia White, and the Matteawan. Capt. John Pinckney was captain of the schooner Iron Age running from the Manhattan Iron Works. Captain Charles P. Adriance, (son-in-law of Abram Gerow), Solomon P. Hopkins, and Gilbert S. Hopkins conducted a freighting business from Low Point until 1856. In those days, the street leading to the dock was often lined for over a mile with farmers' wagons from as far as Connecticut, waiting to load produce and return with supplies.

A post office at Low Point was established about 1840.

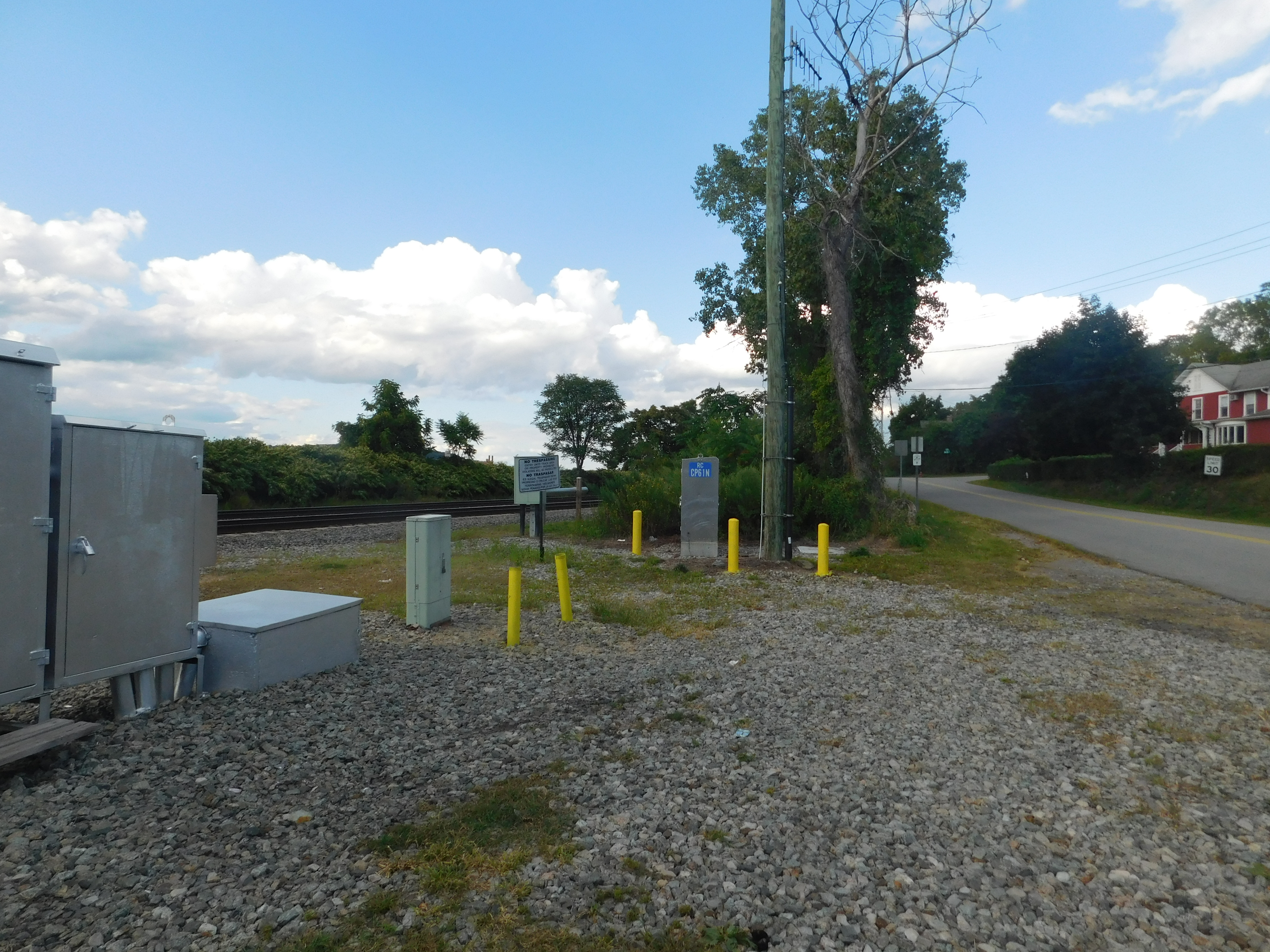
The former New York Central Railroad station site at Chelsea

When the Hudson River Railroad was built, the shipment of goods by water from Low Point declined. In 1856, Starr B. Knox acquired the shipyard property and converted the storehouse into a flour mill. With the opening of the Union Pacific Railroad, the mill was unable to compete with steam mills in the west and closed. In 1878, the property was leased to the Wallkill Cement Company, which produced the Portland cement used in the piers of the Poughkeepsie Bridge. The company later relocated to Port Ewen and the mill was demolished in 1895.

By 1866, the Landing had a post office, school, several stores, a hotel and two churches, serving about 300 residents. The Methodist Church was organized in 1823 and a church building constructed ten years later. St. Mark's Episcopal Church was founded in 1865 by John A. Taplin and thirteen other residents of Carthage Landing, now known as Chelsea, in the Town of Wappinger. In June 1869, Horatio Potter, Bishop of New York, dedicated the new church building. It is in the style of "Carpenter Gothic". The board and batten construction, according to Dutchess County historians, exemplifies "Upjohn inspired parish churches built from Gothic Revival pattern books."

A yacht club was organized in late 1881 for the purpose of ice yachting.

The Chelsea Fire Company, located in the Town of Wappinger, was formed on April 1, 1946. The area was considered “no man's land” as far as fire protection went, since no other community company covered the area. A group of concerned citizens decided to do something about the situation. A vote was taken to form a “fire company”. Rather than wait to secure a bond to fund an equipment purchase, a group of nineteen men decided to put up $1,800 out of their own pockets for a war surplus fire truck. Thus, the company acquired their first piece of equipment, a 1943 Ford Pumper with a 200-gallon tank. Today, the Chelsea Fire District covers properties in the Town of Wappinger and the Town of Fishkill of approximately eight square miles, including a portion of the Hudson River. The fire district includes Stony Kill Farm, an 800-acre state farm and education center, and Dutchess Stadium a minor league baseball stadium home to the Hudson Valley Renegades. Chelsea is currently the home to the Chelsea Yacht Club, two historic churches, a post office, and several national historic register named homes.

== Historic buildings ==
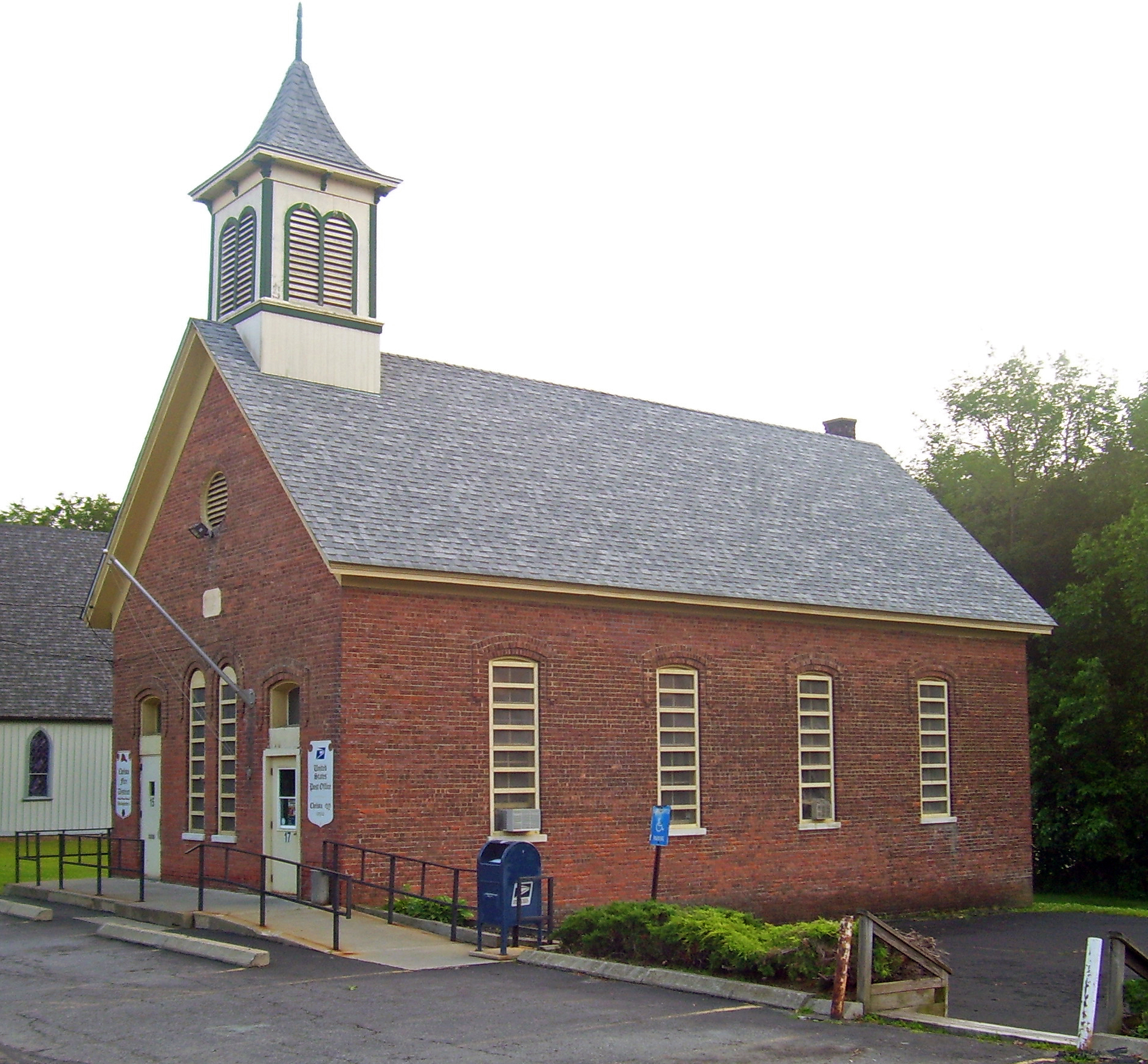
Chelsea Grammar School, Chelsea, NY

The former Chelsea Grammar School is located on Liberty Street. The first public schoolhouse in the Town of Wappinger, it taught children up until high school. It is an intact one-room schoolhouse from the late 19th century, when the hamlet was a thriving Hudson River port. In 1987 it was added to the National Register of Historic Places. Its use as a school ended in the mid-20th century when the smaller local school districts of the area were consolidated into the Wappinger Central School District. Since then, the local fire department has used half of it as a community center, and the United States Postal Service has leased the other half for use as the local post office, serving the 12512 ZIP Code.

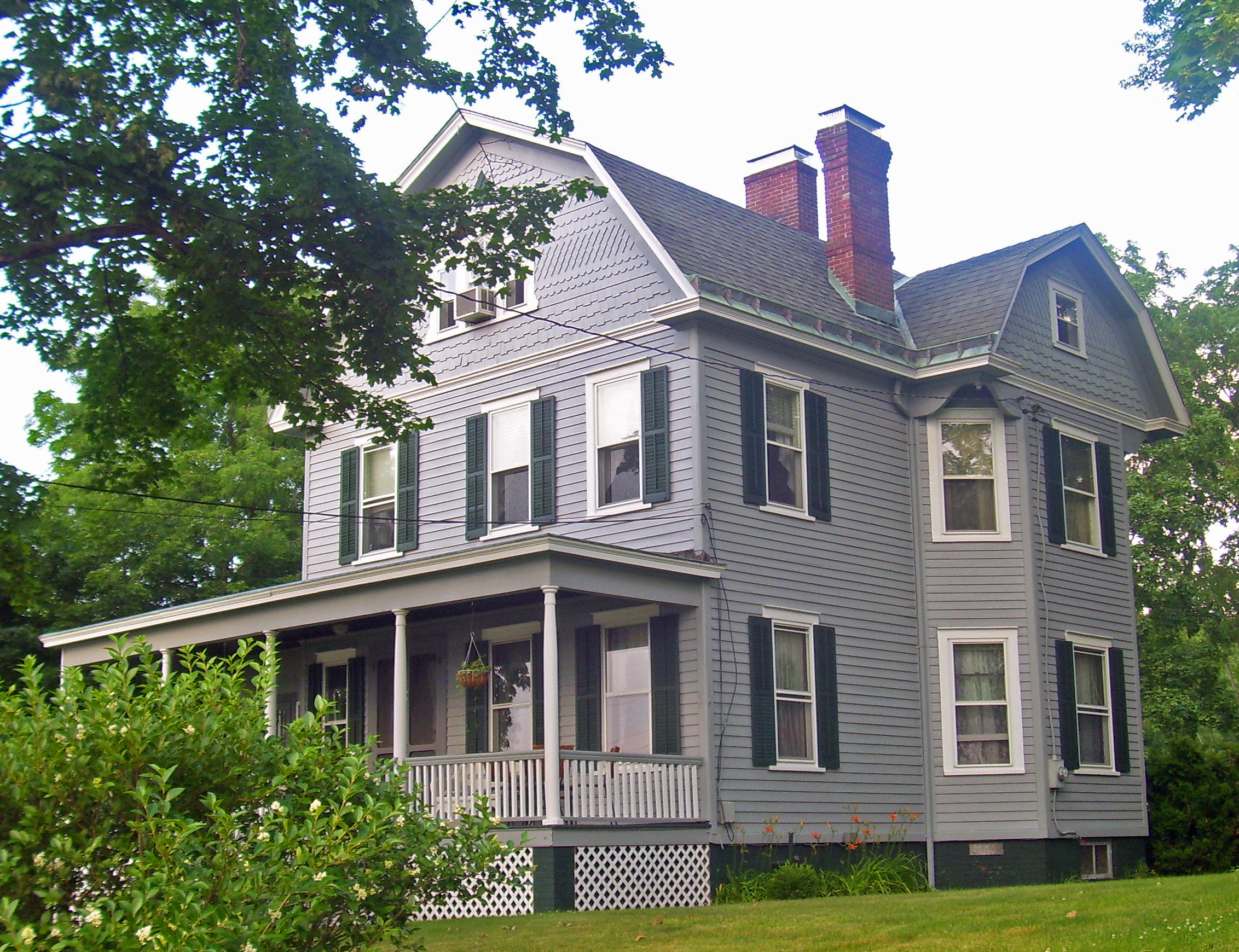
Captain Moses Collyer House

The Captain Moses W. Collyer House, aka "Driftwood", is located on River Road South in Chelsea, New York, United States. It was listed on the National Register of Historic Places in 1987. Moses Collyer was a riverboat captain on the nearby Hudson, from 1899 until his death on September 22, 1942. He co-wrote "The Sloops of the Hudson", a memoir and history of the years when sailboats were the primary means of getting up and down the river. An exhaustive and complete work that drew on Collyer's background in a riverfaring family, it is today considered the definitive history of that era and its boats.
