= Brinckerhoff, New York =

- Census-designated place
- Location of Brinckerhoff, New York
- Coordinates: 41°33′1″N 73°52′10″W
- Country: United States
- State: New York
- County: Dutchess
- Towns: Fishkill, Wappinger

Area
  - Total: 1.76 sq mi (4.57 km^{2})
  - Land: 1.76 sq mi (4.56 km^{2})
  - Water: 0.0039 sq mi (0.01 km^{2})
- Elevation: 220 ft (67 m)

Population (2020)
  - Total: 3,377
  - Density: 1,918.5/sq mi (740.73/km^{2})
- Time zone: UTC-5 (Eastern (EST))
  - Summer (DST): UTC-4 (EDT)
- ZIP Codes: 12524 (Fishkill); 12533 (Hopewell Junction)
- FIPS code: 36-08334
- GNIS feature ID: 0972261

Brinckerhoff is a hamlet and census-designated place (CDP) in Dutchess County, New York, United States. As of the 2020 census, Brinckerhoff had a population of 3,377. It is part of the Kiryas Joel–Poughkeepsie–Newburgh, NY Metropolitan Statistical Area as well as the larger New York–Newark–Bridgeport, NY-NJ-CT-PA Combined Statistical Area.

Brinckerhoff is in the northeastern corner of the town of Fishkill, northeast of the village of Fishkill.

== Geography ==
Brinckerhoff is located in southwestern Dutchess County at 41°33′1″N 73°52′10″W (41.550393, -73.869501). Most of the community is in the northeastern section of the town of Fishkill, but a small part extends north into the southeastern corner of the town of Wappinger.

According to the United States Census Bureau, the CDP has a total area of 1.1 square miles (2.9 km^{2}), of which 0.004 square miles (0.01 km^{2}), or 0.47%, is water.

== Demographics ==
Historical population
Census	Pop.	Note	%±
2020	3,377		—
U.S. Decennial Census

=== 2020 census ===
As of the 2020 census, Brinckerhoff had a population of 3,377. The median age was 48.2 years. 18.7% of residents were under the age of 18 and 22.5% of residents were 65 years of age or older. For every 100 females there were 89.7 males, and for every 100 females age 18 and over there were 88.5 males age 18 and over.

100.0% of residents lived in urban areas, while 0.0% lived in rural areas.

There were 1,283 households in Brinckerhoff, of which 28.9% had children under the age of 18 living in them. Of all households, 56.9% were married-couple households, 14.6% were households with a male householder and no spouse or partner present, and 23.7% were households with a female householder and no spouse or partner present. About 24.5% of all households were made up of individuals and 12.4% had someone living alone who was 65 years of age or older.

There were 1,336 housing units, of which 4.0% were vacant. The homeowner vacancy rate was 0.9% and the rental vacancy rate was 4.9%.

Racial composition as of the 2020 census
Race	Number	Percent
White	2,590	76.7%
Black or African American	183	5.4%
American Indian and Alaska Native	7	0.2%
Asian	119	3.5%
Native Hawaiian and Other Pacific Islander	0	0.0%
Some other race	199	5.9%
Two or more races	279	8.3%
Hispanic or Latino (of any race)	487	14.4%

=== 2000 census ===
As of the census of 2000, there were 2,734 people, 999 households, and 767 families residing in the CDP. The population density was 2,518.5 inhabitants per square mile (972.4/km^{2}). There were 1,006 housing units at an average density of 926.7 per square mile (357.8/km^{2}). The racial makeup of the CDP was 89.72% White, 4.50% African American, 0.04% Native American, 4.61% Asian, 0.48% from other races, and 0.66% from two or more races. Hispanic or Latino of any race were 5.49% of the population.

There were 999 households, out of which 34.0% had children under the age of 18 living with them, 66.4% were married couples living together, 7.1% had a female householder with no husband present, and 23.2% were non-families. 20.1% of all households were made up of individuals, and 7.9% had someone living alone who was 65 years of age or older. The average household size was 2.74 and the average family size was 3.17.

In the CDP, the population was spread out, with 24.3% under the age of 18, 6.1% from 18 to 24, 29.0% from 25 to 44, 27.7% from 45 to 64, and 12.9% who were 65 years of age or older. The median age was 39 years. For every 100 females, there were 96.4 males. For every 100 females age 18 and over, there were 90.5 males.

The median income for a household in the CDP was $65,994, and the median income for a family was $68,030. Males had a median income of $55,678 versus $26,737 for females. The per capita income for the CDP was $26,706. About 1.3% of families and 3.0% of the population were below the poverty line, including 5.9% of those under age 18 and none of those age 65 or over.
