= Myers Corner, New York =

- Census-designated place
- Location of Myers Corner, New York
- Coordinates: 41°35′34″N 73°52′21″W
- Country: United States
- State: New York
- County: Dutchess
- Town: Wappinger

Area
  - Total: 8.59 sq mi (22.24 km^{2})
  - Land: 8.54 sq mi (22.12 km^{2})
  - Water: 0.046 sq mi (0.12 km^{2})
- Elevation: 217 ft (66 m)

Population (2020)
  - Total: 10,598
  - Density: 1,240.9/sq mi (479.12/km^{2})
- Time zone: UTC-5 (Eastern (EST))
  - Summer (DST): UTC-4 (EDT)
- ZIP Codes: 12590 (Wappingers Falls); 12524 (Fishkill)
- FIPS code: 36-49363
- GNIS feature ID: 0958227

Myers Corner is a hamlet and census-designated place (CDP) in the town of Wappinger, Dutchess County, New York, United States. As of the 2020 census, Myers Corner had a population of 10,598. It is part of the Kiryas Joel–Poughkeepsie–Newburgh, NY Metropolitan Statistical Area as well as the larger New York–Newark–Bridgeport, NY-NJ-CT-PA Combined Statistical Area.

Myers Corner is in the town of Wappinger on County Route 93 and County Route 94. Myers Corners School is also located here.

== Geography ==
Myers Corner is located in the eastern part of the town of Wappinger at 41°35′34″N 73°52′21″W (41.592776, -73.872365). It is bordered on its farthest western extent by the village of Wappingers Falls and to the east by Sprout Creek, which forms the border with the town of East Fishkill. Myers Corner is 8 miles (13 km) south of the city of Poughkeepsie and 10 miles (16 km) northeast of the city of Beacon.

According to the United States Census Bureau, the Myers Corner CDP has a total area of 5.1 square miles (13.1 km^{2}), of which 5.0 square miles (13.0 km^{2}) is land and 0.04 square miles (0.1 km^{2}), or 0.76%, is water.

== Demographics ==
Historical population
Census	Pop.	Note	%±
2020	10,598		—
U.S. Decennial Census

=== 2020 census ===
As of the 2020 census, Myers Corner had a population of 10,598. The median age was 46.0 years. 18.8% of residents were under the age of 18 and 21.4% of residents were 65 years of age or older. For every 100 females there were 96.3 males, and for every 100 females age 18 and over there were 94.2 males age 18 and over.

100.0% of residents lived in urban areas, while 0.0% lived in rural areas.

There were 3,965 households in Myers Corner, of which 29.0% had children under the age of 18 living in them. Of all households, 59.5% were married-couple households, 14.6% were households with a male householder and no spouse or partner present, and 21.0% were households with a female householder and no spouse or partner present. About 20.4% of all households were made up of individuals and 9.3% had someone living alone who was 65 years of age or older.

There were 4,130 housing units, of which 4.0% were vacant. The homeowner vacancy rate was 0.9% and the rental vacancy rate was 5.9%.

Racial composition as of the 2020 census
Race	Number	Percent
White	7,666	72.3%
Black or African American	701	6.6%
American Indian and Alaska Native	66	0.6%
Asian	599	5.7%
Native Hawaiian and Other Pacific Islander	1	0.0%
Some other race	591	5.6%
Two or more races	974	9.2%
Hispanic or Latino (of any race)	1,677	15.8%

=== 2000 census ===
As of the 2000 census, there were 5,546 people, 1,808 households, and 1,583 families residing in the CDP. The population density was 1,301.3 inhabitants per square mile (502.4/km^{2}). There were 1,852 housing units at an average density of 434.5 per square mile (167.8/km^{2}). The racial makeup of the CDP was 86.57% White, 4.31% African American, 0.22% Native American, 5.46% Asian, 0.05% Pacific Islander, 1.48% from other races, and 1.91% from two or more races. Hispanic or Latino of any race were 6.31% of the population.

There were 1,808 households, out of which 40.5% had children under the age of 18 living with them, 77.8% were married couples living together, 7.0% had a female householder with no husband present, and 12.4% were non-families. 9.8% of all households were made up of individuals, and 4.2% had someone living alone who was 65 years of age or older. The average household size was 3.06 and the average family size was 3.27.

In the CDP, the population was spread out, with 27.6% under the age of 18, 6.3% from 18 to 24, 27.4% from 25 to 44, 28.5% from 45 to 64, and 10.2% who were 65 years of age or older. The median age was 38 years. For every 100 females, there were 96.7 males. For every 100 females age 18 and over, there were 94.5 males.

The median income for a household in the CDP was $76,142, and the median income for a family was $81,894. Males had a median income of $61,856 versus $32,169 for females. The per capita income for the CDP was $27,114. About 1.7% of families and 3.3% of the population were below the poverty line, including 3.2% of those under age 18 and 4.4% of those age 65 or over.
