= New Hackensack, New York =

- Census-designated place
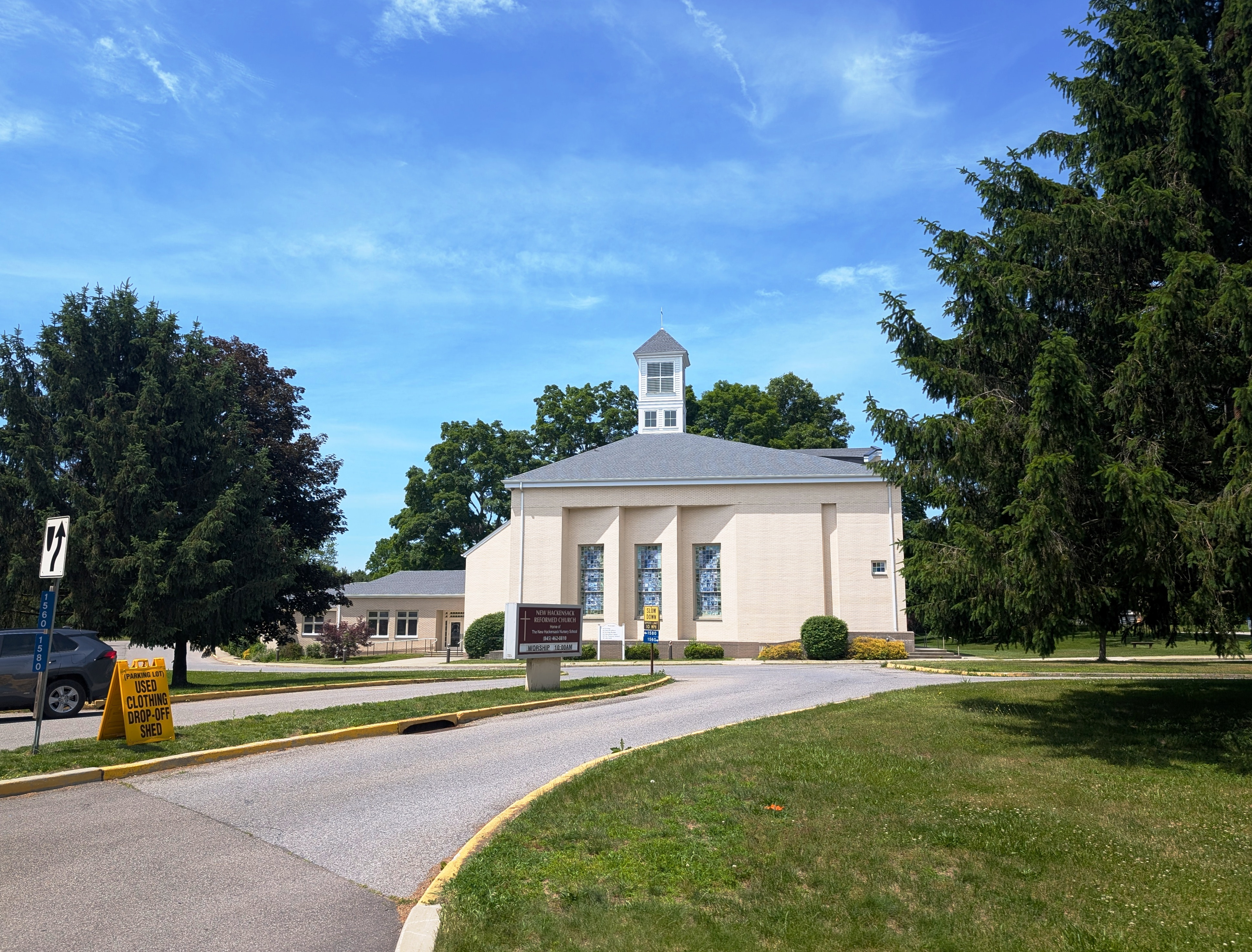
- New Hackensack Reformed Church

- Location within New York Location within the United States
- Coordinates: 41°37′17″N 73°52′8″W
- Country: United States
- State: New York
- County: Dutchess
- Town: Wappinger

Area
  - Total: 2.08 sq mi (5.38 km^{2})
  - Land: 2.07 sq mi (5.37 km^{2})
  - Water: 0.0039 sq mi (0.01 km^{2})
- Elevation: 192 ft (59 m)

Population (2020)
  - Total: 1,497
  - Density: 721.4/sq mi (278.55/km^{2})
- Time zone: UTC-5 (Eastern (EST))
  - Summer (DST): UTC-4 (EDT)
- ZIP Code: 12590 (Wappingers Falls)
- Area code: 845
- FIPS code: 36-50265
- GNIS feature ID: 2812764

New Hackensack is an unincorporated community and census-designated place (CDP) in the town of Wappinger in Dutchess County, New York, United States. As of the 2020 census, New Hackensack had a population of 1,497. It was first listed as a CDP prior to the 2020 census.

New Hackensack is in western Dutchess County, in the northeastern section of Wappinger. It is bordered to the southwest by the Myers Corner CDP and to the west by the Hudson Valley Regional Airport, formerly known as Dutchess County Airport and originally known as "New Hackensack Field" in the 1930s and 1940s. New York State Route 376 passes through the community, leading north 7 miles (11 km) to Poughkeepsie and southeast 5 miles (8 km) to Hopewell Junction. Wappingers Falls is 3 miles (5 km) to the southwest.

== Demographics ==
Historical population
Census	Pop.	Note	%±
2020	1,497		—
U.S. Decennial Census
