= Roy C. Ketcham High School =

Location
- 99 Myers Corners Road; Wappingers Falls, New York 12590; United States; 41.59743°N 73.89214°W

Information
- Type: Public Secondary
- Established: 1962
- School district: Wappingers Central School District
- Principal: Anthony Giovinazzi (interim)
- Faculty: 115.87 (on an FTE basis)
- Grades: 9-12
- Enrollment: 1,557 (2024–2025)
- Student to teacher ratio: 13.44
- Colors: Red; Navy Blue
- Mascot: Storm
- Website: rkhs.wappingersschools.org

Roy C. Ketcham High School, more informally Ketcham High School, RCK, or Ketcham, is a public secondary school under jurisdiction of the Wappingers Central School District. Located in Wappingers Falls, New York, United States, the school serves approximately 1,600 students in grades nine through twelve residing in the southwest of Dutchess County. Their mascot is the Ketcham Storm.

== History ==
As a result of considerable population growth in Dutchess County during the 1940s and 1950s, a new senior high school was built and opened to students in the fall of 1962. It was named in honor of Roy C. Ketcham, who had been a prominent member of the town's board of education for a quarter of a century.

In 1987 the school became involved in a national controversy when 11th grade African-American student Tawana Brawley skipped class and faked her own abduction and rape, falsely accusing four white men of the crime which included writing racial slurs on her body and smearing her in feces. A grand jury hearing later found all the allegations to have been fabricated and Brawley lost a defamation suit against one of her victims.

Prior to 2023, the school's mascot was the Indians. In 2023, the New York State Education Department ruled that all schools using Native American mascots must change them. After a heated local debate and multiple student votes, it was ruled that the schools mascot would be changed to the Ketcham Storm.

=== Athletics ===
- Cheerleading
- Bowling
- Basketball
- Football
- Golf
- Crew Club
- Hockey Club
- Baseball
- Gymnastics
- Soccer
- Track and Field
- Cross Country
- Tennis
- Lacrosse Club
- Wrestling
- Volleyball
- Softball
- Swimming
- Field Hockey Section 1 (NYSPHSAA)

== Academics ==
The music department occasionally hosts regional events at the school, such as NYSSMA competitions, Area All State Festivals, and All County Jazz Festivals. Roy C. Ketcham's current principal is David Seipp.

== Notable alumni ==
- Tyler Adams (2017), athlete, soccer midfielder
- Beloved Promise (attended from 2006 to 2008), athlete, Olympic high jumper
- Dario Brose, athlete
- Jeh Johnson (1975), lawyer who was United States Secretary of Homeland Security from 2013 to 2017
- Keith Lockhart (1977), music director of the Boston Pops Orchestra from 1995 to present
- Bo Oshoniyi, athlete, soccer goalkeeper
- John Regan, musician, bassist
- Mary Chris Wall, actress
- D. B. Woodside (1987), actor
