= Spackenkill, New York =

- Census-designated place
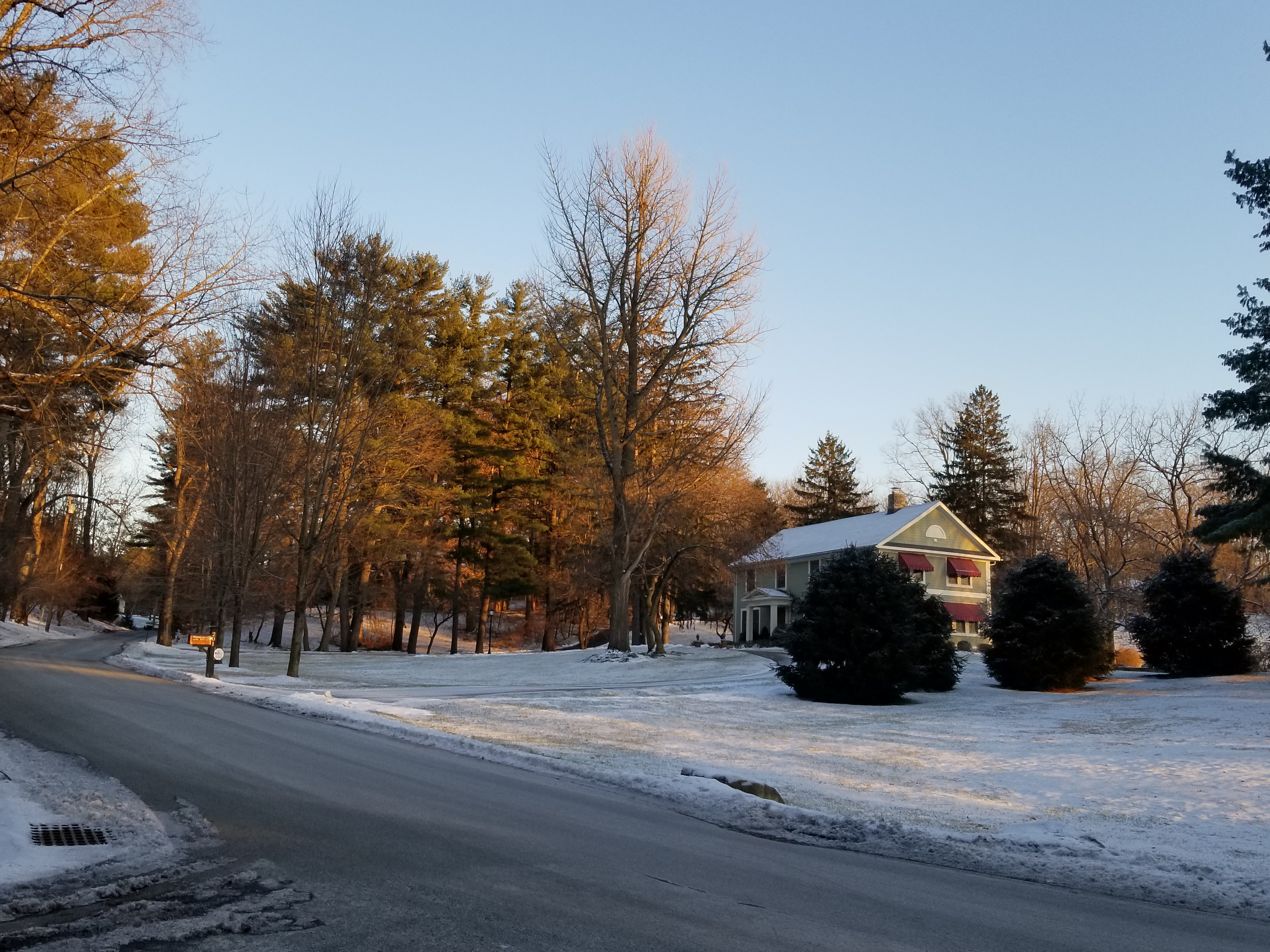
- Residential area in Spackenkill, December 2019

- Location of Spackenkill, New York
- Coordinates: 41°39′33″N 73°54′52″W
- Country: United States
- State: New York
- County: Dutchess
- Town: Poughkeepsie

Area
  - Total: 1.80 sq mi (4.66 km^{2})
  - Land: 1.80 sq mi (4.65 km^{2})
  - Water: 0 sq mi (0.00 km^{2})
- Elevation: 175 ft (53 m)

Population (2020)
  - Total: 4,223
  - Density: 2,349.7/sq mi (907.23/km^{2})
- Time zone: UTC-5 (Eastern (EST))
  - Summer (DST): UTC-4 (EDT)
- ZIP Codes: 12601, 12603 (Poughkeepsie)
- Area code: 845
- FIPS code: 36-70035
- GNIS feature ID: 1867420

Spackenkill (/ˈspækənˌkɪl/) is a hamlet and census-designated place (CDP) in Dutchess County, New York, United States. As of the 2020 census, Spackenkill had a population of 4,223. It is part of the Kiryas Joel–Poughkeepsie–Newburgh, NY Metropolitan Statistical Area as well as the larger New York–Newark–Bridgeport, NY-NJ-CT-PA Combined Statistical Area.

Spackenkill is in the town of Poughkeepsie. Children in the community, if they attend public school, go to the Spackenkill Union Free School District. An IBM plant is also located in this community, and many of its employees live in Spackenkill. Several informal neighborhoods exist within the Spackenkill community such as Hagantown, Nassau, King George, Beechwood, Crown Heights, and Kingwood Park. These neighborhoods contain some of the schools of the Spackenkill School District.

== Geography ==
Spackenkill is located in the south-central part of the town of Poughkeepsie at 41°39.1′N 73°54.5′W (41.6510, -73.9078). Neighboring communities include Crown Heights to the southwest and Red Oaks Mill to the east. The city of Poughkeepsie is 4 miles (6 km) to the north.

According to the United States Census Bureau, the Spackenkill CDP has a total area of 1.8 square miles (4.6 km^{2}), all land.

== Demographics ==
Historical population
| Census | Pop. | Note | %± |
|---|---|---|---|
| 2000 | 4,756 | | — |
| 2010 | 4,123 | | −13.3% |
| 2020 | 4,223 | | 2.4% |
U.S. Decennial Census

=== 2020 census ===
As of the 2020 census, Spackenkill had a population of 4,223. The median age was 44.9 years. 22.9% of residents were under the age of 18 and 20.2% of residents were 65 years of age or older. For every 100 females there were 96.1 males, and for every 100 females age 18 and over there were 95.3 males age 18 and over.

100.0% of residents lived in urban areas, while 0.0% lived in rural areas.

There were 1,422 households in Spackenkill, of which 34.6% had children under the age of 18 living in them. Of all households, 68.1% were married-couple households, 10.9% were households with a male householder and no spouse or partner present, and 15.9% were households with a female householder and no spouse or partner present. About 13.9% of all households were made up of individuals and 8.3% had someone living alone who was 65 years of age or older.

There were 1,469 housing units, of which 3.2% were vacant. The homeowner vacancy rate was 0.3% and the rental vacancy rate was 4.9%.

Racial composition as of the 2020 census
| Race | Number | Percent |
|---|---|---|
| White | 3,027 | 71.7% |
| Black or African American | 289 | 6.8% |
| American Indian and Alaska Native | 2 | 0.0% |
| Asian | 412 | 9.8% |
| Native Hawaiian and Other Pacific Islander | 2 | 0.0% |
| Some other race | 142 | 3.4% |
| Two or more races | 349 | 8.3% |
| Hispanic or Latino (of any race) | 478 | 11.3% |

=== 2000 census ===
As of the census of 2000, there were 4,756 people, 1,687 households, and 1,396 families residing in the CDP. The population density was 1,633.7 inhabitants per square mile (630.8/km^{2}). There were 1,729 housing units at an average density of 593.9 per square mile (229.3/km^{2}). The racial makeup of the CDP was 86.90% White, 3.85% African American, 0.11% Native American, 6.67% Asian, 0.04% Pacific Islander, 1.09% from other races, and 1.35% from two or more races. Hispanic or Latino of any race were 4.98% of the population.

There were 1,687 households, out of which 37.7% had children under the age of 18 living with them, 74.5% were married couples living together, 6.2% had a female householder with no husband present, and 17.2% were non-families. 14.9% of all households were made up of individuals, and 8.5% had someone living alone who was 65 years of age or older. The average household size was 2.80 and the average family size was 3.10.

In the CDP, the population was spread out, with 27.2% under the age of 18, 4.6% from 18 to 24, 23.1% from 25 to 44, 28.8% from 45 to 64, and 16.2% who were 65 years of age or older. The median age was 42 years. For every 100 females, there were 96.9 males. For every 100 females age 18 and over, there were 93.8 males.

The median income for a household in the CDP was $77,689, and the median income for a family was $83,596. Males had a median income of $61,454 versus $41,349 for females. The per capita income for the CDP was $35,774. About 0.4% of families and 1.5% of the population were below the poverty line, including 0.8% of those under age 18 and none of those age 65 or over.

== Education ==
Most of the CDP is in the Spackenkill Union Free School District, while a portion is in the Wappingers Central School District. The sole comprehensive high school of the Spackenkill district is Spackenkill High School.

== Transportation ==
The main arterial road through the area is U.S. Route 9, running north-south. New York State Route 113 runs east to Red Oaks Mill.

The nearest rail transportation is Amtrak and Metro North at Poughkeepsie station to the north and at New Hamburg station, to the south. Until 1952, the New York Central Railroad local trains from New York City to Poughkeepsie made stops at the Camelot station (5.3 miles south of Poughkeepsie Station), which was to the southwest of where the IBM campus is today and west of IBM Road.

== Notable person ==
This area is home to professional poker player Hevad Khan. Khan finished sixth in the Main Event of the 2007 World Series of Poker.
