= Van Keurens, New York =

- Hamlet
- Location in New York state
- Coordinates: 41°38′42.81″N 73°56′36.73″W
- Country: United States
- State: New York
- County: Dutchess
- Town: Poughkeepsie

Van Keurens is a hamlet in the town of Poughkeepsie, Dutchess County, New York, United States. It was established by Matheus Van Keuren in the eighteenth century.

The Van Keurens lived in Kingston, New York, but Matheus owned a foundry on a parcel of land on the Hudson River, close to what is now IBM, in the community of Spackenkill. Matheus forged at his foundry at Spackenkill many of the links of the chain used during the Revolutionary War as part of the Hudson River Chain around Fort Montgomery.

The hamlet is now partly a wooded, unpopulated area between IBM and the Clinton Point Quarry owned by Tilcon, Inc., and part of land that rests on a Spackenkill residential community known informally as Crown Heights.
