= Poughkeepsie (town), New York =

Poughkeepsie
- Town
- Town of Poughkeepsie
- Clockwise from top left: Locust Grove, Stone Street Historic District, Vassar College, Red Oaks Mill

- Seal

- Location of the town of Poughkeepsie, New York
- Coordinates: 41°40′16″N 73°54′25″W
- Country: United States
- State: New York
- County: Dutchess

Government
  - Type: Town Council
  - Town Supervisor: Rebecca Edwards (D)
  - Town Council: Members' List: • W1: Jeff Renihan (R); • W2: William Carlos Jr. (R); • W3: Jessica Lopez (D); • W4: Michael Cifone (R); • W5: Matthew Woolever (D); • W6: Ann Shershin (D)

Area
  - Total: 31.2 sq mi (80.7 km^{2})
  - Land: 28.5 sq mi (73.9 km^{2})
  - Water: 2.6 sq mi (6.8 km^{2})
- Elevation: 230 ft (70 m)

Population (2020)
  - Total: 45,471
  - Density: 1,520/sq mi (586.9/km^{2})
- Time zone: UTC-5 (Eastern (EST))
  - Summer (DST): UTC-4 (EDT)
- ZIP codes: 12601-12604 (Poughkeepsie); 12590 (Wappingers Falls)
- Area code: 845
- FIPS code: 36-59652
- GNIS feature ID: 0979393
- Website: www.townofpoughkeepsie-ny.gov

Poughkeepsie (/pəˈkɪpsi/ pə-KIP-see), officially the Town of Poughkeepsie, is a town in Dutchess County, New York, United States. As of the 2020 United States Census, the population was 45,471. The name is derived from the native compound Uppuqui-ipis-ing, from Uppuqui (/uːˈpuːki/ oo-POO-kee) meaning "lodge-covered", plus ipis meaning "little water", plus ing meaning "place", all of which translates to "the reed-covered lodge by the little water place". This later evolved into Apokeepsing, then into Poughkeepsing, and finally Poughkeepsie.

The area includes a large IBM campus noted for its ongoing development and manufacturing of IBM mainframes.

== History ==
The town of Poughkeepsie, encompassed within the Schuyler Patent of 1688, was first settled circa 1697. Analysis of a 1714 Census of Dutchess County by historian and writer Helen Wilkinson Reynolds suggests that twenty-four families resided in the modern borders of the township, totaling to 170 residents. The town of Poughkeepsie was established in 1788 as part of a general organization of towns in the county. In 1854, part of the western section of the town, already an independent village, became the city of Poughkeepsie. At least two National Historic Landmarks are located in the town: the Vassar College Observatory and the Main Building of Vassar College.

== Education ==
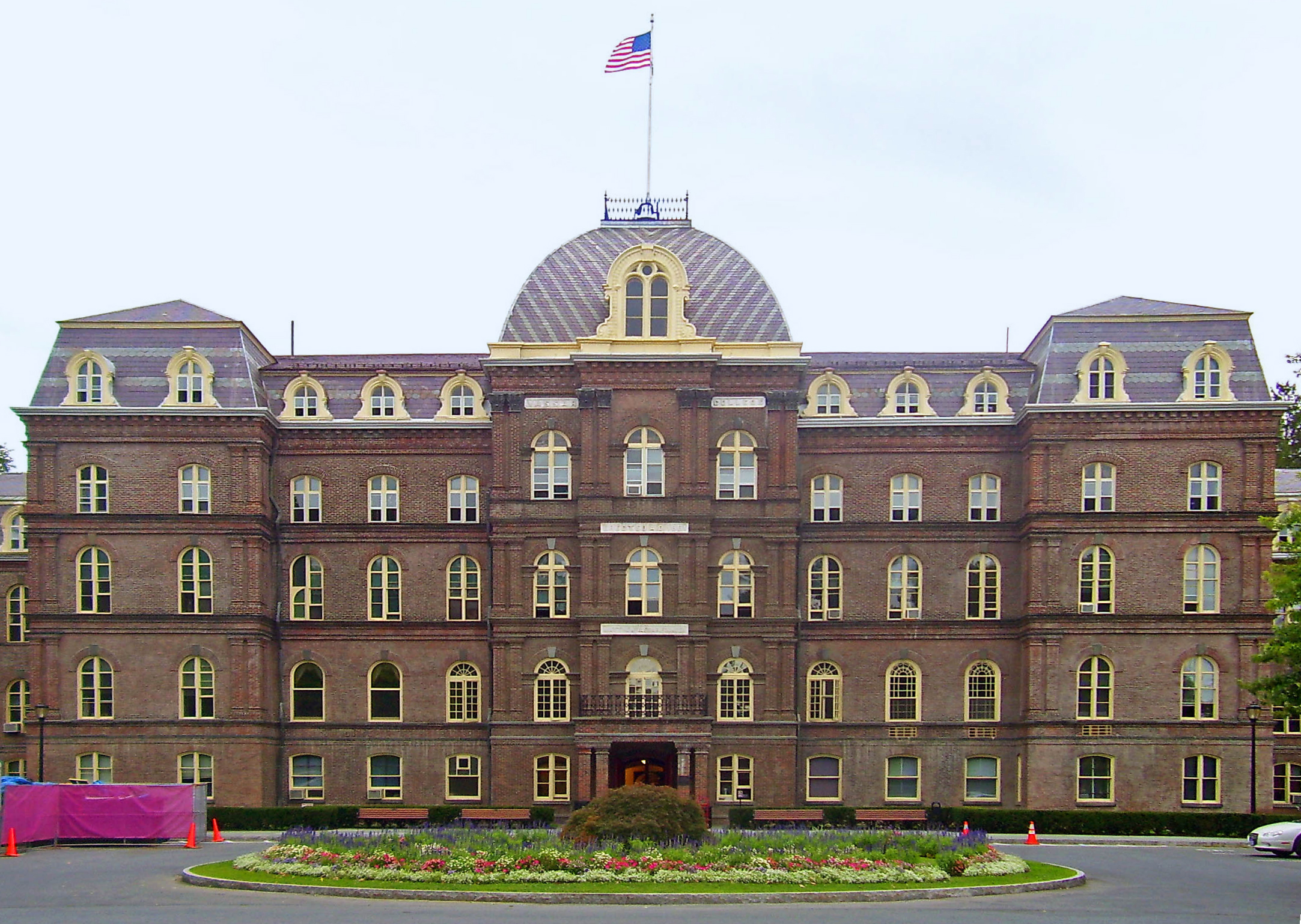
The Main Building at Vassar College

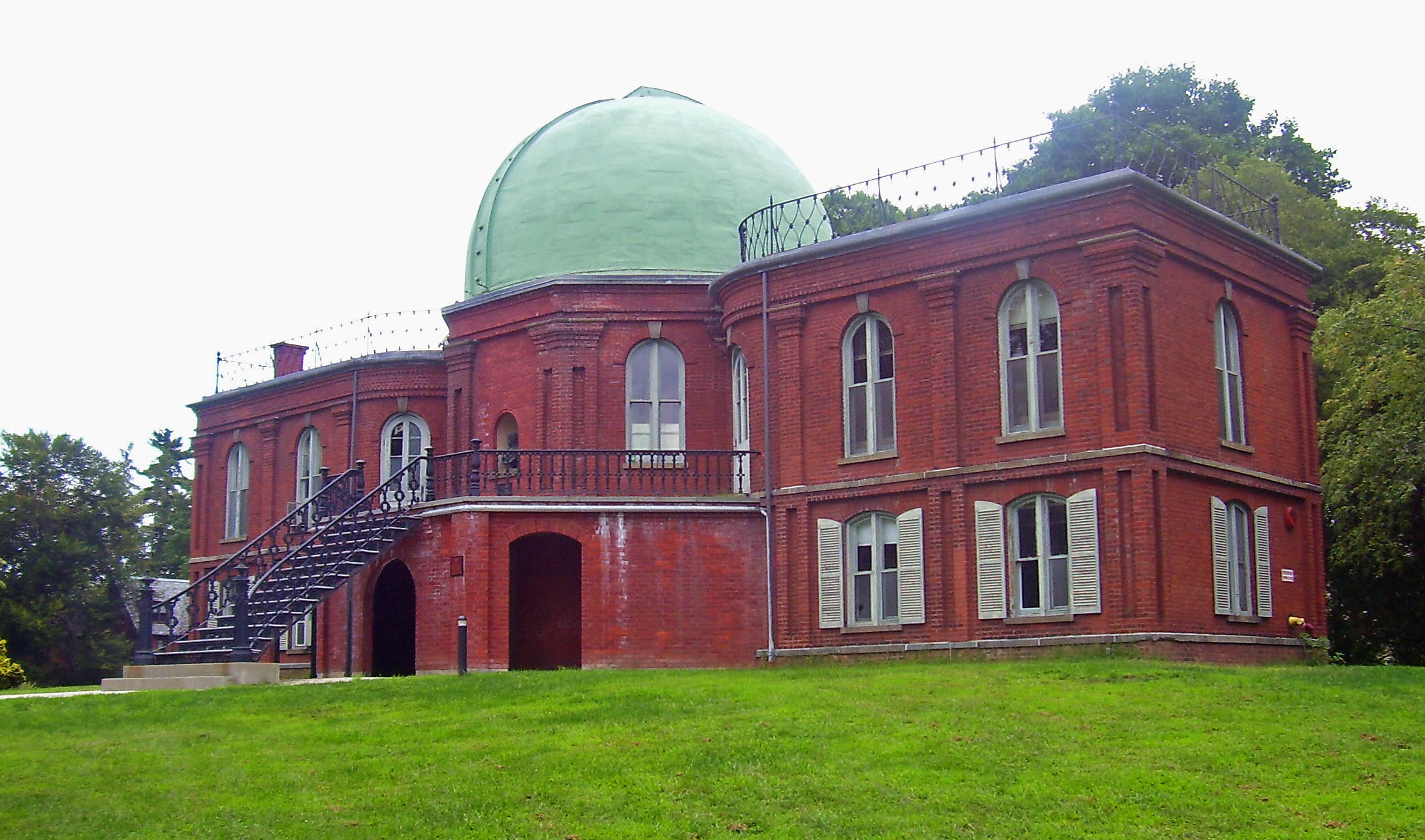
Vassar College Observatory

James A. Cannavino Library at Marist University

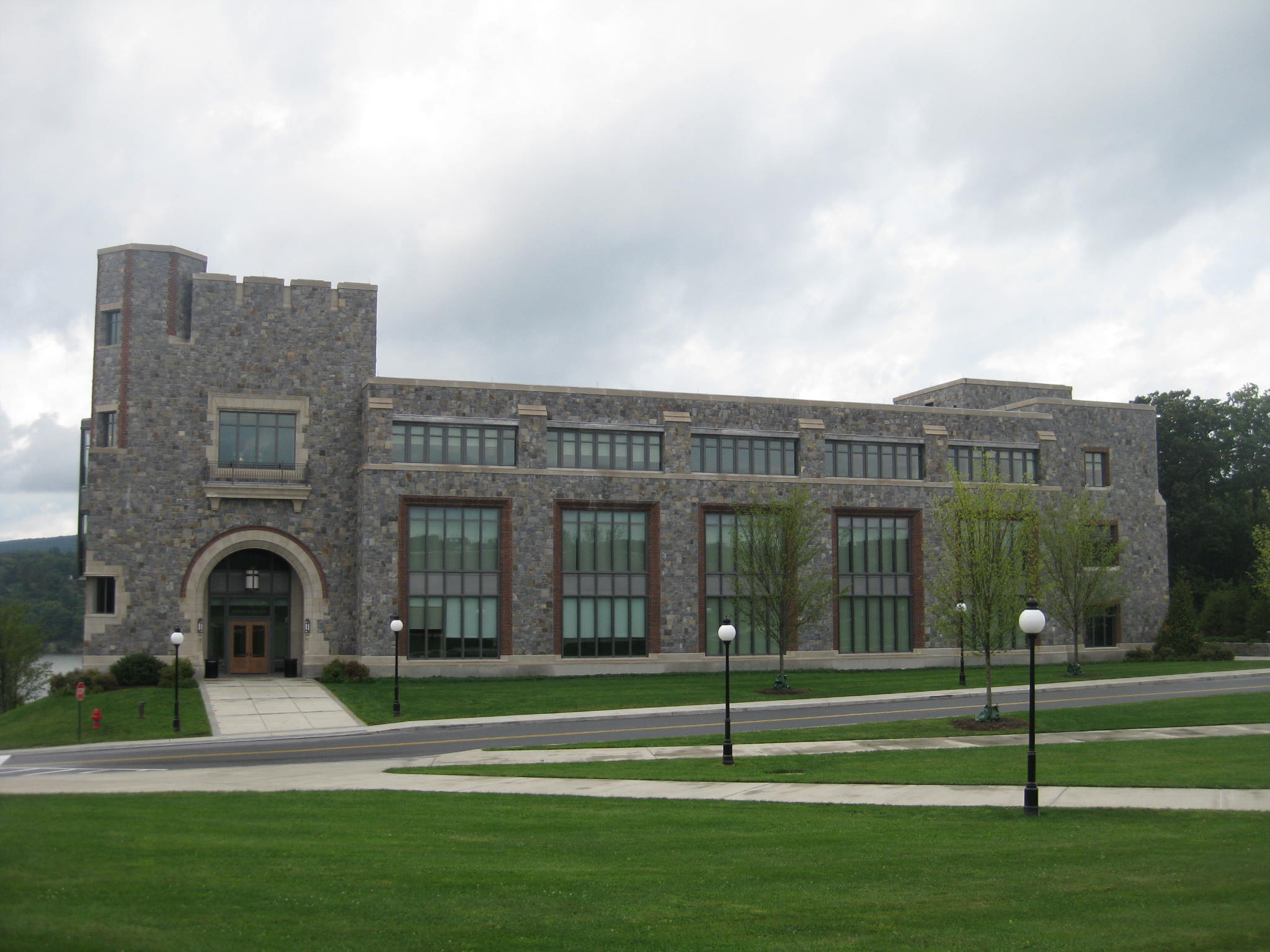
Marist University Hancock Center

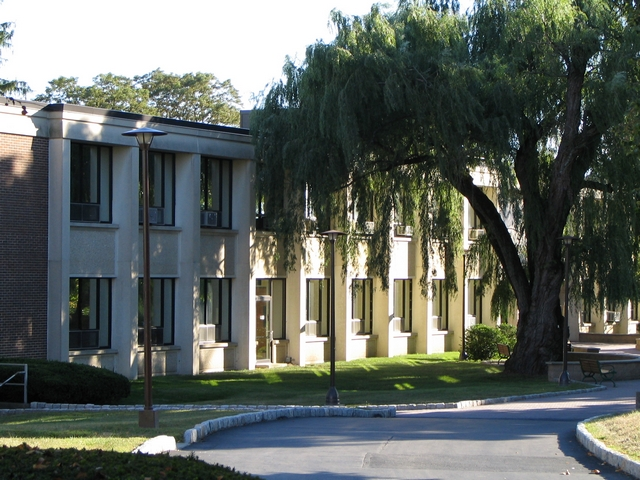
Taconic Hall of Dutchess Community College

Vassar College, Dutchess Community College, and Marist University are located in the town of Poughkeepsie.

Sections of the town are in several school districts: Arlington Central, Spackenkill Union Free, Hyde Park Central, and Wappingers Central. The first Arlington High School was in Poughkeepsie before being moved to the more rural Lagrangeville.

Our Lady of Lourdes High School is a private, co-educational, Catholic high school located at a former IBM site on Boardman Road.

Poughkeepsie Day School is an independent, co-educational, day school for students from pre-kindergarten (3 years) through grade 12, located at another former IBM site on Boardman Road.

Oakwood Friends School is a private, co-educational middle school and high school located near the western end of State Route 113 (Spackenkill Road).

== Geography ==
According to the United States Census Bureau, the town has a total area of 31.2 square miles (80.7 km^{2}), of which 28.5 square miles (73.9 km^{2}) is land and 2.6 square miles (6.8 km^{2}), or 8.44%, is water.

The Hudson River, which marks the boundary of the Ulster County towns of Lloyd and Marlborough and the Orange County town of Newburgh, forms the majority of the western border of the town. The City of Poughkeepsie occupies the remainder of the town's western border. The town is bordered by Hyde Park to the north, Pleasant Valley to the northeast, LaGrange to the east, and Wappinger to the southeast.

U.S. Route 9, U.S. Route 44 and State Route 55 pass through the town.

== Government and emergency services ==
=== Government ===
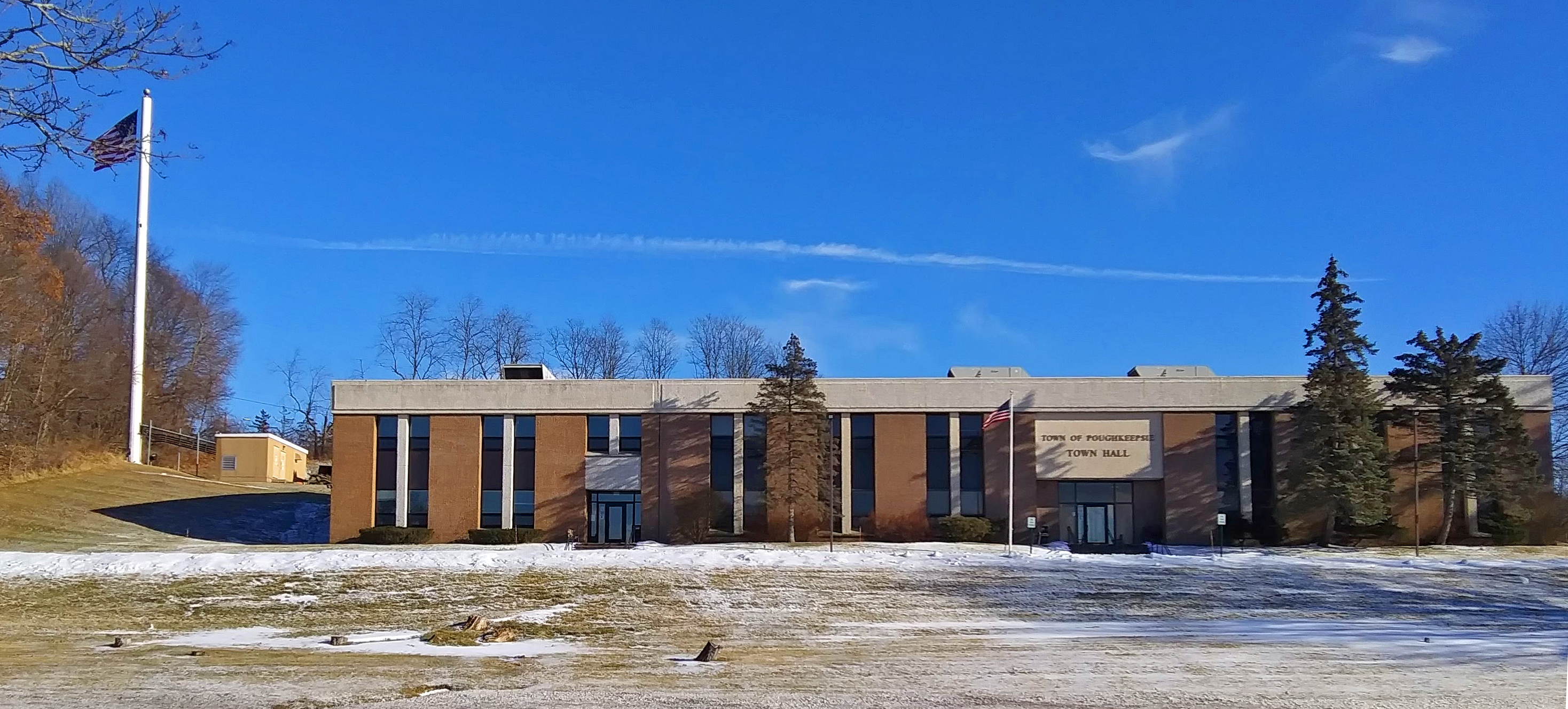
Town hall

The town of Poughkeepsie operates under a council–manager form of government. The Town Supervisor is the chief administrative officer of the town and village, selected to carry out the directives of the council. The Deputy Supervisor monitors the town's fiscal condition and enforces its ordinances and laws. The Town Supervisor is also involved in the discussion of all matters coming before council yet has no final vote. The Town Board is the legislative body consisting of the Town Supervisor and five council members. The Town Supervisor serves as the presiding officer of the council. The council functions to set policy, approve the annual budget and enact local laws, resolutions and ordinances. The Town Supervisor and Town Clerk are elected officials, as are the Town Council members from the six wards of the town.

=== Fire ===
Three fire departments cover the town of Poughkeepsie: the Arlington Fire District covers most of the town, from the southern end to the LaGrange line, from the city line north, the Fairview Fire Department covers a small 4-mile (6 km) section in the northern section of the town near MidHudson Regional Hospital, and the New Hamburg Fire Department covers the south end. The fire districts operate a total of seven fire stations spread out over the town, as their district covers a very large area. The departments are capable of handling fires, rescues, extrications and natural disasters. The departments operate a varied fire apparatus fleet, along with basic life support and advanced life support emergency medical services (EMS) within the Arlington Fire District. Within the Fairview section, Mobile Life Support Services is contracted to handle advanced life support calls. All EMS transports in the New Hamburg Fire District are covered by Mobile Life Support Services through a contract with the town of Poughkeepsie.

=== Police ===
Police protection is provided by the Town of Poughkeepsie Police Department. When someone calls 911, the call is routed to the Dutchess 911 center in the town of Hyde Park, and they route it to the town police department's communications center, who then dispatch the closest unit(s) based on a GPS map.

=== Medical ===
The Mid-Hudson Regional Hospital of Westchester Medical Center is located in the town, and Vassar Brothers Medical Center is located a mile away in the city of Poughkeepsie.

== Demographics ==
Historical population
Census	Pop.	Note	%±
1790	2,529		—
1820	5,726		—
1830	7,222		26.1%
1840	10,006		38.5%
1850	13,944		39.4%
1860	3,122		−77.6%
1870	4,009		28.4%
1880	4,628		15.4%
1890	4,782		3.3%
1900	6,820		42.6%
1910	8,626		26.5%
1920	10,519		21.9%
1930	12,707		20.8%
1940	14,495		14.1%
1950	19,984		37.9%
1960	32,164		60.9%
1970	41,087		27.7%
1980	39,549		−3.7%
1990	40,143		1.5%
2000	42,777		6.6%
2010	43,341		1.3%
2020	45,471		4.9%
U.S. Decennial Census

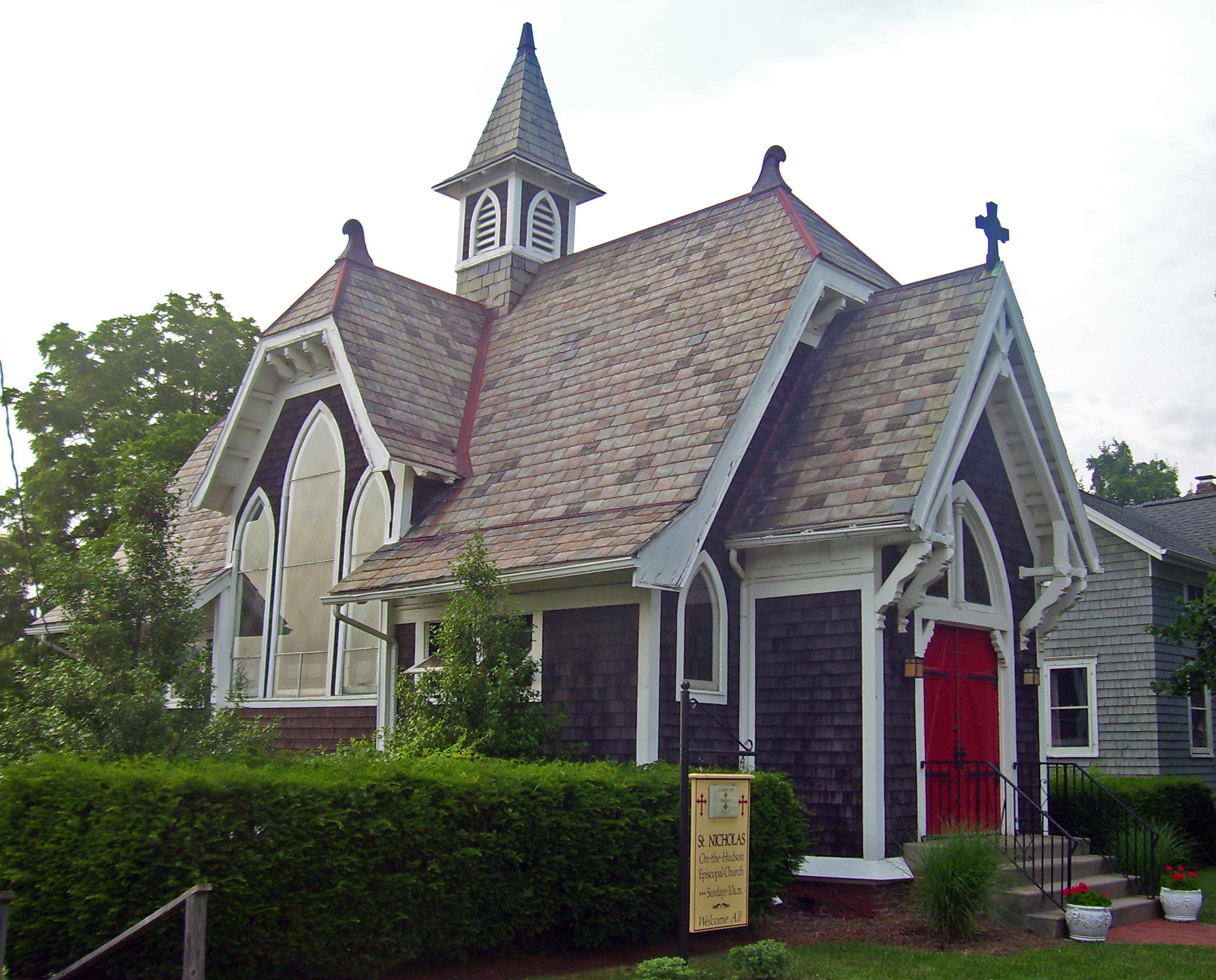
St. Nicholas-on-the-Hudson

As of the census of 2000, there were 42,777 people, 14,605 households, and 10,121 families residing in the town. The population density was 1,487.5 inhabitants per square mile (574.3/km^{2}). There were 15,132 housing units at an average density of 526.2 per square mile (203.2/km^{2}). The racial makeup of the town was 63.01% White, 38.07% Black or African American, 0.14% Native American, 5.13% Asian, 0.02% Pacific Islander, 1.62% from other races, and 2.00% from two or more races. Hispanic or Latino of any race were 5.27% of the population.

There were 14,605 households, out of which 32.9% had children under the age of 18 living with them, 55.8% were married couples living together, 9.6% had a female householder with no husband present, and 30.7% were non-families. 25.0% of all households were made up of individuals, and 9.6% had someone living alone who was 65 years of age or older. The average household size was 2.57 and the average family size was 3.10.

In the town, the population was spread out, with 22.6% under the age of 18, 16.9% from 18 to 24, 26.4% from 25 to 44, 21.3% from 45 to 64, and 12.9% who were 65 years of age or older. The median age was 35 years. For every 100 females, there were 91.8 males. For every 100 females age 18 and over, there were 88.3 males.

The median income for a household in the town was $55,327, and the median income for a family was $65,258. Males had a median income of $46,701 versus $31,005 for females. The per capita income for the town was $23,589. About 3.3% of families and 5.7% of the population were below the poverty line, including 5.6% of those under age 18 and 5.0% of those age 65 or over.

== Transportation ==
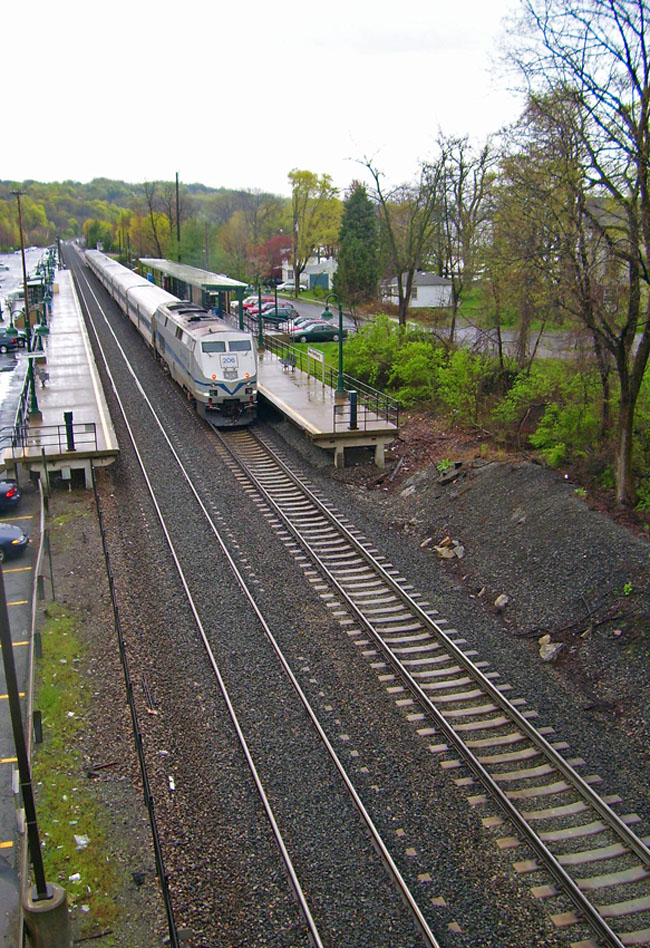
New Hamburg Metro-North station

=== Rail ===
Amtrak, the national passenger rail system, provides regular service to Poughkeepsie city. Poughkeepsie also has commuter rail service to New York City via the Hudson Line (Metro-North).

=== Bus ===
Dutchess County Public Transit bus system provides service throughout the town.

== Communities and locations in or near the town of Poughkeepsie ==
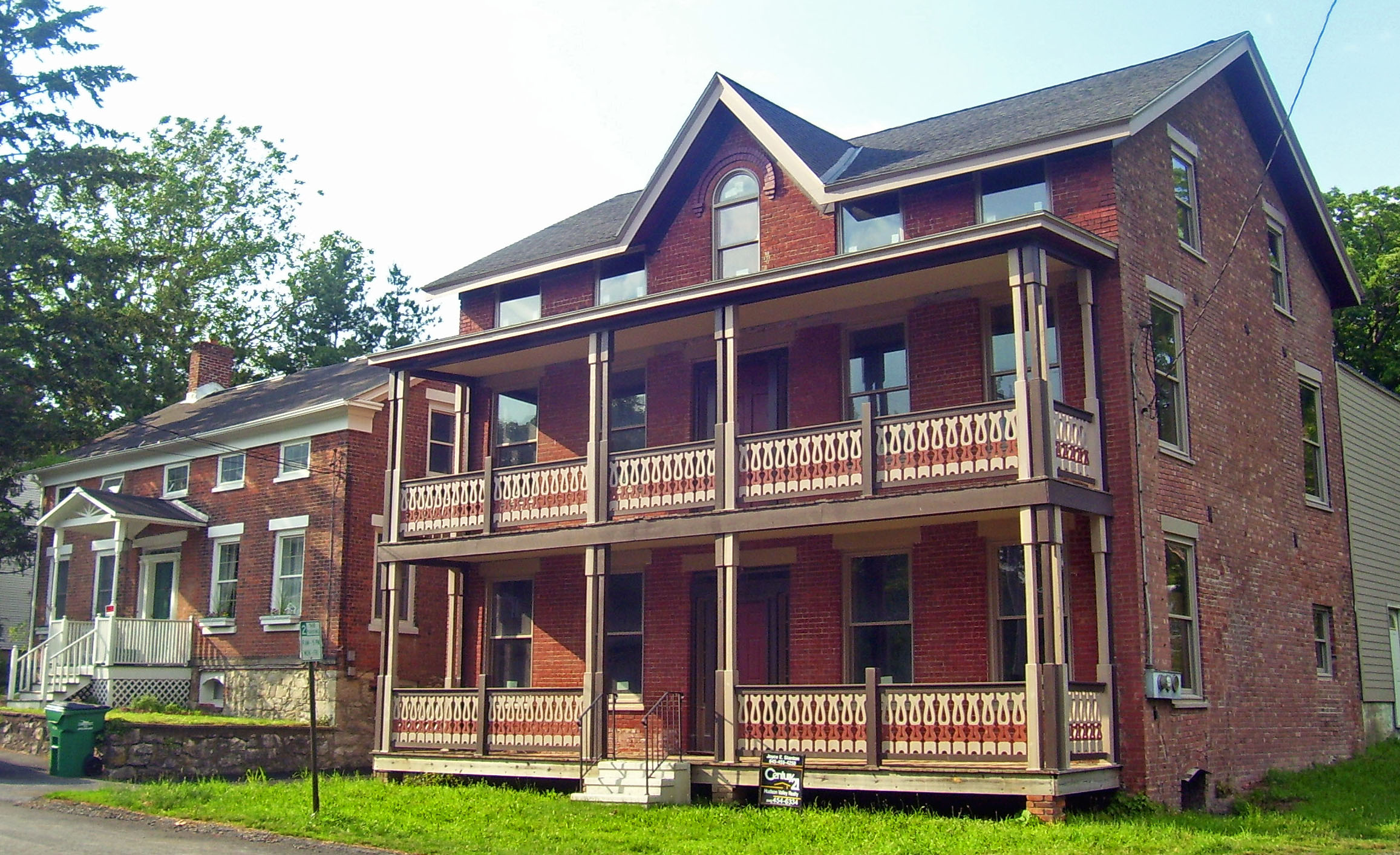
Houses in the Main Street Historic District

- Arlington – A suburb that is located in the town, east of the city line. The Arlington Central School District takes its name from the area.
- Barnegat – A location in the southwestern part of the town.
- Colonial Heights – A hamlet west of Rochdale.
- Clark Heights – A location at the northeastern town line in Pleasant Valley. (Home of the Boy)
- Crown Heights – A hamlet on the western side of the town.
- Fairview – A community in the northern part of the town that borders the northern city line.
- MacDonnell Heights – A hamlet southwest of Rochdale.
- New Hamburg – A small hamlet along the Hudson River that is home to a popular marina and a busy Metro-North train station. Adjacent to Wappingers Falls, the hamlet is the southwesternmost point in the town.
- Poughkeepsie – The town of Poughkeepsie wraps around the city of Poughkeepsie in a crescent shape.
- Red Oaks Mill - A suburb located southeast of the city. The area borders Spackenkill on the east and centers on the intersection of Vassar Road (Dutchess County 77), Spackenkill Road (New York State Route 113) and New Hackensack Road (New York State Route 376). A small, residential side street also feeds into the intersection.
- Rochdale – A hamlet by the eastern town line, sandwiched between Arlington and Pleasant Valley.
- Rudco – Once a small parcel of farmland before World War II, it was purchased in 1942 by IBM to expand upon.
- Spackenkill – Hamlet located in the town occupies the area south of the city line, including the Hagantown and Kingwood Park neighborhoods. The Spackenkill Union Free School District takes its name from the area. An IBM plant is also located in the area, and many of its employees live in Spackenkill.
- Van Keurens – Hamlet; this land is mostly taken over by the Clinton Point Quarry, owned by Tilcon, Inc.
- Wappingers Falls – A small part of the Village of Wappingers Falls is in the southern part of the town.

== Notable people ==
- Bill Duke, actor
- Taylor Jardine, lead singer for We Are The In Crowd
- Jeh Johnson, United States Secretary of Homeland Security (Cottam Hill)
- Johnny Miller, pioneering aviator, brother of Lee Miller
- Lee Miller, Vogue photographer and World War II correspondent
- Samuel Morse, American painter who turned inventor
- Matthew Vassar of England, who died at his namesake Vassar College

== See also ==
- Arlington Fire District
- National Register of Historic Places listings in Poughkeepsie, New York
