= Spackenkill High School =

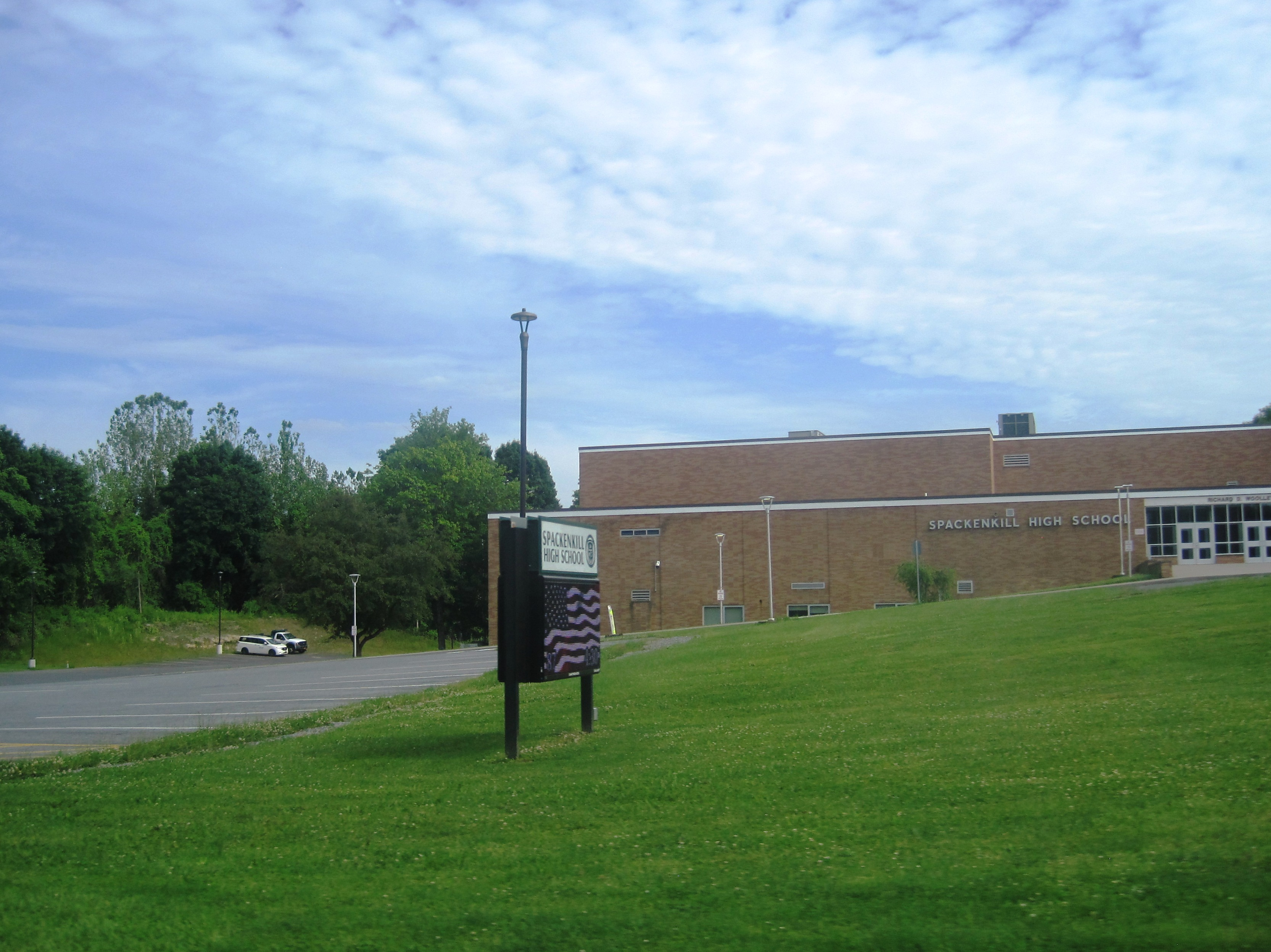
- Front of the school from NY 113

Location
- 112 Spackenkill Road; Poughkeepsie Town, New York 12603; United States; 41.6589°N 73.9125°W

Information
- Type: Public, High School
- Established: 1973; 53 years ago
- Superintendent: Paul M. Fanuele
- Principal: Kenneth Lewis
- Teaching staff: 53.02 (FTE)
- Grades: 9-12
- Enrollment: 537 (2024–2025)
- Student to teacher ratio: 10.13
- Colors: Green, white and black
- Mascot: The Spackenkill Spartan
- Team name: Spartans
- Newspaper: Spack News
- Website: hs.spackenkillschools.org

Spackenkill High School is a 9-12 public high school part of the Spackenkill Union Free School District located in the town of Poughkeepsie, New York, United States. It is a part of the Spackenkill Union Free School District.

In 2018, it was named a National Blue Ribbon School, one of 62 high schools nationwide to be recognized that year by the U.S. Department of Education. In athletics, Spackenkill has won three state championships: baseball in 2005 and 2022 and boys soccer in 2007.

The school district (of which this is the sole comprehensive high school) includes a majority of the Crown Heights and Spackenkill census-designated places (hamlets).

== History ==
Spackenkill Union Free School District was chartered by the New York State Legislature in 1865 and is one of the few remaining union free school districts within the state. The name Spackenkill stems from Spack's Creek. Spackenkill is a Dutch interpretation of the Indian words for "speaking waters."

Spackenkill High School was established in 1973, after a referendum was passed, since residents of the area disliked the idea of their children transferring to Poughkeepsie High School after graduating from Orville A. Todd Middle School. Though the proposition was questioned, the majority of the residents passed it to purchase land for a high school, a necessity for the fast-growing Spackenkill School District. Construction began in 1970, and ended in 1973. The first class graduated in 1974. In 2018, it was one of 62 high schools nationwide to be named a National Blue Ribbon School by the U.S. Department of Education. The award recognizes exemplary schools, using standards of excellence evidenced by student achievement measures.

Spackenkill's recent construction includes the adding of a new elevator, science classrooms, conference rooms, and a black box theatre. The high school is also adding additional wings, windows, art rooms, weight rooms and renovations to the library.

== School profile ==
Spackenkill is a four-year public school, having open enrollment and offering a strong college preparation program. Vocational programs are offered through Dutchess County BOCES. If a student wishes, he or she is able to participate in a bridging program compatible with Dutchess County Community College, and other colleges in the area. Additional courses are available to students who wish to achieve a higher level of education through Poughkeepsie High School, over the period of summer vacation for all students who reside in the Spackenkill District. Spackenkill's overall test average compared to other schools in New York from 0 (worst) to 100 (best) is 96 (+1.0 z-score) Thirteen Advanced Placement Courses are offered throughout the year. The school population is 540 with over 60 faculty members. Spackenkill High School was named in Newsweek's list of the Best High Schools in America from 2008–2012.

== Community ==
Spackenkill High School is located in the Town of Poughkeepsie, New York, a middle to upper class suburb roughly 70 miles north of New York City. The district is composed almost entirely of single-family dwellings. A large proportion of the district's residents are well educated with a strong commitment to students and their education. One of the largest IBM Corporation facilities in the country is located within the district. Vassar College, Marist College and Dutchess Community College (DCC) are located within 10 miles of the high school.

== Athletics ==
Spackenkill High School's teams are known as the Spartans. They play in Section IX of the NYSPHSAA, and are a Class B school in most sports as of 2010. The school's teams have won the following titles:

- Baseball (2005, 2022, 2024): NYSPHSAA CLASS B state championships under Coach Don Neise.
- Boys Soccer (2007): state championship, under the school's long-time soccer coach, Manny Blanco (2007).
- Girls Softball (2014): Varsity girls softball team won its first divisional championship with a 6-0 divisional record.
- Football (2021): Section IX Championship
- Girls Volleyball: In 2005, 2014, 2016, 2017, and 2022 the Girls varsity volleyball team won the section IX title. In 2013, 2016, 2017, and 2022 they were league champions. And in 2014, the girls were state finalists.
