= Stone Street Historic District =

Stone Street Historic District may refer to:

- Stone Street Historic District, centered around Stone Street (Manhattan), New York City
- Stone Street Historic District (New Hamburg, New York)
