= New York State Route 202 =

New York State Route 202 may refer to:

- New York State Route 202 (1930–1935) in Dutchess County
- U.S. Route 202 in New York, the only route numbered "202" in New York since 1935
