= Crown Heights (disambiguation) =

Crown Heights is a neighborhood of the New York City borough of Brooklyn.

Crown Heights may also refer to:

  - Crown Heights riot, a 1991 race riot in Crown Heights Brooklyn
  - Crown Heights – Utica Avenue (IRT Eastern Parkway Line), a subway station in the neighborhood
- Crown Heights, New York, a hamlet on the west side of the town of Poughkeepsie
- Crown Heights (film), a 2017 film written and directed by Matt Ruskin
- Crown Heights Affair, an American R&B / funk / disco group
