= Beacon station =

Railroad station in Beacon, New York, US

Beacon
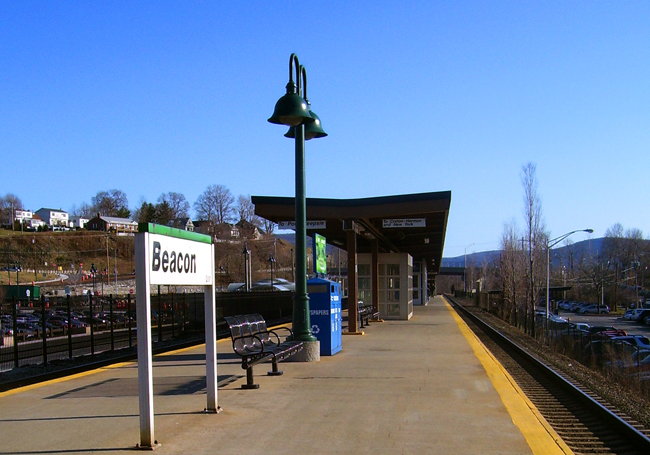
- View south down the island platform

General information
- Location: 1 Ferry Plaza; Beacon, New York
- Coordinates: 41.5064°N 73.9848°W
- Owner: Metro-North
- Line: Hudson Line
- Platforms: 1 island platform, 1 side platform
- Tracks: 3
- Connections: Dutchess County Public Transit; Leprechaun Lines: Newburgh-Beacon Bridge Shuttle

Construction
- Parking: Yes
- Cycle facilities: Yes
- Accessible: yes

Other information
- Fare zone: 8

History
- Opened: 1850s (HRR)
- Rebuilt: –November 21, 1915 (NYC & CNE)
- Former names: Fishkill Landing (HRR)

Passengers
- 2018: 2,828 (Metro-North)
- Rank: 21 of 109

Services
Preceding station	Metro-North Railroad	Following station
New Hamburg toward Poughkeepsie	Hudson Line limited service	Breakneck Ridge toward Grand Central
New Hamburg toward Poughkeepsie	Hudson Line	Cold Spring toward Grand Central

Former services
Preceding station	New York Central Railroad	Following station
Chelsea toward Chicago	Main Line	Dutchess toward New York
Location

Beacon station is a commuter rail station on the Metro-North Railroad Hudson Line located in Beacon, New York. The station has three tracks, with one island platform and one side platform.

== History ==
=== 19th century ===
Rail service in Beacon can be traced as far back as December 6, 1849, with the Hudson River Railroad. The station was originally named "Fishkill Landing," and like many others on the Hudson Line, it is also right on the Hudson River. On September 4, 1866, the Dutchess and Columbia Railroad was established with the hope of running from the south side of Fishkill Creek northeast and north to meet the New York and Harlem Railroad at Craryville, New York. This junction and the station were built south of Fishkill Landing, and would be known forever as Dutchess Junction. The first station at Dutchess Junction, which was shared by the NYC&HR and D&C was burned down in April 1876, and rebuilt. The railroad along the river was acquired by the New York Central and Hudson River Railroad in November 1869. By 1877, the D&C was taken over by the Newburgh, Dutchess and Connecticut Railroad. In 1881 the New York and New England Railroad built a ferry port near Fishkill Landing station, and added a connecting spur along the north side of the Fishkill Creek (now known as the Beacon Secondary) leading to what became Wickopee Junction, and turned it over to the ND&C.

Dutchess Junction station would face another fire in 1893, and was replaced by little more than a sheltered shed which lasted only into the 1950s. The New York and New England ferry terminal was bought by the New York, New Haven and Hartford Railroad, along with the rest of the NY&NE in 1898.

=== 20th century ===
In 1905 the New York, New Haven and Hartford Railroad acquired the ND&C, and in 1907 merged it into the Central New England Railway, which itself was acquired by the New Haven Railroad system in 1904, and allowed to operate under its own name until 1927. In the meantime the NYC&HR became the New York Central Railroad System in 1914.

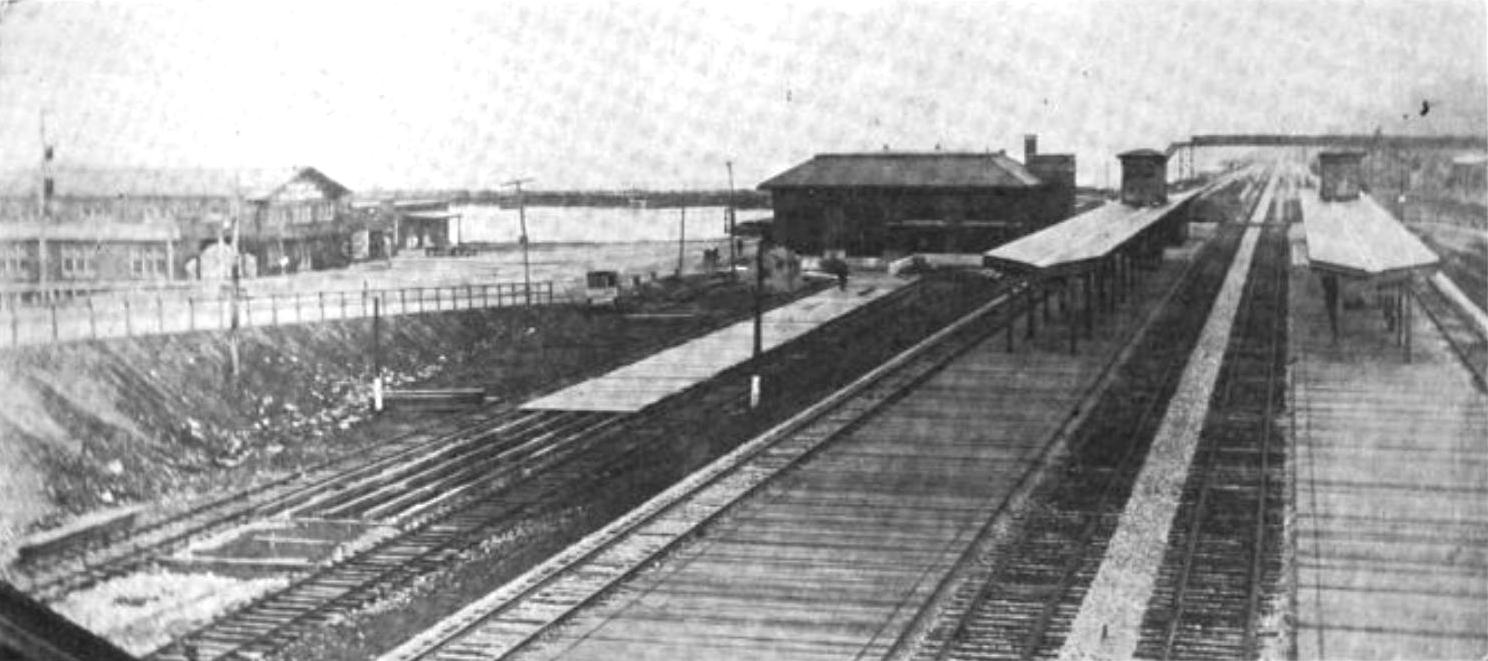
Beacon station in 1916

Between 1913 and 1915, the original HRR line was realigned, and the station was rebuilt in order to accommodate both the Hudson Division of the New York Central Railroad and the connecting spur of the ND&C along the north side of Fishkill Creek. Since Fishkill Landing was consolidated into the City of Beacon in 1913, the new station would be called Beacon as well. Additionally, the station also contained a new ferry dock designed for trains, passengers, and eventually cars. By 1916, the ND&C was moved from the southeast side of Fishkill Creek to the north side of the creek, and the original section between Dutchess Junction and Wickopee Junction was gradually abandoned in the 1930s. The New Haven Railroad continued to gradually reduce service along the ND&C, although they never completely eliminated service. In 1930 the ferry route officially became part of New York State Route 52.

The decline in railroad service during the post-WW II era affected Beacon station as it did with much of the country, but other forces also put the station at risk. Winter freezes along the Hudson (including one that stranded a ferry boat in the Hudson River), and the construction of the Newburgh–Beacon Bridge brought ferry service at the station to an end. New York Central merged with their long time rival Pennsylvania Railroad in 1968 to form Penn Central Railroad, then acquired the New York, New Haven and Hartford Railroad in 1969, including the former ND&C. Amtrak took over intercity passenger service in 1971, but Beacon station continued to serve only Penn Central Hudson Line commuter trains which by that time ran to Poughkeepsie and was subsidized by the MTA beginning in 1972. A fire in 1976 destroyed the station built by New York Central in 1913, which was demolished later that year to create more parking capacity. Conrail took over Penn Central in 1976 continued to operate Hudson Line trains until Metro-North Commuter Railroad assumed operation in 1983.

=== 21st century ===
On October 17, 2005, ferry service to the station from Newburgh resumed after 42 years in which the Newburgh–Beacon Bridge had sufficed to bring people across the river. This has allowed the MTA to essentially increase the available parking for the station with little new construction due to the availability of land on the Newburgh waterfront. The fare is $1.75 per person each way; unlike Beacon, parking in Newburgh is free. Those purchasing monthly train passes also have the option to include the Newburgh-Beacon ferry in their ticket. Rail and ferry service at Beacon was severely disrupted by Hurricane Irene in 2011 and Hurricane Sandy in 2012, but not obliterated.

On March 27, 2023, the Track 3 side platform opened for passenger service after a full reconstruction, and is accessible from the south end of the eastern parking lot, including via ADA-compliant ramps. Track 3 had a temporary platform built during a renovation project in the 1990s, though it was removed when the project was completed; the new platform was built atop the preexisting support structure. In 2025, the MTA selected Jonathan Rose Companies to develop a 265-unit apartment complex on the station's northern parking lot. The building will include a garage with 573 spaces, the same size as the current parking lot.
