= Chelsea station (New York) =

Chelsea

General information
- Coordinates: 41°33′16″N 73°58′7″W
- System: New York Central Railroad
- Line: Main Line

History
- Opened: 31 December 1849
- Closed: 2 July 1973

Services
Preceding station	New York Central Railroad	Following station
New Hamburg toward Chicago	Main Line	Beacon toward New York
Location

Chelsea was a railroad station in Dutchess County, New York on the New York Central Railroad Main Line. It served the community of Chelsea, NY, a hamlet in Dutchess County, New York and the surrounding areas until 1973, when it was closed by Penn Central Transportation Company due to low ridership.

== History ==
On December 31, 1849, the Hudson River Railroad began service from New York City to Albany, NY, with the Chelsea station located between Beacon station and New Hamburg station.

The station eventually became a flag stop. On July 2, 1973, the station was closed due to low ridership along with Oscawana, Dutchess, New Hamburg, and Manitou, the other flag stations on the line.
