= Spackenkill Union Free School District =

School district in New York, United States

- 15 Croft Road Poughkeepsie, New York, 12603

District information
- Type: Public
- Grades: K–12
- NCES District ID: 3606500

Students and staff
- Students: 1,501
- Teachers: 147.53
- Staff: 118.06
- Student–teacher ratio: 10.17

Other information
- Website: www.spackenkillschools.org

The Spackenkill Union Free School District, also known as Spackenkill School District, is a New York school district in the town of Poughkeepsie, New York.

It includes a majority of the Crown Heights and Spackenkill census-designated places (hamlets).

The Spackenkill UFSD has four schools and has about 1,500 students district wide. The current Superintendent is Dr. Paul Fanuele.

== History of Spackenkill ==
The Spackenkill Union Free School District was chartered by the New York State Legislature in 1865 and is one of about 130 remaining union free school districts within the state. The uniqueness of remaining independent without centralization with other districts has helped Spackenkill remain a small and close-knit school district.

The name Spackenkill stems from Spack's Creek. Spackenkill is a Dutch interpretation of the Native American phrase "speaking waters", which was given to a noisy stream running through Spackenkill Road, located just across the street from the present Croft Corners Fire Company.

The district's first school building was on the site of the present firehouse and was built in 1866 or 1867. It was a traditional one-room schoolhouse built of bricks brought from the Netherlands as ballast in sailing vessels.

Beginning in 1912, older pupils were sent outside the district to continue their education. By 1920 the one-room schoolhouse was overcrowded with an enrollment of 55 pupils, and plans were made for a new building. In 1926 classes met in two rooms of the new building.

In the 1940s, population growth made it imperative for the district to increase its facilities. An addition was built on Spackenkill School (later renamed the Martha W. Lawrence School after the first principal) and property was purchased to allow for further expansion. The Croft Road Junior High School (later renamed the Orville A. Todd Junior High School) opened in 1959. In 1993, it became the Orville A. Todd Middle School. Rapid population growth made the purchase of two additional sites advisable. One site was the location of the Nassau Elementary School, which opened in 1962. Hagan Elementary School was built on the second site in the Hagantown development in 1962. In 1967, the residents passed, by an overwhelming majority, a referendum to purchase land for a high school. The New York State Department of Education moved to block the construction, and the Spackenkill District responded by filing a lawsuit. The district ultimately prevailed, and construction began in 1970. Spackenkill High School graduated its first class in 1974.

Under the leadership of superintendent Dr. Mark Villanti and support from the Board of Education, a 24 million dollar capital project was passed by the community in 2017. Improvements included a brand new athletic facility at Spackenkill High School and new roofing at all schools. In the summer of 2020, the new athletic facility officially opened to the public.

In 2019 Villante left his position due to retirement, and Paul Fanuele replaced him; Fanuele was principal of Arlington High School.

== Nassau and Hagan Elementary schools ==
The Spackenkill district hosts two primary schools, using a grade-level school format. Nassau Elementary School, which hosts grades K through 2, and Hagan Elementary School, which is for grades 3 through 5. Nassau Elementary School is run by principal Erik Lynch and houses about 300 students, while Hagan Elementary School also contains approximately 300 students and its principal is Clinton DeSouza. Between the 1994-1995 and 2012-2013 school years, both schools taught Kindergarten through grade 5, prior to the 1994–1995 school year they included grade 6 before being moved to the then renamed Orville A. Todd Middle School. They have now switched to a grade-level school format.

== Orville A. Todd Middle School (TMS) ==
Orville A. Todd Middle School is the middle school within the district. The school was named after the long-time district principal, Orville A. Todd. Its principal is Daniel Doherty and the Assistant Principal is Dustyn Cormier. It serves grades 6–8.

Prior to the 1994–1995 school year, the school was called the Orville A. Todd Junior High School serving only grades 7 and 8. In that school year, grade 6 was moved from the elementary schools and the school was renamed as a middle school.

== Spackenkill High School (SHS) ==
Students attend Spackenkill High School starting in grade 9. This school serves grades 9–12. It is located near Vassar College, Marist College, and Dutchess Community College. Its principal is Steven Malkischer and the assistant principal is Ken Lewis. Its soccer team won the state championship in 2007. Its baseball team won the district's first state championship in 2005 and won a second state championship in 2022. Spackenkill High School is a 2018 National Blue Ribbon School as named by the U.S. Department of Education.

== NYS math scores ==
In the district, 35 percent of the 136 third graders passed the New York State Math Test. In the fourth grade 132 students were tested and 16 percent of them passed. In the fifth grade 123 students were tested and 90 percent of them passed. In the sixth grade 33% of the 139 tested passed their New York State Math Test. There were 129 seventh graders tested and 25 percent passed. One hundred forty-five eighth graders were tested and 15% passed.

== NYS ELA scores ==
In the district, 35% of the 133 third graders tested passed the ELA test. One hundred twenty-five fourth graders in the district were tested and 20% passed the ELA test. Of the 134 fifth graders tested 21% passed the ELA test. One hundred thirty-one sixth graders were tested and 40% passed. Of the 143 seventh graders tested 18% passed. One hundred fifty-seven eighth graders were tested and 28% passed. A month prior to testing, Spackenkill teachers often tutor students before and after classes to prepare them. Many teachers even offer their students tutoring in their home for a nominal fee.

== Activities ==
The more popular sports in the school district include football, basketball, soccer, crew, tennis, and baseball. There are approximately 25 clubs, mostly at the middle and high school. Clubs include Youth Leadership, Student Government, LEO Club, National Honor Club, and Odyssey of the Mind. Recent field trips have included a 5th grade trip to SHARPE reservation in Fishkill, NY, a 4th grade Albany field trip and an 8th grade Washington, D.C. trip. The music department includes band, strings, a jazz band, drumline, string ensemble, and a mixed chorus.

== Notable alumni ==
- Bion Tsang, musician and educator
- Hevad Khan, professional poker player
