= New York State Route 113 =

State highway in Dutchess County, New York, US

New York State Route 113
- Spackenkill Road
- Map of the Poughkeepsie area with NY 113 highlighted in red

Route information
- Maintained by NYSDOT
- Length: 3.18 mi (5.12 km)
- Existed: April 1, 1980–present

Major junctions
- West end: US 9 / Spackenkill Road in Poughkeepsie
- East end: NY 376 / CR 77 in Red Oaks Mill

Location
- Country: United States
- State: New York
- Counties: Dutchess

Highway system
- New York Highways; Interstate; US; State; Reference; Parkways
← NY 113	→ NY 114

New York State Route 113 (NY 113) is an east–west state highway located southeast of the city of Poughkeepsie in Dutchess County, New York, in the United States. The western terminus of the route is at an interchange with U.S. Route 9 (US 9) in the town of Poughkeepsie. Its eastern terminus is at a junction with NY 376 in the Poughkeepsie hamlet of Red Oaks Mill. NY 113 is known as Spackenkill Road for the majority of its length.

Spackenkill Road was initially maintained by Dutchess County. Jurisdiction of the highway was transferred to the state of New York in 1980, at which time it was designated NY 113. Only minor realignments have occurred since.

== Route description ==
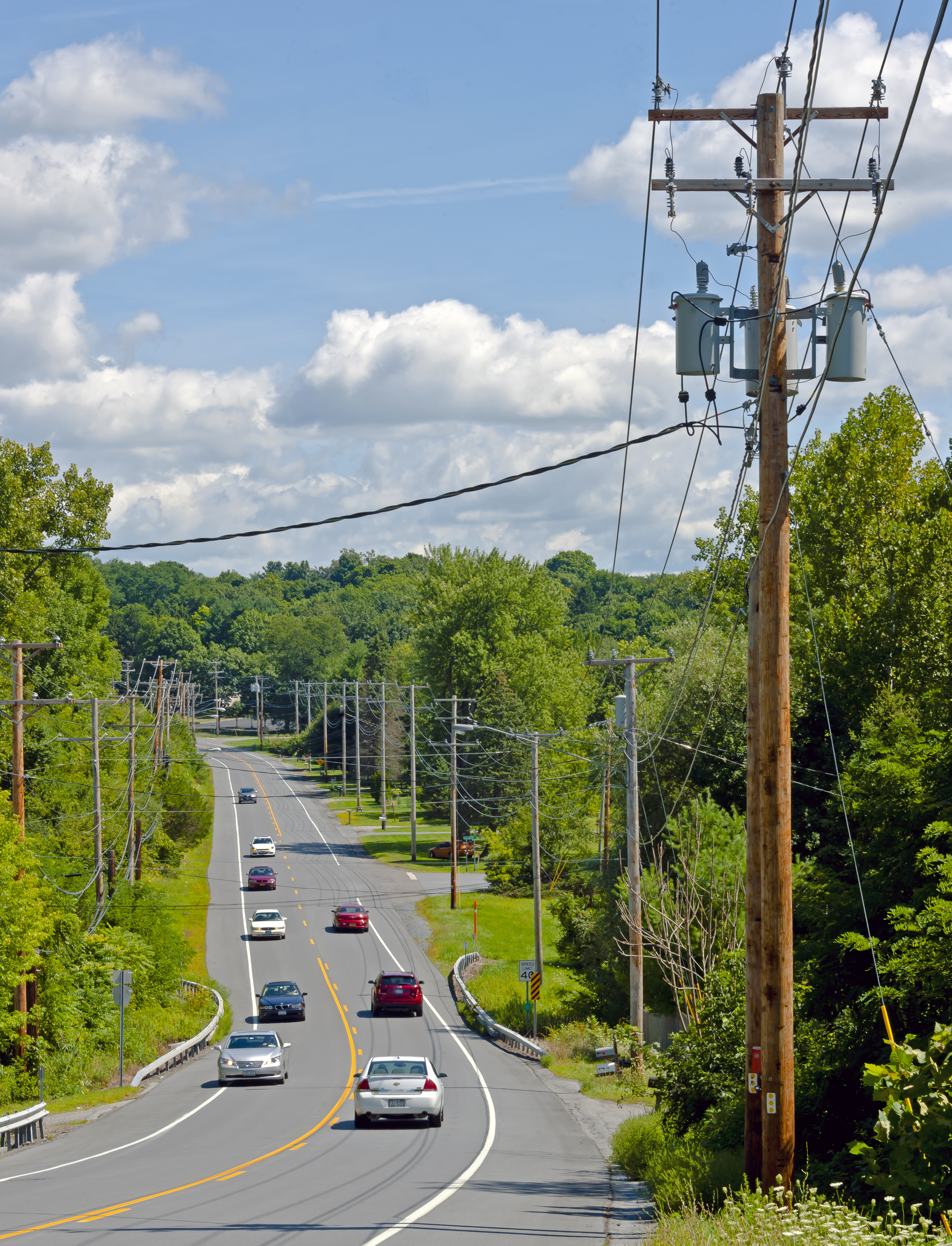
View east along road midway along length

NY 113 begins at a cloverleaf interchange with US 9 in the Dutchess County town of Poughkeepsie. West of the interchange, NY 113 continues south as Spackenkill Road into the IBM Poughkeepsie main plant.

Just before an intersection with Cedar Avenue (County Route 74 or CR 74), NY 113 passes by Spackenkill High School. The highway continues east through a residential portion of Poughkeepsie to the hamlet of Red Oaks Mill, where NY 113 ends at a junction with NY 376 (New Hackensack Road) and Vassar Road (CR 77).

== History ==
Spackenkill Road initially followed what is now IBM Road through the interchange with US 9 and into the IBM plant, where it ended at the CR 48 portion of IBM Road. The portion of Spackenkill Road from US 9 to NY 376 was initially maintained by Dutchess County as a county road. On April 1, 1980, ownership and maintenance of this segment of Spackenkill Road was transferred from Dutchess County to the state of New York as part of a larger highway maintenance swap between the two levels of government. The highway was then designated NY 113.

At some point, Spackenkill Road was realigned to follow its pre-interchange routing to US 9, which had been known as Old Spackenkill Road. The IBM Road name, which originally applied only to CR 48, was then extended north along the former Spackenkill Road.

=== Previous designation proposal for NY 113 ===
In the 1960s and 1970s, there were talks of building a north-south highway on Long Island between Port Jefferson and Westhampton Beach. As per the 1970 Nassau-Suffolk Regional Planning Board recommendation, the ownership of this route would have been transferred from Suffolk County to NYSDOT, resulting in the route being renamed as New York State Route 113. However, only a small segment was ever constructed, and the route was never transferred to the New York State DOT, resulting in the route maintaining its CR 111 designation.

== Major intersections ==
The entire route is in Dutchess County.

Location	mi	km	Destinations	Notes
Town of Poughkeepsie	0.00	0.00	Spackenkill Road – IBM	Continuation south
Town of Poughkeepsie	0.00	0.00	US 9	Interchange
Town of Poughkeepsie	3.18	5.12	NY 376 / CR 77 south – Dutchess County Airport	Northern terminus of CR 77; hamlet of Red Oaks Mill
1.000 mi = 1.609 km; 1.000 km = 0.621 mi
