= New York State Route 376 =

State highway in Dutchess County, New York, US

New York State Route 376
- Map of the Poughkeepsie area with NY 376 highlighted in red and NY 983T in blue

Route information
- Maintained by NYSDOT
- Length: 13.87 mi (22.32 km)
- Existed: 1935–present

Major junctions
- South end: NY 52 in East Fishkill
- North end: US 44 / NY 55 in Poughkeepsie

Location
- Country: United States
- State: New York
- Counties: Dutchess

Highway system
- New York Highways; Interstate; US; State; Reference; Parkways
← NY 375	→ NY 377

New York State Route 376 (NY 376) is a state highway located entirely within Dutchess County in the Hudson Valley region of New York in the United States. The route begins at an intersection with NY 52 in East Fishkill and passes north through Hopewell Junction and Red Oaks Mill on its way to the city of Poughkeepsie. It ends at a junction with U.S. Route 44 (US 44) and NY 55 east of the city limits in Arlington, a hamlet in the town of Poughkeepsie. NY 376 was originally designated as part of NY 39 in the mid-1920s. In the 1930 renumbering of state highways in New York, the East Fishkill–Poughkeepsie portion of NY 39 was renumbered to New York State Route 202. NY 202 was renumbered to NY 376 in 1935 to avoid numerical duplication with the new US 202.

== Route description ==
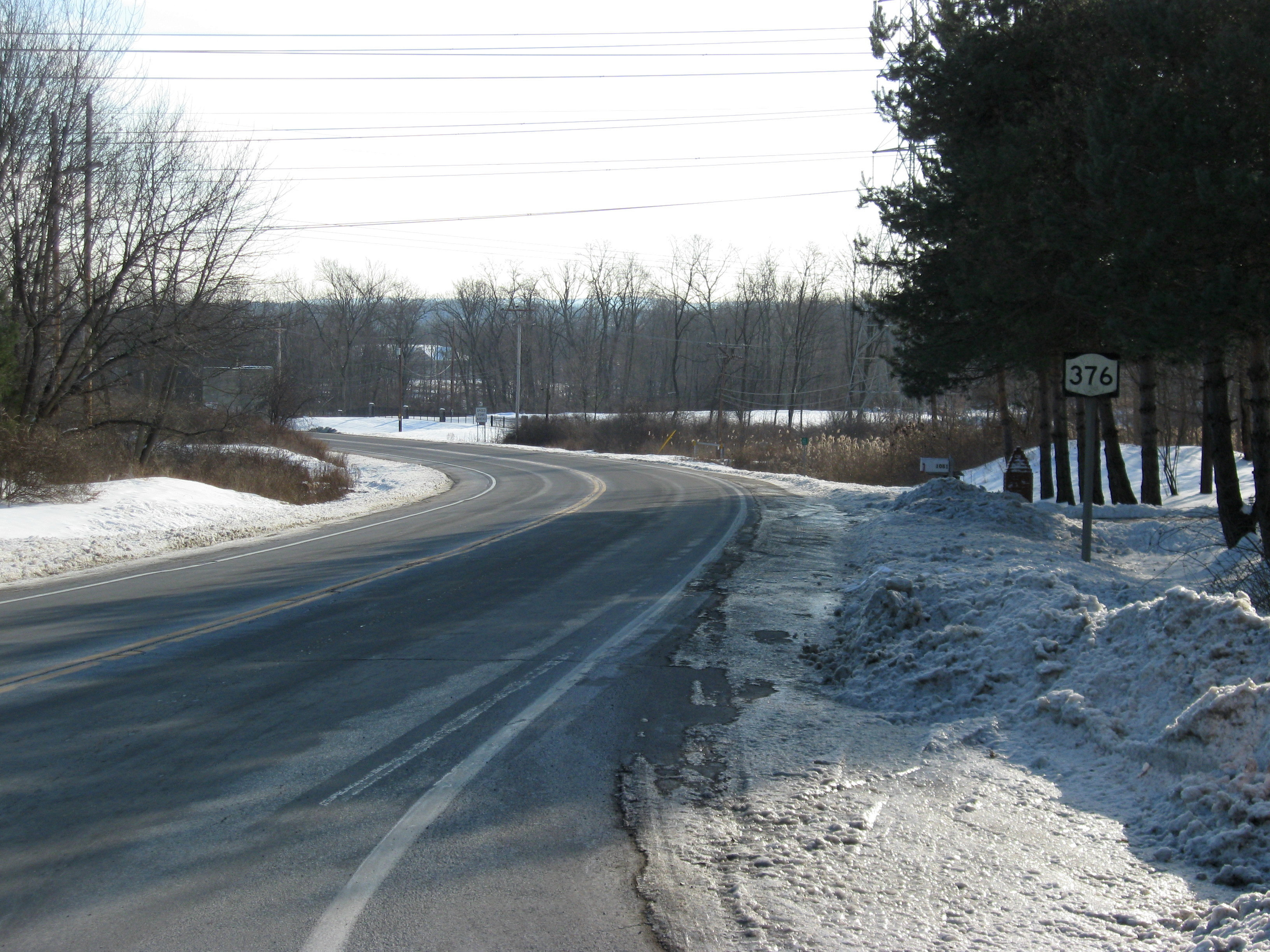
NY 376 southbound in Fishkill Plains

NY 376 begins at an intersection with NY 52 in the hamlet of East Fishkill. It proceeds north about 1.5 miles (2.4 km), crossing over Fishkill Creek and continuing into the hamlet of Hopewell Junction, where it overlaps with NY 82 for 450 feet (140 m). NY 376 leaves NY 82 and continues northwest, crossing railroad tracks and following a sharp 90° S-curve with a 5-mile-per-hour (8.0 km/h) advisory speed. Soon after, the route traverses another curve, but at 20 miles per hour (32 km/h). After this, the speed limit returns to 45 miles per hour (72 km/h). NY 376 passes by the Dogwood Knolls Country Club before meeting County Route 29 (CR 29) in the hamlet of Fishkill Plains, at which point NY 376 proceeds west.

Immediately after crossing from the town of East Fishkill into the town of Wappinger, NY 376 turns north at an intersection with CR 93. It continues north for about 1.2 miles (1.9 km) through the hamlet of Diddell, where it turns west again towards the hamlet of New Hackensack. Here, the route meets CR 94 and CR 104. NY 376 turns north at this intersection, running along the eastern perimeter of and providing access to the passenger terminal of Dutchess County Airport. North of the airport, NY 376 runs closely parallel to Wappinger Creek, briefly entering the town limits of La Grange before crossing the Wappinger Creek into the town of Poughkeepsie.

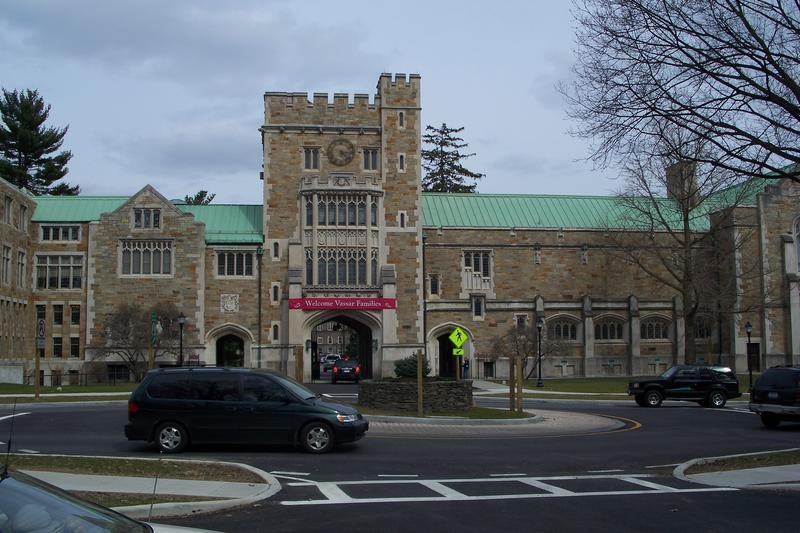
Roundabout on NY 376 at Vassar College

In the Poughkeepsie hamlet of Red Oaks Mill, NY 376 meets the eastern end of NY 113 (Spackenkill Road) and the northern end of CR 77 (Vassar Road) at the center of the community. NY 376 approaches the intersection at a 45-degree angle, resulting in a series of sharp traffic movements between the three roads—the sharpest being the 135-degree turn between NY 376 northbound and Vassar Road southbound. Past the junction, NY 376 continues north on New Hackensack Road, the northward continuation of Vassar Road. After heading north and northwest for 2.3 miles (3.7 km), NY 376 turns right onto Raymond Avenue at Vassar College. Its continuation on New Hackensack Road is known as Hooker Avenue and is designated NY 983T, an unsigned reference route, to the Poughkeepsie town/city line about 100 feet (30 m) from its junction with Cedar Avenue (known as CR 74 south of the city limits).

NY 376 follows Raymond Avenue for about a mile (1.6 km) to the hamlet of Arlington. Here, it meets US 44 and NY 55, both of which follow a one-way couplet along Haight Street (eastbound) and Maple Street (westbound) through the city of Poughkeepsie. In between the two streets, NY 376 intersects Main Street (CR 114). The route ends upon intersecting westbound US 44 and NY 55, at which point the routing of NY 376 becomes an unnumbered town road named Van Wagner Road.

== History ==
=== Route designation ===
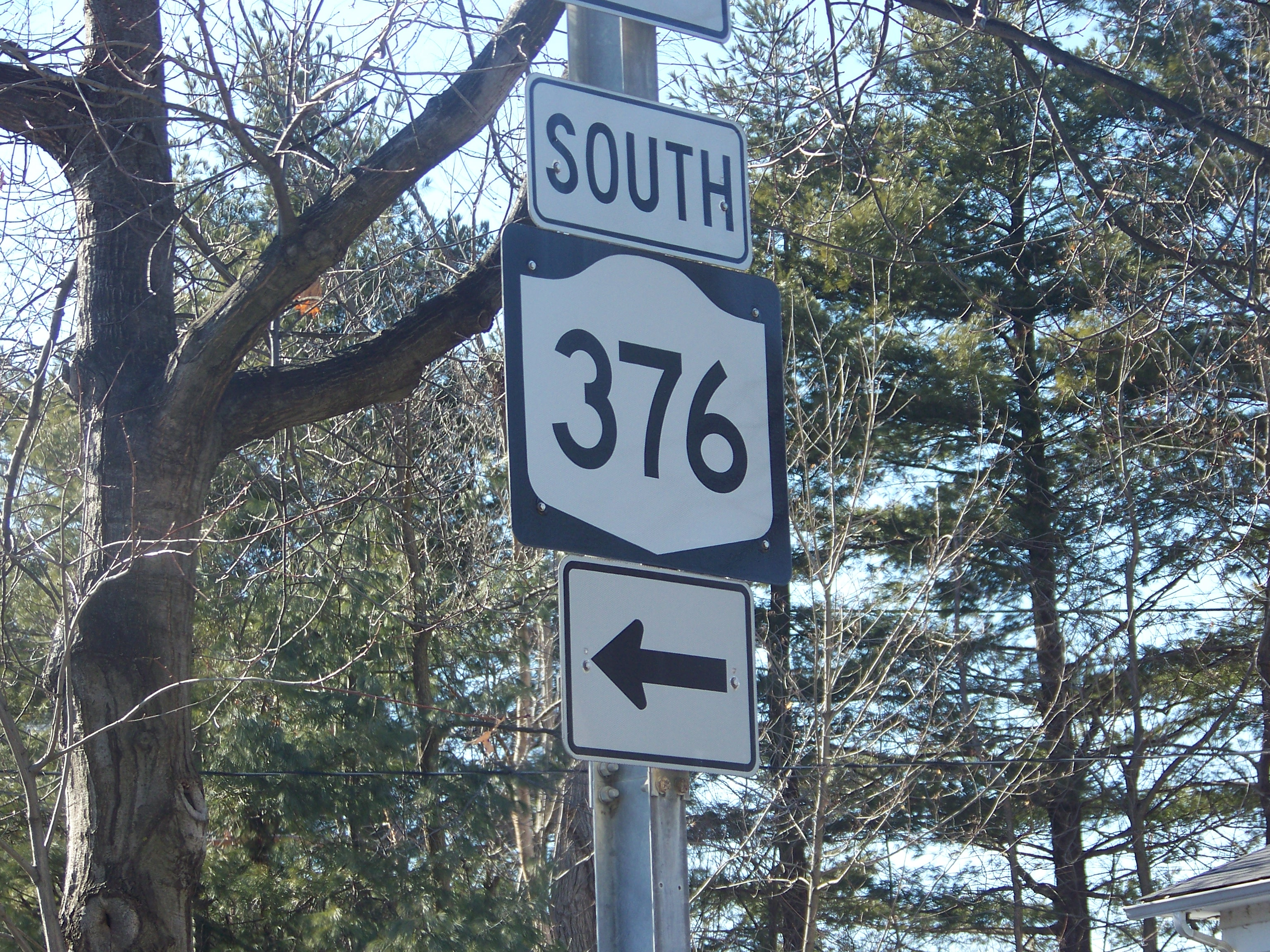
Signage for NY 376 near the route's southern terminus

NY 376 was originally designated as part of NY 39, a route extending from Patterson to Poughkeepsie by way of West Patterson and East Fishkill, in the mid-1920s. In the 1930 renumbering of state highways in New York, NY 39 was reassigned to another highway in western New York while its former routing in the Hudson Valley was broken up into several routes. One of these was NY 202, a new route that began in East Fishkill and ended in Poughkeepsie. The rest of NY 39 became part of NY 52 from East Fishkill to the western fringe of Patterson, and NY 311 for the rest of the routing. In 1934, US 202 was designated by AASHO. US 202 signs did not get put up in New York until April 1, 1935. In order to avoid a numbering conflict, NY 202 was renumbered to NY 376 that day.

=== Roundabouts ===
In 2006, the New York State Department of Transportation (NYSDOT) converted NY 376's intersections with the main gate of Vassar College and College Avenue into roundabouts. Both of the roundabouts replaced traffic lights. A traffic signal used to control traffic for a pedestrian crosswalk was also removed as part of their construction. Another roundabout was constructed in 2008 at Fulton and Collegeview Avenues. NYSDOT has called the installation of roundabouts a success, stating that it has significantly calmed traffic, decreased congestion and increased traffic flow.

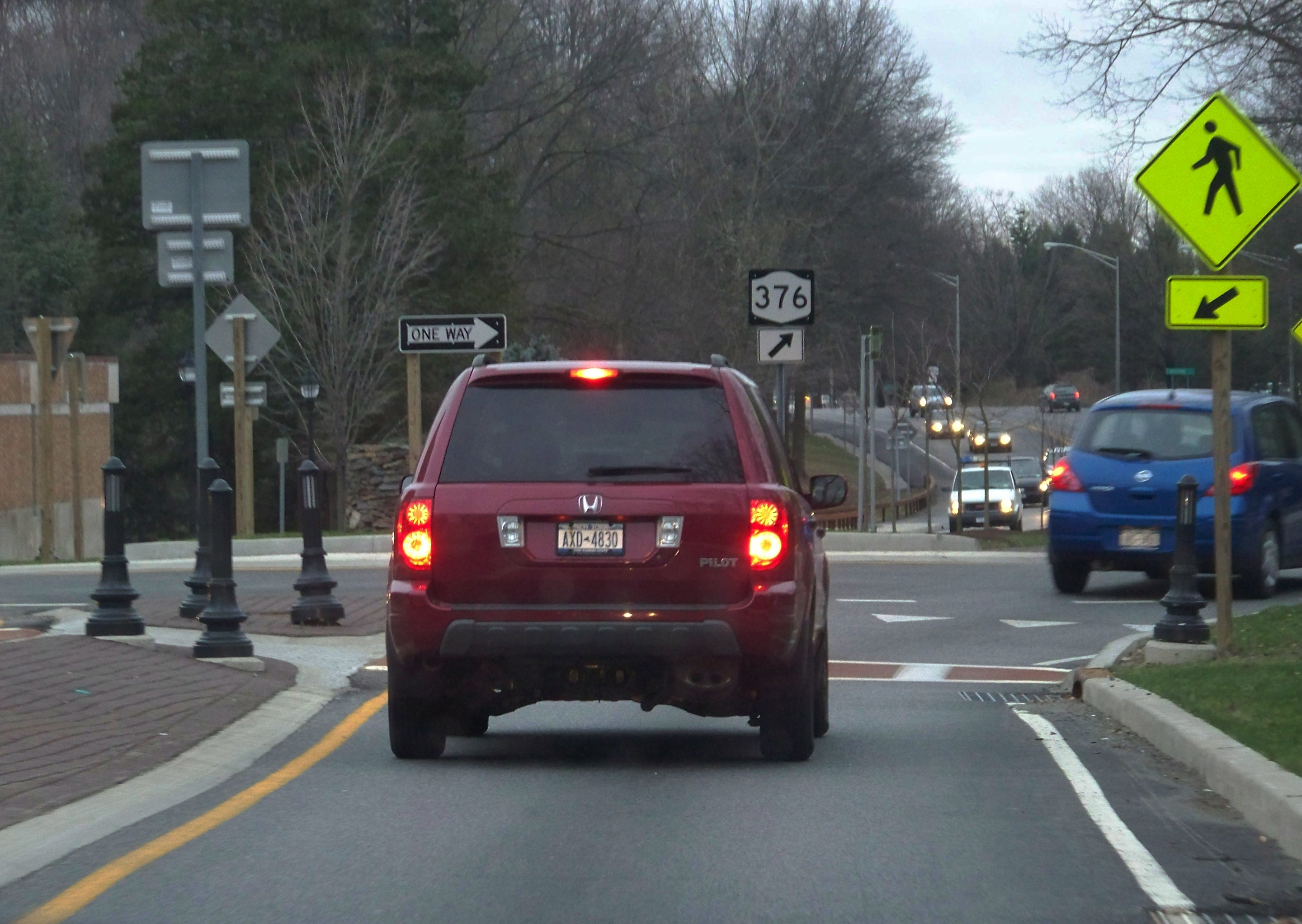
Roundabouts on NY 376 in front of Vassar College

The construction of the roundabouts was controversial from the outset. The first two roundabouts were installed by NYSDOT even though both the town and city of Poughkeepsie declared that they were opposed to the roundabouts. Additionally, the roundabouts have drawn much controversy from local residents because they remove a lane of traffic in each direction, reducing Raymond Avenue (NY 376) from a four-lane road to a divided two-lane boulevard and significantly altering pre-existing traffic patterns. A moderate amount of traffic has diverted onto alternate local routes as a result. In response, NYSDOT installed traffic calming measures on these parallel roads prior to the construction of the Fulton Avenue roundabout.

== Major intersections ==
The entire route is in Dutchess County.

Location	mi	km	Destinations	Notes
Town of East Fishkill	0.00	0.00	NY 52 – Carmel, Fishkill	Southern terminus; hamlet of East Fishkill
Town of East Fishkill	2.14	3.44	NY 82 south	Southern end of NY 82 concurrency; hamlet of Hopewell Junction
Town of East Fishkill	2.23	3.59	NY 82 north	Northern end of NY 82 concurrency; hamlet of Hopewell Junction
Town of Poughkeepsie	10.31	16.59	NY 113 west (Spackenkill Road) / CR 77 south (Vassar Road)	Eastern terminus of NY 113; northern terminus of CR 77; hamlet of Red Oaks Mill
Town of Poughkeepsie	12.63	20.33	Hooker Avenue (NY 983T west)	
Town of Poughkeepsie	13.60	21.89	US 44 east / NY 55 east	Hamlet of Arlington
Town of Poughkeepsie	13.87	22.32	US 44 west / NY 55 west	Northern terminus; hamlet of Arlington
1.000 mi = 1.609 km; 1.000 km = 0.621 mi: Concurrency terminus
