= Red Oaks Mill, New York =

Census-designated place in New York, United States

- Census-designated place
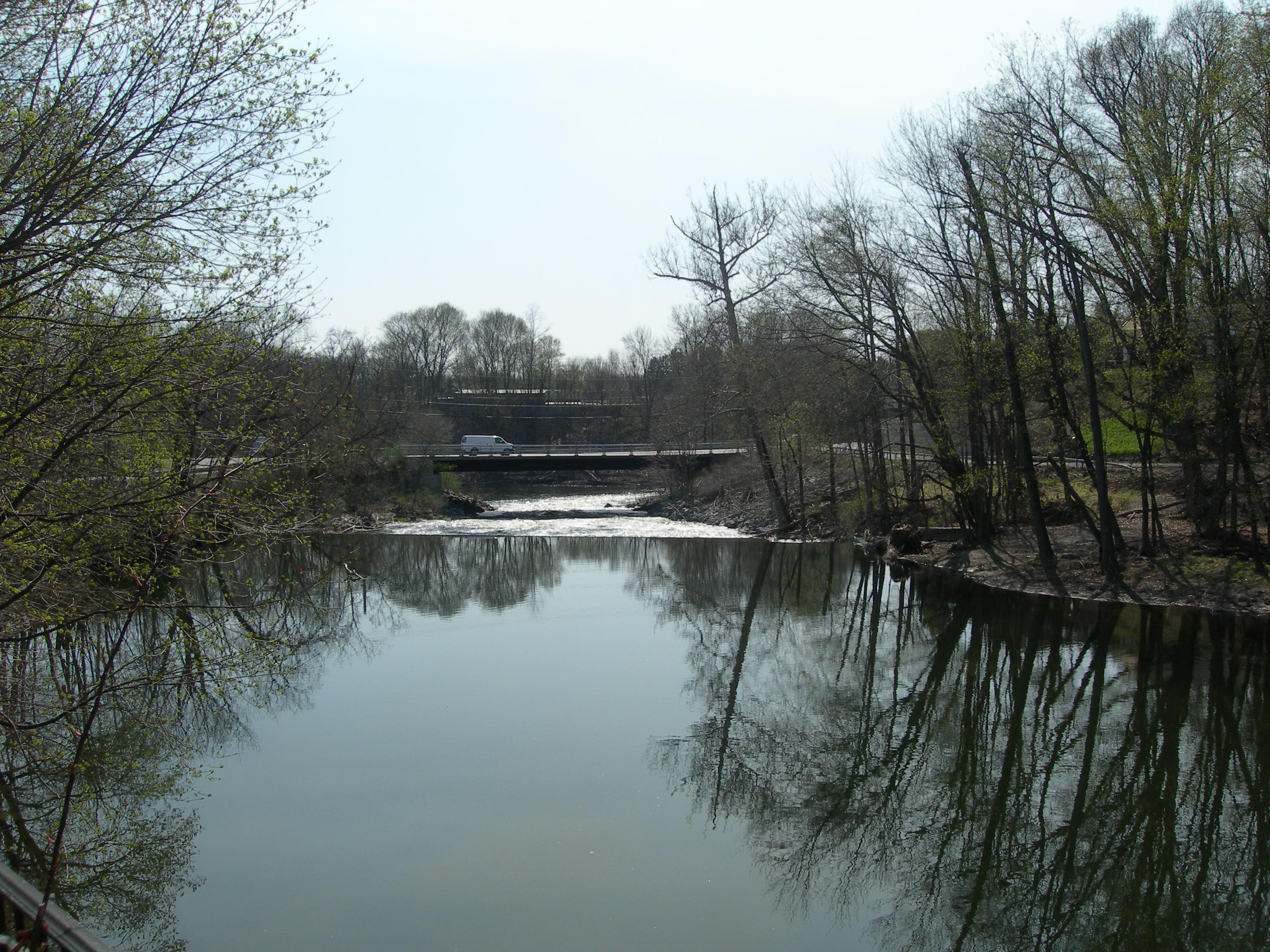
- Falls on Wappinger Creek at Red Oaks Mill

- Location of Red Oaks Mill, New York
- Coordinates: 41°39′5″N 73°52′22″W
- Country: United States
- State: New York
- County: Dutchess
- Towns: LaGrange, Poughkeepsie

Area
  - Total: 2.44 sq mi (6.31 km^{2})
  - Land: 2.41 sq mi (6.23 km^{2})
  - Water: 0.031 sq mi (0.08 km^{2})
- Elevation: 167 ft (51 m)

Population (2020)
  - Total: 3,810
  - Density: 1,583.9/sq mi (611.56/km^{2})
- Time zone: UTC-5 (Eastern (EST))
  - Summer (DST): UTC-4 (EDT)
- ZIP Code: 12603 (Poughkeepsie)
- FIPS code: 36-60983
- GNIS feature ID: 0962312

Red Oaks Mill is a hamlet and census-designated place (CDP) in Dutchess County, in the U.S. state of New York. It lies within the limits of the towns of Poughkeepsie and LaGrange. As of the 2020 census, Red Oaks Mill had a population of 3,810.

Red Oaks Mill is southeast of the city of Poughkeepsie and can be considered a suburb of the city. It is part of the Kiryas Joel-Poughkeepsie–Newburgh, New York Metropolitan Statistical Area as well as the larger New York–Newark–Bridgeport, New York-New Jersey-Connecticut-Pennsylvania Combined Statistical Area.

== Geography ==
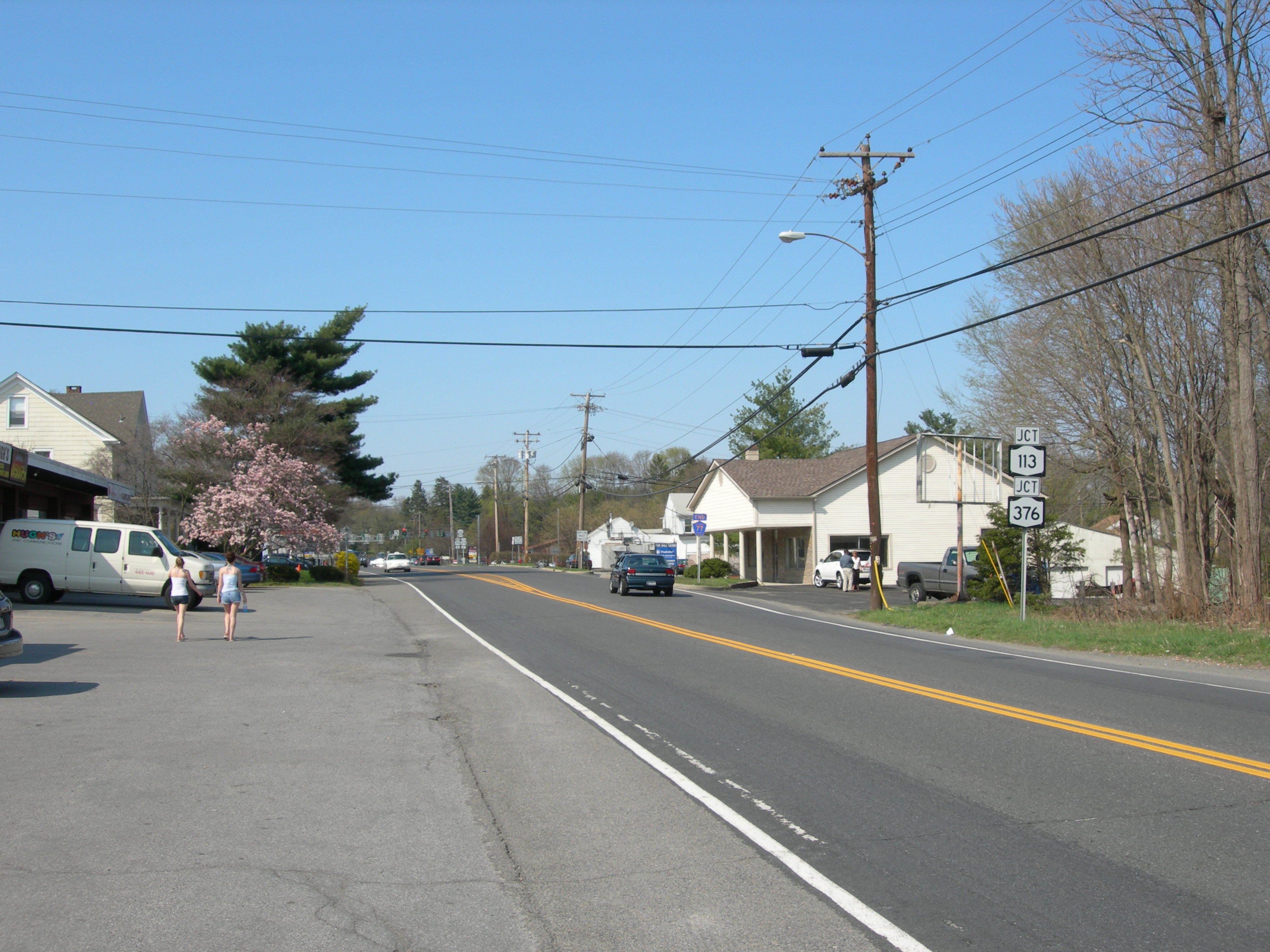
Vassar Road at Red Oaks Mill

Red Oaks Mill is located at 41°39′05″N 73°52′22″W. Wappinger Creek, a tributary of the Hudson River, flows through the center of the community, forming the border between the towns of Poughkeepsie and LaGrange.

At the center of Red Oaks Mill is a complex intersection where Vassar Road (Dutchess County Route 77), New Hackensack Road (New York State Route 376), Spackenkill Road (New York State Route 113), and a small residential side road all meet. Several shopping plazas, strip malls, and other commercial properties are found at or near this intersection.

According to the United States Census Bureau, the CDP has a total area of 2.3 square miles (6.0 km^{2}), of which 0.031 square miles (0.08 km^{2}), or 1.32%, is water.

== Demographics ==
Historical population
Census	Pop.	Note	%±
2000	4,930		—
2010	3,613		−26.7%
2020	3,810		5.5%
U.S. Decennial Census

=== 2020 census ===
As of the 2020 census, Red Oaks Mill had a population of 3,810. The median age was 43.6 years. 20.0% of residents were under the age of 18 and 18.8% of residents were 65 years of age or older. For every 100 females there were 101.6 males, and for every 100 females age 18 and over there were 99.3 males age 18 and over.

100.0% of residents lived in urban areas, while 0.0% lived in rural areas.

There were 1,358 households in Red Oaks Mill, of which 32.6% had children under the age of 18 living in them. Of all households, 63.9% were married-couple households, 13.8% were households with a male householder and no spouse or partner present, and 18.6% were households with a female householder and no spouse or partner present. About 19.5% of all households were made up of individuals and 9.8% had someone living alone who was 65 years of age or older.

There were 1,413 housing units, of which 3.9% were vacant. The homeowner vacancy rate was 1.6% and the rental vacancy rate was 3.7%.

Racial composition as of the 2020 census
Race	Number	Percent
White	2,819	74.0%
Black or African American	300	7.9%
American Indian and Alaska Native	10	0.3%
Asian	155	4.1%
Native Hawaiian and Other Pacific Islander	1	0.0%
Some other race	164	4.3%
Two or more races	361	9.5%
Hispanic or Latino (of any race)	466	12.2%

=== 2000 census ===
As of the 2000 census, there were 4,930 people, 1,724 households, and 1,411 families residing in the hamlet. The population density was 1,401.5 inhabitants per square mile (541.1/km^{2}). There were 1,767 housing units at an average density of 502.3 per square mile (193.9/km^{2}). The racial makeup of the hamlet was 89.74% White, 4.67% African American, 0.14% Native American, 2.80% Asian, 1.50% from other races, and 1.16% from two or more races. Hispanic or Latino of any race were 5.05% of the population.

There were 1,724 households, out of which 36.9% had children under the age of 18 living with them, 71.1% were married couples living together, 7.5% had a female householder with no husband present, and 18.1% were non-families. Fifteen-point-four percent of all households were made up of individuals, and 6.8% had someone living alone who was 65 years of age or older. The average household size was 2.85 and the average family size was 3.17.

In the CDP, the population was spread out, with 26.8% under the age of 18, 5.9% from 18 to 24, 27.9% from 25 to 44, 25.5% from 45 to 64, and 13.9% who were 65 years of age or older. The median age was 39 years. For every 100 females, there were 95.4 males. For every 100 females age 18 and over, there were 93.5 males.

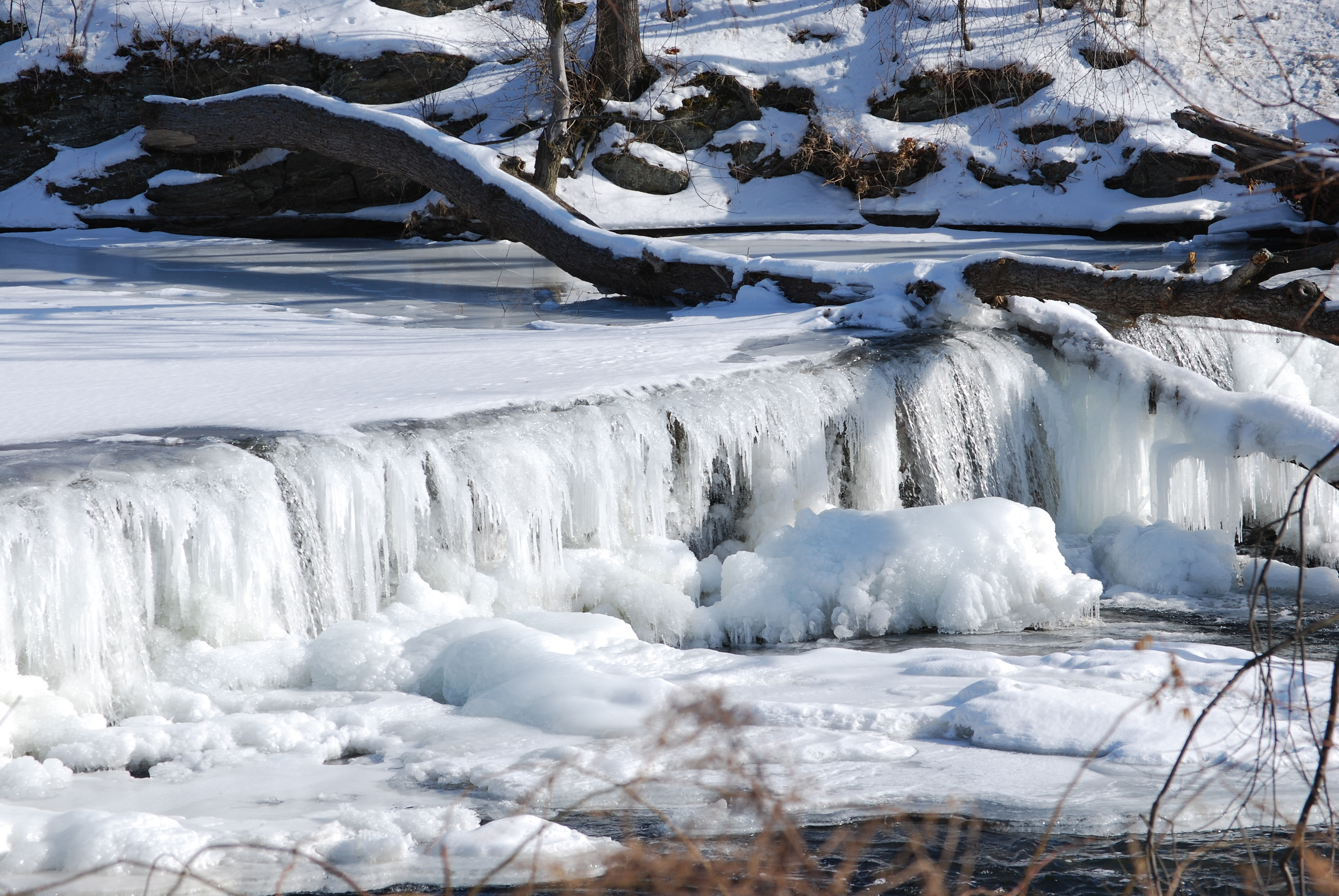
Frozen falls at Red Oaks Mill

The median income for a household in the CDP was $77,533, and the median income for a family was $80,628. Males had a median income of $59,083 versus $27,697 for females. The per capita income for the CDP was $28,713. About 1.3% of families and 2.8% of the population were below the poverty line, including 5.5% of those under age 18 and 0.9% of those age 65 or over.

== Education ==
Portions are in the Arlington Central School District while other parts are in the Wappingers Central School District.

The Arlington district operates Arlington High School.
