= Stone Street Historic District (New Hamburg, New York) =

Historic district in New York, United States

- U.S. National Register of Historic Places
- U.S. Historic district
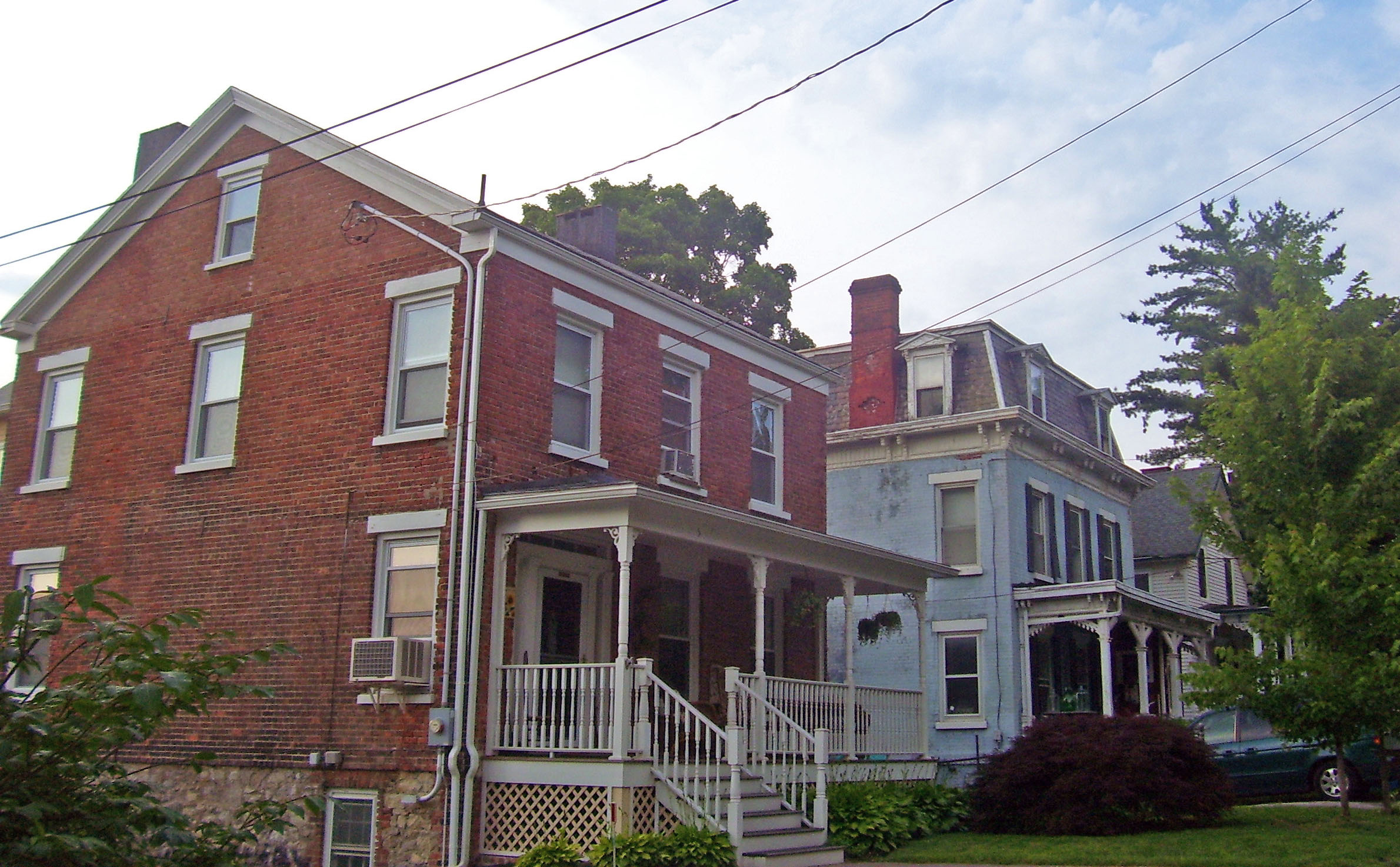
- 5,7 and 9 Stone Street, 2008
- Location: New Hamburg, NY
- Nearest city: Poughkeepsie
- Coordinates: 41°35′17″N 73°56′53″W
- Area: 1 acre (0.40 ha)
- Built: mid-19th century
- Architectural style: Greek Revival, Second Empire
- MPS: New Hamburg MRA
- NRHP reference No.: 87000120
- Added to NRHP: 1987

The Stone Street Historic District is a one-block section of the west side of that street in the hamlet of New Hamburg, New York, United States. It was recognized as a historic district and added to the National Register of Historic Places in 1987 as the largest group of intact houses in the hamlet.

An acre in area, it includes four houses built in the middle of the 19th century in vernacular styles ranging from Greek Revival to the only Second Empire house in the hamlet, reflecting architectural tastes of that time. Located atop a small rise with views to the Hudson River from the rear, they were in their time the premier residential area of their small community. The houses opposite them were demolished in a railroad expansion, but the remaining homes have been altered very little.

== Buildings ==
The district includes all four homes on the lots on Stone between Bridge Street on the south and Division Street on the north. The house at 18 Division is also included. All are contributing properties. There are two outbuildings, one of which is also considered contributing.

- 5 Stone Street. A two-story, three-bay brick home on a raised brick-and-stone foundation built circa 1858. Front doorway behind full-length porch has original paneled door with side and transom lights divided by pilasters.
- 7 Stone Street. A Second Empire home of similar composition, size and fenestration built in 1870. It has a mansard roof with slate tile and pedimented dormer windows. Has a small, contributing barn with tin roof in rear.
- 9 Stone Street. One-and-a-half-story frame house on raised basement with L-shaped gabled roof in diamond-patterned slate, built ca. 1870. Three-bay front porch has bracketed cornice.
- 18 Division Street. Five-bay two-story clapboard house originally built in 1845 and heavily renovated in 1870. Bracketed cornice on all elevations; windows have architraves with straight corbeled heads.

== History ==
The Stone Street lots were originally the property of Samuel and Maria Ellis, who bought them all in 1841 and built the original home at 18 Division Street. After Samuel Ellis died in 1857, Maria and her children began selling off the other lots. The recent construction of the nearby Hudson River Railroad had made Stone Street a prime residential property location, atop a low rise a short walk from downtown.

Marvin Van Anders, owner of the New Hamburg Hotel on Point Street, built 5 Stone Street for himself later that year. The lot next door went through several owners until Peter and Rachel Leroy bought it and built the house where they would live for the next 20 years. Finally, 9 Stone was sold in 1870 to William Bogardus, baggage master for the railroad. The original house at 18 Division Street was heavily renovated that year as well.

Around 1900 the neighborhood changed significantly when the New York Central, which now owned the tracks, decided to convert the tunnel originally built north of the New Hamburg station to an open cut. In order to do this, it acquired the homes on the east side of the street and demolished them, opening up the space in front of the homes on the west. The neighborhood changed again in 1928, when the railroad decided to expand the main line to four tracks and closed off the Main Street grade crossing. It was replaced by the new Bridge Street, which intersected Stone just south of today's district, making it a little more accessible to the center of the small community.

Since then some of the houses have been converted into apartments, as New Hamburg's days as a commercial shipping center have long ended, and the New York Central has given way to Metro-North's commuter service. Stone Street has remained largely intact.

== Aesthetics ==
5 and 7 Stone Street present an interesting contrast in styles. The Greek Revival forms of the former are extremely conservative for their time, suggesting an almost deliberate choice of a mode that had largely fallen out of favor by then, even in smaller towns. The Second Empire stylings of its neighbor are, by contrast, an early use for such a small town. It is possible that Leroy, a riverboat captain, had greater exposure to contemporary architectural trends through his work and visits to other Hudson Valley communities and reflected that in the way he chose to build his house.

A unifying touch to all four houses is the Hudson River Bracketed porches. This reflects awareness of architecture outside the vicinity of New Hamburg. In the past #5 and # 7 had the same roof but a fire at #5 forced them to rebuild the roof in a more conventional style.
