= New Hamburg station =

Metro-North Railroad station in New York

New Hamburg
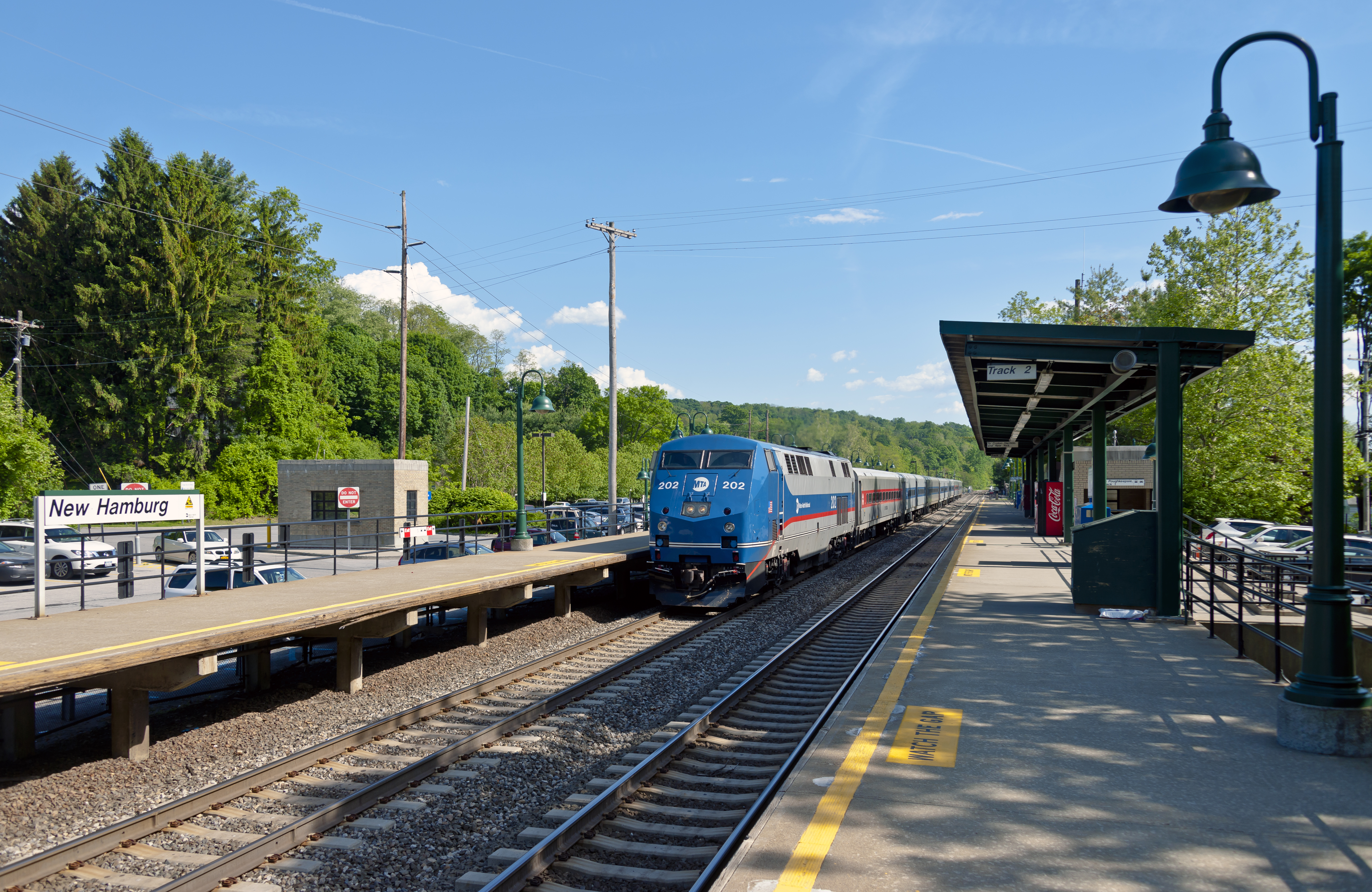
- Poughkeepsie-bound Metro North train arriving at the New Hamburg station

General information
- Location: Main Street & County Route 28, New Hamburg, New York
- Coordinates: 41.5889°N 73.9479°W
- Owner: Metro-North Railroad
- Line: Hudson Line
- Platforms: 2 side platforms
- Tracks: 2
- Connections: Dutchess County Public Transit: New Hamburg RailLink

Construction
- Accessible: yes

Other information
- Fare zone: 8

History
- Opened: December 6, 1849
- Closed: July 2, 1973
- Rebuilt: October 17, 1981

Passengers
- 2018: 1,060 (Metro-North)
- Rank: 55 of 109 (Metro-North)

Services
Preceding station	Metro-North Railroad	Following station
Poughkeepsie Terminus	Hudson Line	Beacon toward Grand Central

Former services
Preceding station	New York Central Railroad	Following station
Camelot toward Chicago	Main Line	Chelsea toward New York
Location

New Hamburg station is a commuter rail stop on the Metro-North Railroad's Hudson Line, serving Wappingers Falls, New York.

== History ==
The Hudson River Railroad was built through New Hamburg in 1849, opening on December 6, in order to expand the Troy and Greenbush Railroad from the Albany area to New York City. Earlier attempts to build the railroad in 1848 were delayed by a fatal cholera outbreak among railroad workers between 1848 and 1849. The HRR was acquired by the New York Central Railroad in 1864.

The New Hamburg station bisects the hamlet's Main Street. Old photographs show a grade crossing used to exist here; since the line was double-tracked in 1928, however, getting from one end of Main Street to the other has required a detour via nearby Bridge Street. Another bridge further north on Reed Road is the only other crossing in the hamlet.

=== Closing and reopening ===
New Hamburg is notable as one of the few in the Metro-North system to have closed and reopened. In April 1973, the Penn Central Railroad (PC) announced planned to close flag stops, including New Hamburg, Oscawanna, Manitou and Chelsea stations on the Hudson Line and Morrisania on the Harlem Line due to low ridership. The stops were initially supposed to be closed on April 29, but the date was pushed back to May 9 due to a 90-day freeze imposed by Congress on the status of railroad crews. This change was opposed by a group of New Hamburg commuters led by Frank Lucas, who attested that the station's usage was 15 to 20 daily passengers, not the 2 indicated by PC figures. The PC spokesman said that commuters from Poughkeepsie often complained about the frequency of stops on the line. Lucas stated that flag stops often took less than 30 seconds, which should not be considered an inconvenience.

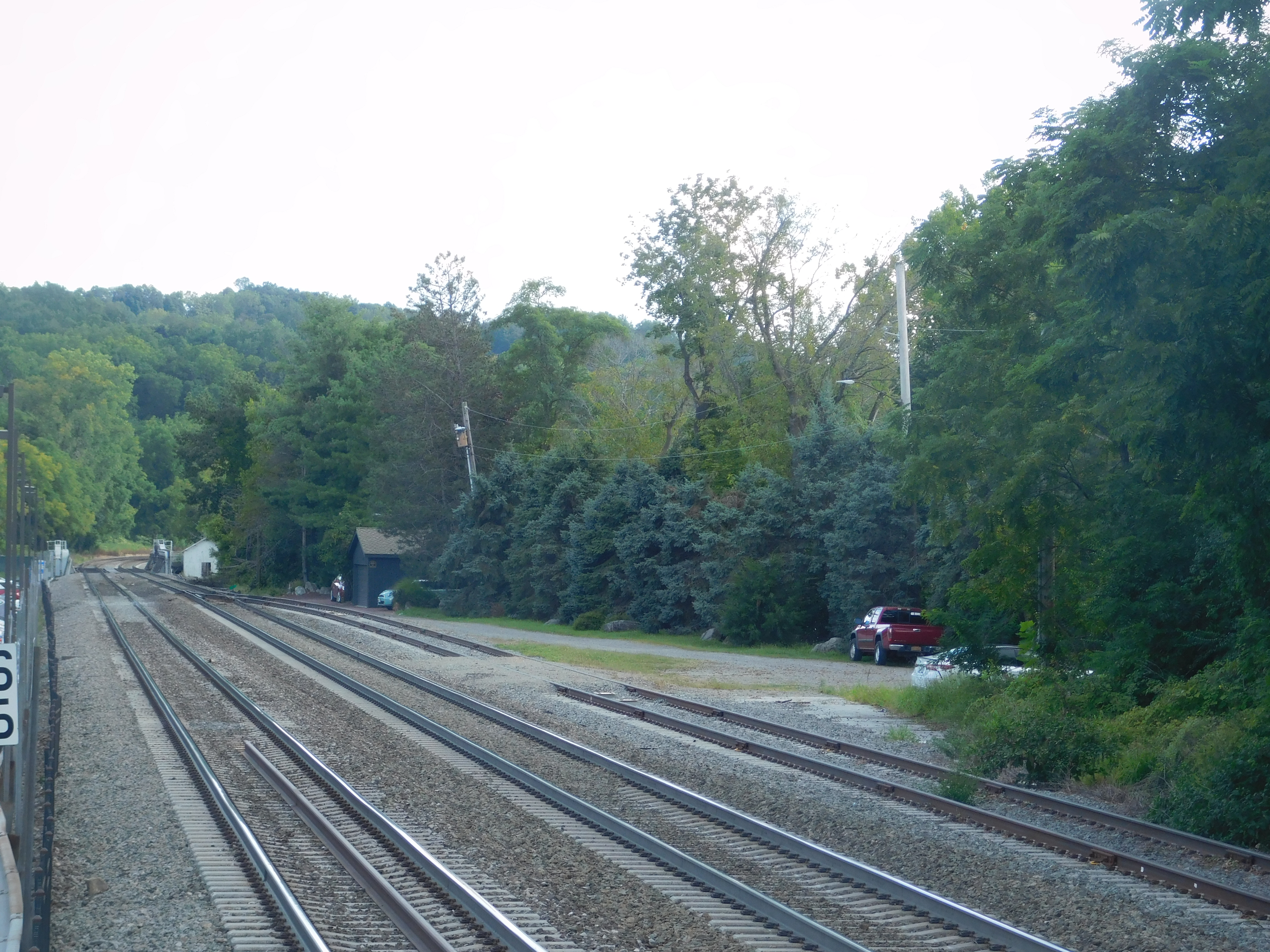
The site of the former New York Central Railroad station in New Hamburg

On June 7, 1973, the Penn Central Railroad announced that the station would close along with the Oscawanna, Manitou and Chelsea stations on the Hudson Line due to low ridership on July 2, 1973. This announcement strongly disturbed two state legislators from Dutchess County, who stated that the MTA had indicated that no decision had been reached in a letter from the previous month, due to the inconvenience its closure would result in, and because of the short notice of the announcement. The original New Hamburg station was closed by the Penn Central Railroad on July 2, 1973.

After the station's closure, local residents pressed for its reopening. On February 26, 1980, the MTA held a meeting to discuss the cost of reopening the station. The MTA estimate that it could cost $180,000 to $200,000. Its proposal entailed the installation of new platforms, lighting, and parking for 100 cars, and the construction of a pedestrian overpass to replace the tunnel, which was boarded up due to flooding. County Legislator Joseph Poillucci said that he would only be willing to sponsor the project if it could be cut to less than $100,000. After the meeting, Lois Sackelos created the New Hamburg Station Citizen's Committee to determine the minimum investment needed to get the station into acceptable use and how to finance it. The committee revealed its plan on March 6, 1980, which reduced the cost to $50,000. It proposed eliminating the shelter for passengers, reducing the amount of lighting being called for, using the existing passenger tunnel with the installation of pumps, and the paving over of the existing platform instead of building a new one. The MTA assured Sackelos that trains could start stopping immediately if funding was provided and if the MTA approved of the plan.

The MTA cut the cost estimate for the station in March 1980 from $180,000 to $65,000 for a scaled down plan, accepting the basic concept of the committee's plan. It estimated the cost of the parking to be $15,000. The original plan had included a complete renovation, including a $100,000 overpass replacing the tunnel under the tracks. Sackelos' group estimate that the project would cost $50,000. The cost discrepancy had to do with the construction of a new platform. The MTA called for the construction of a four-car platform for $25,000, while the group's proposal called for the construction of a three-car long platform for $9,000 to $10,000.

In April 1980, the MTA agreed to pay for the remainder of the station work if the County provided $15,000 for the parking lot. In April 1980, the Dutchess County Legislature appropriated $3,000 to reopen the station, with an additional $15,000 to pave the parking lot, provide lighting and repair the tunnel under the tracks. However, in August, the MTA asked for $15,000 to maintain the area. That month, County Legislator Joseph Poillucci requested that the station be reopened after receiving a petition signed by 800 people from the Sackelos' citizens group. Poillucci expected 200 daily passengers for the station who drive to Poughkeepsie or Beacon to catch the train.

In April 1981, the Dutchess County Legislature held a vote on the contract between the MTA and Dutchess County to reopen the station. It had taken a year to negotiate the contract, which requires that the county pay $15,000 to repair the stop prior to its reopening. The yearly charge for the station was estimated to be $14,500. The station reopened on October 17, 1981, after the MTA took over the line after efforts led by New Hamburg resident Lois Sackelos, and County Legislator Joseph Poillucci. The station was renovated and the platforms were lengthened. The reopening of the station was appreciated by commuters, but not with all local residents, who believed that it was hurting the town's character as noise, traffic and litter increased. In 1982, the station recorded 166 morning rush hour commuters. Ridership during this period increased to 207 in 1985, 354 in 1987 and 401 in 1989, following a drastic increase in ridership on the Upper Hudson Line. On July 12, 1988, Metro-North announced plans to build 80 new parking spaces around the station for $140,000 so the lot could accommodate 360 cars. At the time, the station was the second fastest-growing station on Metro-North behind Brewster North with 120% growth since 1982. In the early 1990s, the platforms were replaced by high-level platforms for $2.5 million. The parking lot was increased by 70 spots for $300,000 in 1991. On January 19, 1993, Dutchess County's new LOOP bus service began stopping at New Hamburg to connect with five morning trains and six evening trains in order to ease station parking.

On March 22, 1994, Metro-North agreed to add more parking at the station after local officials threatened to delay $954 in railroad improvements. 130 more passengers used the station than there were parking spots, on average. Metro-North had been planning to spend $1.1 million to improve parking in 1998. On April 27, 1994, the Poughkeepsie Town Board passed a law prohibiting parking in New Hamburg Park as commuters had started parking there due to a parking shortage. Earlier that month, Metro-North agreed to add 250 spaces. By June 40 spaces were to be added to the 452-space lot by repainting the lot, and additional 40 were to be added by December. The number of spaces later went up to 585, and in 1996, Metro-North leased land for 85 more spaces.

On March 12, 2003, a 1000-pound door blew off of a CSX freight train and destroyed the station shelter. The repairs were estimated to cost $400,000. In January 2004, months after it was supposed to be installed, Metro-North added a temporary shelter.

== Station layout ==
The station has two high-level side platforms each six cars long.
