= Main Street Historic District (New Hamburg, New York) =

Historic district in New York, United States

- U.S. National Register of Historic Places
- U.S. Historic district
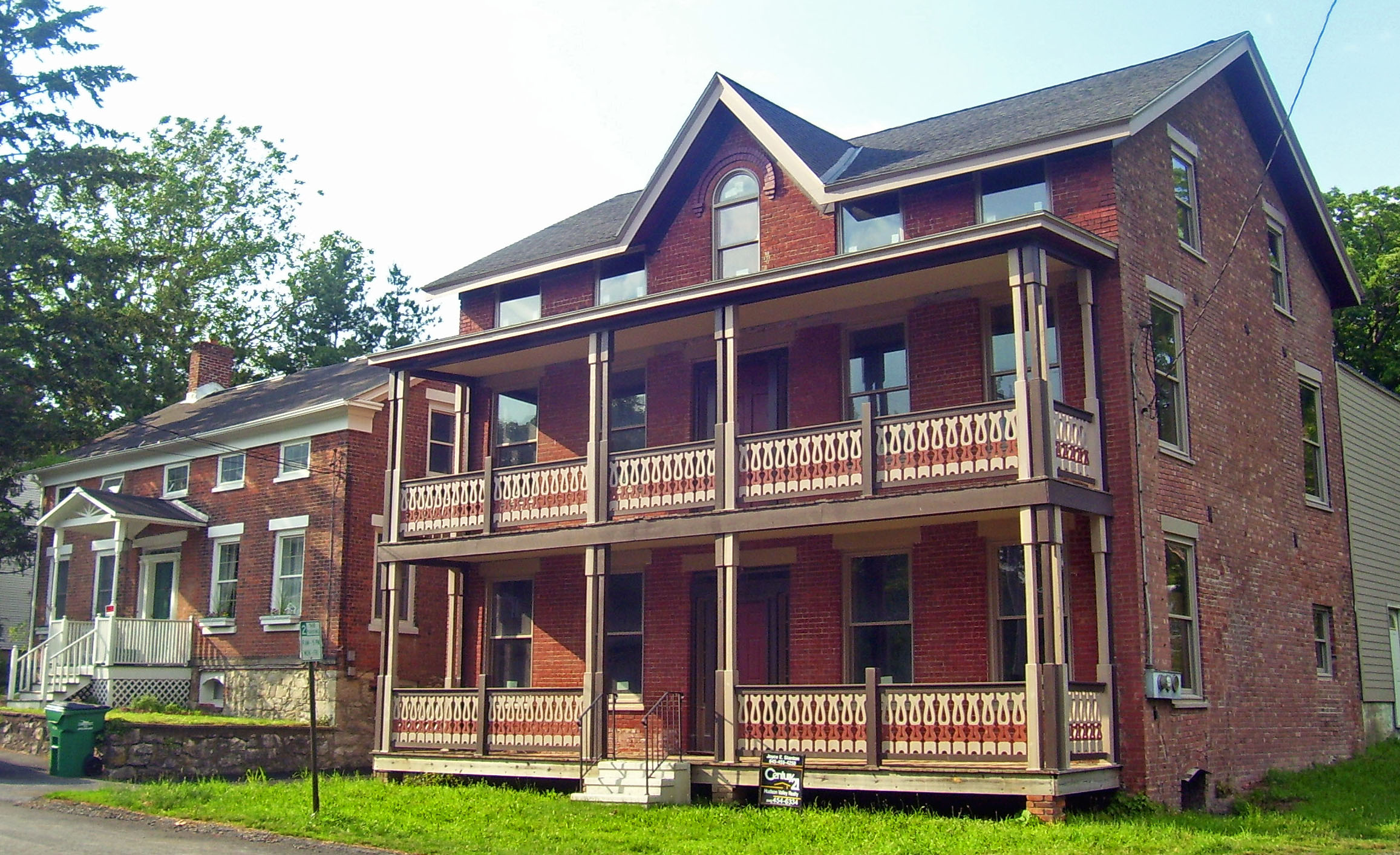
- Houses at 13 and 15 Main Street, 2008

- Location within New York Location within the United States
- Location: Main St. roughly bounded by Stone and Bridge Sts., New Hamburg, NY
- Nearest city: Poughkeepsie
- Coordinates: 41°35′14″N 73°56′54″W
- Area: 1 acre (4,000 m²)
- Built: c. 1845-1876
- MPS: New Hamburg MRA
- NRHP reference No.: 87000122
- Added to NRHP: February 27, 1987

The Main Street Historic District in New Hamburg, New York, United States is located along that street just west of the train station. Six buildings on a single acre (4,000 m²) are an intact remnant of the hamlet as it was developed in the middle of the 19th century, prior to the Hudson River Railroad's construction, which cut it in half.

Its contributing buildings, three houses and three commercial buildings, are made of brick and representative of vernacular applications of the then-popular Greek Revival and Gothic Revival styles. The neighborhood was recognized as a historic district and added to the National Register of Historic Places in 1987. It is the smallest in area of the 62 Main Street Historic Districts on the Register.

== Buildings ==
The district includes all the lots along the north side of Main between Railroad and Bridge streets. On the south side, a former church building converted into apartments at 12 Main Street is not included due to those modifications. All buildings save one on the remaining lots between Main and Bridge are considered contributing properties.

- 9A Main Street. A 2-story five-bay frame residence built by John Lawson c. 1845 on a brick and stone foundation. It has been subsequently modified with a hipped-roof porch with Tuscan columns and a spindle-turned balustrade.
- 10 Main Street. A 2-story commercial clapboard commercial/residential structure built c. 1876.
- 11 Main Street. A 1 1/2-story three-bay frame house on raised brick foundation built c. 1850. Low-pitched saltbox roofline is accentuated by eyebrow windows around cornice.
- 12 Main Street. A 1 1/2-story five-bay brick residence on stone foundation, built in 1875 as the New Hamburg post office. Projecting roof has paired brackets and spiked finials at corners.
- 13 Main Street. A 1 1/2-story five-bay brick house on stone foundation built in two sections c. 1855 by Conklin Bishop. Eyebrow windows on south (front) elevation under corniced roof. Decorative porch added later. A more recent garage with gambrel roof is the district's only non-contributing resource.
- 15 Main Street. Built c. 1855 as the Central House Hotel, it is the largest and most elaborate building in the district, a five-bay 2 1/2-story brick structure with tin gabled roof and two end chimneys. The front facade has a full-length, two-tier verandah with chamfered, bracketed posts and decorative jigsaw cutout on the balustrades. The lower floor was used as a tavern while guests slept above.

== History ==
New Hamburg began as a port community on the river, with ships loaded and unloaded along nearby Point Street and then taken to Poughkeepsie and Wappingers Falls via road. By the 1840s, most of the Point Street lots had been taken and newer residents were turning to Main Street, a few blocks inland. The house at 9A Main Street, built by John Lawson, a descendant of the area's first European settlers, is the earliest known to have been built in the current district.

In 1848 construction began on the Hudson River Railroad. An 800-foot (240 m) tunnel was built through a hillside north of town, and the work being done there triggered the development of Main Street as a commercial area. This continued after the tunnel was completed, since a passenger station and freight facilities were built for transshipment purposes. An 1858 map of the area shows four of the six houses already complete, and by 1876 another map shows all of them.

The railroad that had nurtured Main Street eventually caused its decline. In 1928, now part of the New York Central, the line was expanded from one track to two, and in the process Main Street's grade crossing was eliminated in favor of a new overpass called Bridge Street, one block to the north. Traffic to what little commercial activity remained at the riverfront simply followed the new street straight to it, turning Main into a short side street that remained important to the community only as the location of its general store.

After the Second World War, the railroad would itself decline, taking commercial activity along Main and in New Hamburg with it. The station was eventually closed, but later reopened as a commuter rail station by Metro-North Railroad, which eventually succeeded the New York Central (later the Penn Central and then Conrail) as the regional passenger operator on the line. Most of the buildings along Main were converted to primarily residential use.

== Aesthetics ==
The mid-century houses show the influence of the Greek Revival style still popular at the time of their construction. Their form is rectilinear; their interiors follow that style's central-hall format. The eyebrow windows are a further touch common to such buildings.

Later buildings show the rise of the Gothic Revival movement. The Central House's steeply pitched front cross-gable is the most notable application, showing the sophistication of the Picturesque mode. It may have influenced the later additions in that style to some of the other buildings, most notably the Lawson House.
