= Crown Heights, New York =

- Census-designated place
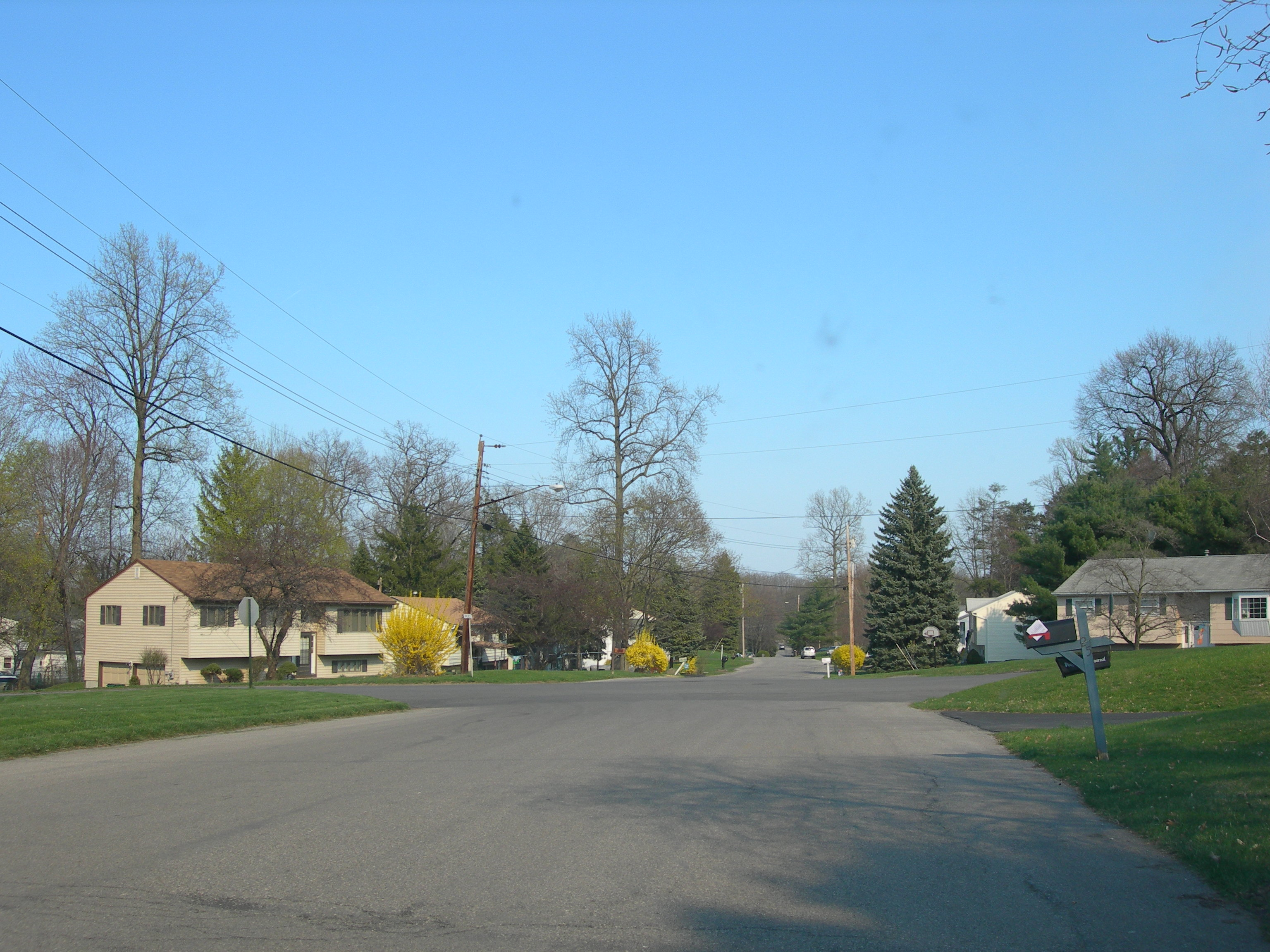
- Residential road in Crown Heights

- Location of Crown Heights, New York
- Coordinates: 41°38′32″N 73°55′46″W
- Country: United States
- State: New York
- County: Dutchess
- Town: Poughkeepsie

Area
  - Total: 0.85 sq mi (2.19 km^{2})
  - Land: 0.85 sq mi (2.19 km^{2})
  - Water: 0 sq mi (0.00 km^{2})
- Elevation: 155 ft (47 m)

Population (2020)
  - Total: 2,872
  - Density: 3,402.8/sq mi (1,313.81/km^{2})
- Time zone: UTC-5 (Eastern (EST))
  - Summer (DST): UTC-4 (EDT)
- ZIP Code: 12601 (Poughkeepsie)
- FIPS code: 36-19229
- GNIS feature ID: 1867397

Crown Heights is a hamlet and census-designated place (CDP) in Dutchess County, New York, United States. As of the 2020 census, Crown Heights had a population of 2,872. It is part of the Kiryas Joel–Poughkeepsie–Newburgh, NY Metropolitan Statistical Area as well as the larger New York–Newark–Bridgeport, NY-NJ-CT-PA Combined Statistical Area.

Crown Heights is in the town of Poughkeepsie.

== Geography ==
Crown Heights is located at 41°38′24″N 73°55′55″W (41.639978, -73.931929), in the south-central part of the town of Poughkeepsie. U.S. Route 9 forms the eastern edge of the CDP and leads north 4 miles (6 km) to downtown Poughkeepsie and south 4 miles (6 km) to Wappingers Falls.

According to the United States Census Bureau, the CDP has a total area of 0.85 square miles (2.2 km^{2}), all land.

== Demographics ==
Historical population
Census	Pop.	Note	%±
2000	2,992		—
2010	2,840		−5.1%
2020	2,872		1.1%
U.S. Decennial Census

=== 2020 census ===
As of the 2020 census, Crown Heights had a population of 2,872. The median age was 40.8 years. 22.1% of residents were under the age of 18 and 16.5% of residents were 65 years of age or older. For every 100 females there were 95.6 males, and for every 100 females age 18 and over there were 89.9 males age 18 and over.

100.0% of residents lived in urban areas, while 0.0% lived in rural areas.

There were 1,026 households in Crown Heights, of which 36.0% had children under the age of 18 living in them. Of all households, 55.3% were married-couple households, 13.5% were households with a male householder and no spouse or partner present, and 25.5% were households with a female householder and no spouse or partner present. About 21.1% of all households were made up of individuals and 11.3% had someone living alone who was 65 years of age or older.

There were 1,068 housing units, of which 3.9% were vacant. The homeowner vacancy rate was 0.8% and the rental vacancy rate was 5.0%.

Racial composition as of the 2020 census
Race	Number	Percent
White	1,902	66.2%
Black or African American	319	11.1%
American Indian and Alaska Native	6	0.2%
Asian	179	6.2%
Native Hawaiian and Other Pacific Islander	1	0.0%
Some other race	153	5.3%
Two or more races	312	10.9%
Hispanic or Latino (of any race)	434	15.1%

=== 2000 census ===
As of the census of 2000, there were 2,992 people, 1,019 households, and 814 families residing in the CDP. The population density was 1,398.3 inhabitants per square mile (539.9/km^{2}). There were 1,045 housing units at an average density of 488.4 per square mile (188.6/km^{2}). The racial makeup of the CDP was 82.92% White, 9.09% African American, 4.38% Asian, 1.84% from other races, and 1.77% from two or more races. Hispanic or Latino of any race were 6.55% of the population.

There were 1,019 households, out of which 40.8% had children under the age of 18 living with them, 64.0% were married couples living together, 11.3% had a female householder with no husband present, and 20.1% were non-families. 16.8% of all households were made up of individuals, and 6.5% had someone living alone who was 65 years of age or older. The average household size was 2.93 and the average family size was 3.29.

In the CDP, the population was spread out, with 29.2% under the age of 18, 5.7% from 18 to 24, 30.4% from 25 to 44, 22.4% from 45 to 64, and 12.3% who were 65 years of age or older. The median age was 37 years. For every 100 females, there were 96.3 males. For every 100 females age 18 and over, there were 94.9 males.

The median income for a household in the CDP was $60,994, and the median income for a family was $67,019. Males had a median income of $44,511 versus $33,281 for females. The per capita income for the CDP was $22,149. About 1.5% of families and 2.0% of the population were below the poverty line, including 3.0% of those under age 18 and 2.7% of those age 65 or over.

== Education ==
Most of the CDP is in the Spackenkill Union Free School District, while a portion is in the Wappingers Central School District. The sole comprehensive high school of the Spackenkill district is Spackenkill High School.
