= Stardance =

1979 novel by Spider Robinson

- First edition covers
- Author: Spider Robinson; Jeanne Robinson
- Cover artist: Larry Kresek
- Language: English
- Series: The Stardance Trilogy
- Genre: Science fiction
- Publisher: Dial Press; Quantum
- Publication date: 1979
- Publication place: USA
- Pages: 278
- ISBN: 978-0-8037-8232-7
- OCLC: 4499006
- LC Class: 78-11231
- Followed by: Starseed

Stardance is a science fiction novel by Spider Robinson and Jeanne Robinson, published by Dial Press in 1979 as part of its Quantum science fiction line. The novel's opening segment originally appeared in Analog in 1977 as the novella "Stardance", followed by the serialized conclusion, "Stardance II", in Analog in 1978.

After the Dial hardcover appeared in 1979, Stardance was reprinted in paperback by Dell Books in 1980, followed by reissues from Tor Books and Baen Books over the next decade. Baen compiled the novel, together with its sequel, Starseed, in a mass market paperback omnibus, The Star Dancers, in 1997; in 2006, Baen published a hardcover omnibus, The Stardance Trilogy, adding a third novel, Starmind.

== Reception ==
Algis Budrys declared Stardance to be "a reading experience which genuinely evokes a basic human feeling ... that within each of us dwells something glorious that is beyond mortal error, is the seed of an angel," concluding that "Stardance sweeps over the reader with the uncommon power attainable only by the social extrapolations of SF, and then rarely."

== Awards ==
The novella "Stardance" won both the Hugo and Nebula awards as well as the annual Locus Poll. The novel Stardance placed fourth in the Locus Poll two years later.
