= Time Pressure =

Time pressure may refer to:

- Time poverty - subjective experience of a lack of free time
- Time pressure regions in spatial planning - delineation of regions in geography through correlation between space, time and activities given by Amartya Deb
- Time Pressure - a science fiction novel by Spider Robinson, and an independent sequel to Mindkiller
- Time & Pressure
- Time trouble - nearing time control in a timed game such as chess
