= Star seed =

Star seed or starseed may refer to:

== Music ==
- Starseed (band), South-African/British rock band
- "Starseed" (song), a 1994 single by Our Lady Peace
- Star Seed, a 2021 single by Loona

== Literature ==
- Starseed (novel), a 1991 science fiction novel by Spider Robinson and Jeanne Robinson
- Starseed, a 1973 book by Timothy Leary
- Starseeds, fictional microorganisms used by Outsiders to seed new planets with life in Larry Niven's Known Space science fiction series

== Other uses ==
- Starseed launcher, a hypothetical concept of a space exploration system
- Starseeds (New Age), individuals who state they have originated from another planet or galaxy
- Star seeds, a type of crystal in sentient life in the Sailor Moon: Sailor Stars series

== See also ==
- "Space Seed", an episode of the television series Star Trek
