= Hard Choices (disambiguation) =

Hard Choices is a memoir of former United States Secretary of State Hillary Rodham Clinton.

Hard Choices may also refer to:

- Hard Choices (film), a 1985 American crime film
- Hard Choices (graphic novella), a novella prequel to the movie Ultramarines: A Warhammer 40,000 Movie, written by Dan Abnett
- Hard Choices (Coward book), a non-fiction compilation book about climate change in Canada, edited by Harold Coward
- Hard Choices (Moore book), a non-fiction compilation book about humanitarianism on the international arena, edited by Jonathan Moore
- Very Hard Choices, a novel by Canadian science fiction author Spider Robinson
