= Alex Grey =

American visual artist and author (born 1953)

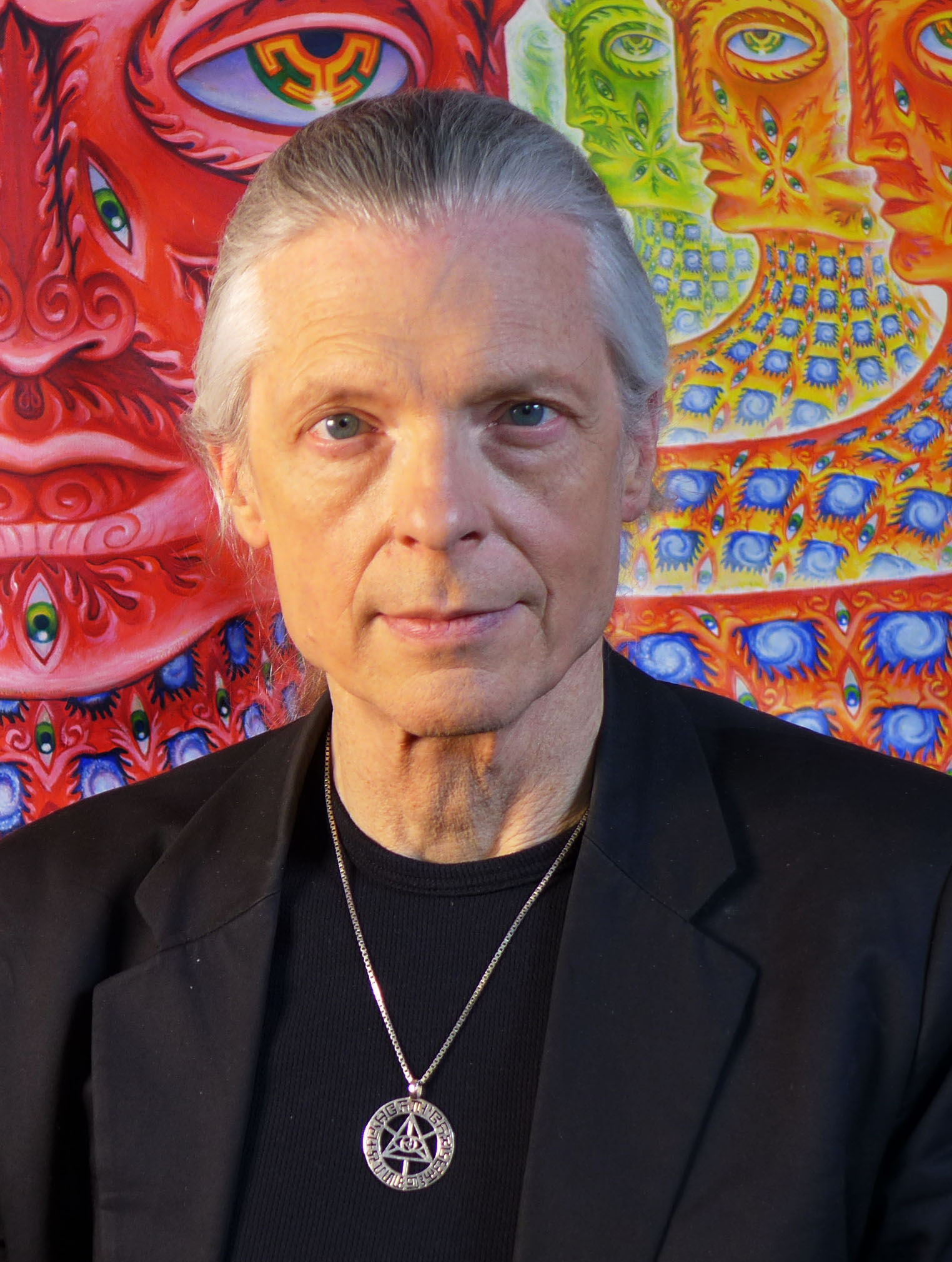
- Grey in 2013
- Born: November 29, 1953 (age 72); Columbus, Ohio, U.S.
- Education: School of the Museum of Fine Arts at Tufts
- Known for: Painting, illustration
- Notable work: The Chapel of Sacred Mirrors
- Movement: Visionary art, psychedelic art
- Spouse: Allyson Grey
- Website: www.alexgrey.com

Alex Grey (born November 29, 1953) is an American visual artist, author, teacher, and Vajrayana practitioner known for creating spiritual and psychedelic artwork such as his 21-painting Sacred Mirrors series. He works in multiple forms including performance art, process art, installation art, sculpture, visionary art, and painting. He is also on the board of advisors for the Center for Cognitive Liberty and Ethics, and is the Chair of Wisdom University's Sacred Art Department. He and his wife Allyson Grey are the co-founders of The Chapel of Sacred Mirrors (CoSM), a non-profit organization in Wappingers Falls, New York.

== Early life and education ==
Grey was born Alexander Velzy on November 29, 1953, in Columbus, Ohio. His father was a graphic designer and artist. Grey was the middle child. He attended the Columbus College of Art and Design for two years before dropping out. Grey went on to study art at the School of the Museum of Fine Arts at Tufts in Boston in 1975. At the end of art school, Grey met his wife Allyson at a party where they both ingested LSD and later bonded over the experience. He reported that the LSD was initially given to him by his professor.

== Career ==
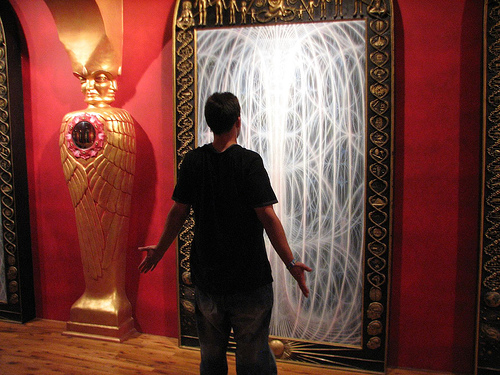
A viewer in front of Grey's art in 2007

Grey learned anatomy by working to prepare cadavers for dissection at Harvard Medical School's anatomy department, a position he held for five years. He worked as a medical illustrator for approximately ten years in order to support his studio art practice. Grey also taught anatomy and figure sculpture at New York University for ten years. Grey is best known for his psychedelic paintings and illustrations. In 1986, Grey's artwork was exhibited at the New Museum in New York City.

Alex and Allyson Grey have worked collaboratively and have openly supported the use of entheogens. Mending the Heart Net, an interactive installation artwork by Alex and Allyson Grey, was displayed at Baltimore's American Visionary Art Museum in 1998–99 as part of the exhibition "Love: Error and Eros".

In 1999, the Museum of Contemporary Art San Diego held a mid-career retrospective of Grey's work titled "Sacred Mirrors: The Visionary Art of Alex Grey". That same year, Grey was noticed by guitarist Adam Jones of the rock band Tool, who later featured his artwork on their albums Lateralus, 10,000 Days, and Fear Inoculum.

Illustrations created by Grey have been selected to appear on albums for musical groups such as the Beastie Boys, Nirvana, Meshuggah, and The String Cheese Incident. Newsweek magazine and the Discovery Channel have featured his artwork. His images have been printed onto sheets of blotter acid and have been used on flyers to promote Rave events.

Grey's artwork has been exhibited worldwide, including at Feature Inc., Tibet House US, Stux Gallery, MoMA PS1, the Outsider Art Fair, the Grand Palais in Paris, and the Sao Paulo Biennial in Brazil. Grey has been a keynote speaker at conferences in Tokyo, Amsterdam, Basel, Barcelona, and Manaus. In the 2012 book Psychedelia, author Patrick Lundborg credits Grey as "the leading psychedelic artist of today, and also one of the foremost proponents of Visionary Art as a style."

Since 2020, the Greys have hosted a podcast about religion, science, visionary art, nature, meditations, and full-moon ceremonies. The pair has interviewed artists, philosophers, YouTubers, musicians, and PhD candidates.

=== The Chapel of Sacred Mirrors ===
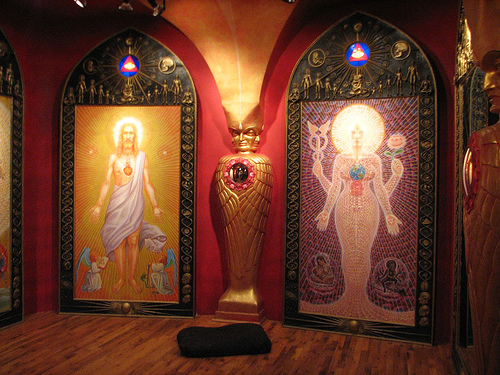
Inside the Chapel of Sacred Mirrors

Grey founded the Foundation for Sacred Mirrors, a 501(c)(3) organization, as a place to permanently display the Chapel of Sacred Mirrors. Additionally, he created the Church of Sacred Mirrors (CoSM).

The CoSM provides a space for meditation and worship; visitors can also admire Grey's artwork and writings, as well as works by invited artists. According to the CoSM's website, "The mission of CoSM is to build an enduring sanctuary of visionary art to inspire a global community." Located in Wappinger, New York, visitors can explore 40 acres featuring art by Alex Grey, Allyson Grey, and Amy Senn, among others. Murals by Grey and others are in the cafeteria. The property also includes a 10-bedroom Victorian guest house decorated with visionary art. Much of Grey's work is displayed in Entheon, a converted carriage house, which the Greys are fundraising to complete. Visitors enter through bronze doors inscribed with "Creating a Better World" by Grey. While in Entheon, visitors can also admire Grey's works Kissing, Copulating, Pregnancy, Birth, Gaia, Net of Being (featured by the band Tool), and Nursing.

Grey's project the Chapel of Sacred Mirrors first opened to the public in Chelsea, New York, in 2004 and drew visionary and psychedelic art fans to the site for four years until its closure in December 2008. The CoSM featured 20 life-size paintings of standing human figures Grey created in the early 1980s. The Greys reopened CoSM in Wappingers Falls, New York, a community within Hudson Valley.

=== Painting ===
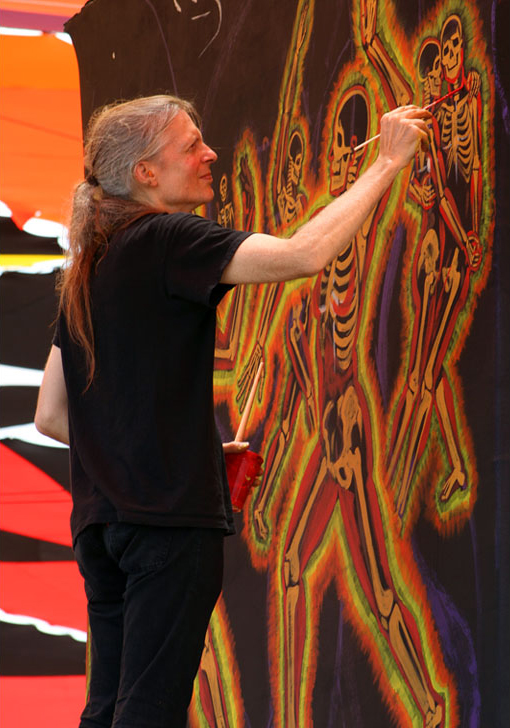
Alex Grey painting in 2007

Grey's paintings are a blend of sacred art, visionary art, postmodern art, and psychedelic art. He is best known for his paintings of glowing anatomical human bodies, images that "x-ray" the multiple layers of reality. His art is a complex integration of body, mind, and spirit. The Sacred Mirrors, a life-sized series of 21 paintings, took 10 years to complete, and examines in detail the physical and metaphysical anatomy of the individual. "The inner body is meticulously rendered - not just anatomically precise but crystalline in its clarity". Many of his paintings include detailed representations of the skeleton, nervous system, cardiovascular system, and lymphatic system. Grey applies this multidimensional perspective to paint the universal human experience. His figures are shown in positions such as praying, meditating, kissing, copulating, pregnancy, birth, and death.

Grey's work incorporates many religious symbols, including auras, chakras, and icons with geometric shapes and tessellations in natural, industrial, and multicultural situations. Grey's paintings are permeated by an intense, subtle light.

"It is the light that is sublime in Grey's oeuvre - which is the most important innovation in religious light since the Baroque - and that makes the mundane beings in them seem sublime, in every realistic detail of their exquisite being".

His paintings are described as spiritual and scientific, and as revealing his psychedelic, spiritual, and supernatural view of the human species.

In 2002, Holland Cotter, New York Times art critic, wrote, "Alex Grey's art, with its New Age symbolism and medical-illustration finesse, might be described as psychedelic realism, a kind of clinical approach to cosmic consciousness. In it, the human figure is rendered transparently with X-ray or CAT-scan eyes, the way Aldous Huxley saw a leaf when he was on mescaline. Every bone, organ and vein is detailed in refulgent color; objects and space are knitted together in dense, decorative linear webs."

=== Writing ===
In 1990, Grey published a large-format art book, Sacred Mirrors: The Visionary Art of Alex Grey. The book included essays on the significance of Grey's work by Ken Wilber, and by New York art critic, Carlo McCormick.

Grey's The Mission of Art, a philosophy of art, originally published in 1998 with a foreword by Ken Wilber, was reissued in 2017. The book traces the evolution of human consciousness through art history, explores the role of an artist's intention and conscience, and reflects on the creative process as a spiritual path. He promotes the mystical potential of art and argues that the process of artistic creation plays an important role in the enlightenment of both the artist and the broader culture.

In Transfigurations, published in 2001, Grey addresses his portrayals of light bodies, performance works, his collaborative relationship with Allyson Grey, and their quest to build a Chapel of Sacred Mirrors.

Sounds True has released The Visionary Artist, a CD of Grey's reflections on art as a spiritual practice.

Grey co-edited the book, Zig Zag Zen: Buddhism and Psychedelics (Chronicle Books, 2002, reprinted by Synergetic Press, 2015).

Alex Grey has published a 10-volume journal featuring his own artistic works and those of other visionary thinkers and philosophers.

=== Film ===
As an advocate for sacred art, Grey was the subject of the 2004 documentary ARTmind: the healing potential of sacred art.

Grey and the Chapel of Sacred Mirrors gallery in New York City were featured in the 2006 documentary CoSM The Movie, directed by Nick Krasnic.

Grey appeared in the 2006 film Entheogen: Awakening the Divine Within, a documentary about rediscovering an enchanted cosmos in the modern world.

He also appeared in the film DMT: The Spirit Molecule, in which he talked about the importance of the substance DMT in the past and present world, as well as describing some of his personal experiences with the substance and how it influenced his painting.

Grey appeared in the 2016 documentary film Going Furthur.

== Personal life ==
In 2008, the San Francisco Chronicle reported that Grey lived in New York City with his wife, painter Allyson Grey. They have one daughter, Zena Grey. Grey is a member of the Integral Institute, formed by his friend Ken Wilber.

== Necrophilia controversy ==
Grey is said to have had sex with a mutilated female corpse while working at a morgue in March 1976. This was part of his controversial performance art piece Necrophilia and was photographed by his wife Allyson Grey. The story was subsequently described in 1981 and thereafter and a recreated photograph of the act was distributed in several publications, including in WET Magazine and High Performance Magazine among others, with authors including Lewis MacAdams, Linda Frye Burnham, and Grey himself. Following revelations during a subsequent high-dose LSD trip, Grey described the act as "probably the worst thing I've ever done" and as feeling "disgraced and disgusted with myself" for it, deciding from then on to do only positive rather than negative or harmful works. In his 1998 book The Mission of Art however, Grey wrote that he does not regret his early "dark works" like Necrophilia, as they pushed him towards more virtuous work.

Grey's disclosure of Necrophilia (1976) quickly followed American artist John Duncan's similar performance art piece Blind Date (1980), in which Duncan described having sex with a female corpse in Tijuana, Mexico and released an audiotape of the act. Subsequently, MacAdams published a pamphlet called Blind Date (1981) that detailed both Duncan's and Grey's works involving sex with corpses. The art community is said to have been horrified by Duncan's Blind Date (1980) piece. As a result of the piece, Duncan was informally banned from the art community, shunned even by his close friends, and eventually relegated to self-imposed exile outside of the United States. There were also attempts to have him legally prosecuted. Women were said to have felt particularly violated by Duncan's work. Conversely, although Grey describes his early dark works like Necrophilia (1976) as likewise having resulted in serious professional consequences, his own piece has been much less well-known, and Grey nonetheless went on to become a renowned visionary artist, for instance with his subsequent Sacred Mirrors (1979–1988) works.

== In fiction ==
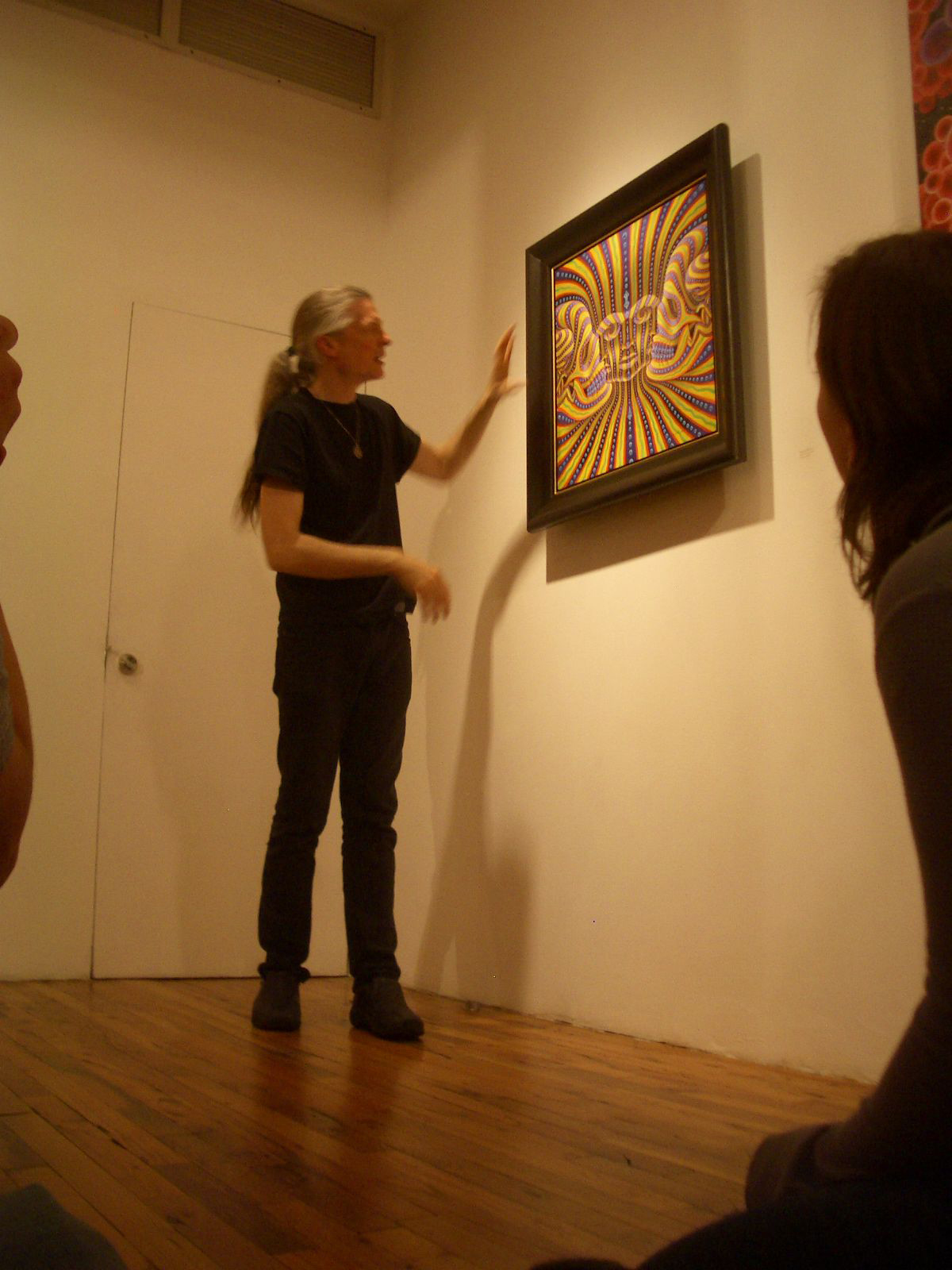
Grey in 2007 with one of his artworks

In Variable Star, a 2006 science fiction novel written by Spider Robinson based on a story outline by Robert A. Heinlein, Robinson devotes several pages to his protagonist's discovery of Grey's Sacred Mirrors and Progress of the Soul series, and to using them to enhance meditation.

== Publications ==
- 1990: Sacred Mirrors: The Visionary Art of Alex Grey, Inner Traditions - Bear & Company, ISBN 0-89281-314-8
- 1998: The Mission of Art, Shambhala Publications Inc., ISBN 978-1570623967
- 2001: Transfigurations, Inner Traditions - Bear & Company, ISBN 0-89281-851-4
- 2007: CoSM, Chapel of Sacred Mirrors (Alex Grey & Allyson Grey), CoSM Press, ISBN 978-160402-121-9
- 2008: Art Psalms, North Atlantic Books, ISBN 978-1-55643-756-4
- 2012: Net of Being (Alex Grey & Allyson Grey), Inner Traditions - Bear & Company, ISBN 978-1594773846
- 2015: Zig Zag Zen: Buddhism and Psychedelics, (Ed. Allan Badiner, Alex Grey), Synergetic Press, ISBN 9780907791621
