= Abraham Brower House =

Historic house in New York, United States

- U.S. National Register of Historic Places
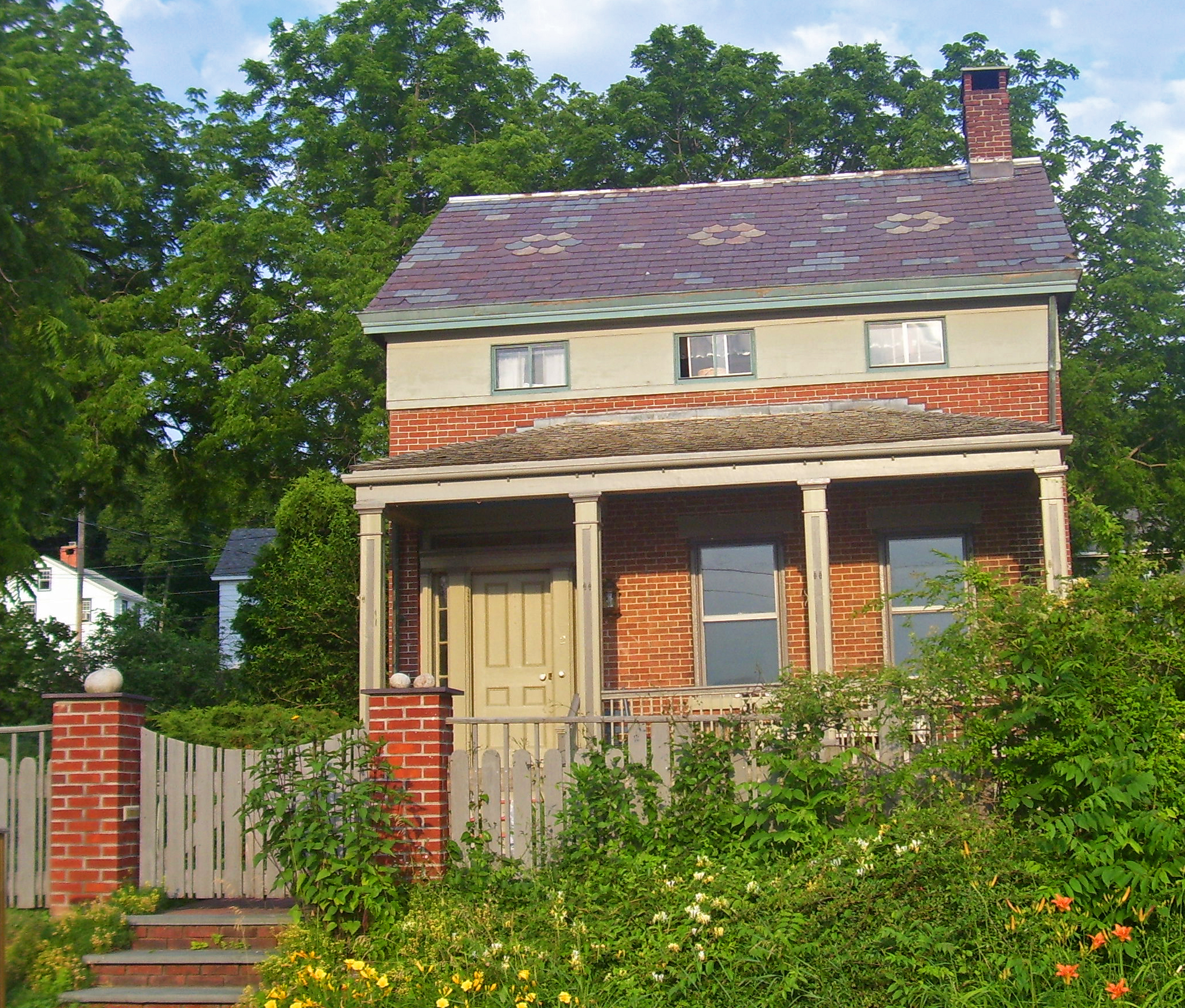
- Front (west) elevation, 2008

- Location within New York Location within the United States
- Location: New Hamburg, New York
- Nearest city: Poughkeepsie
- Coordinates: 41°35′20″N 73°56′59″W
- Built: ca. 1845
- Architectural style: Greek Revival
- MPS: New Hamburg MRA
- NRHP reference No.: 87000116
- Added to NRHP: 1987

The Abraham Brower House is located at Water and Division streets in New Hamburg, New York, United States. It is a mid-19th century home of one of the hamlet's early residents that was added to the National Register of Historic Places in 1987. It is opposite the Adolph Brower House, also on Water Street.

It is a modest brick structure, built in a vernacular interpretation of the Greek Revival style popular in the decades preceding its construction. A kitchen wing was added after the Civil War, but otherwise there have been few significant alterations since then.

== Building ==
The main block is a one-and-a-half-story, three-bay structure of brick laid in common bond. The gabled roof is shingled in slate laid in a decorative floral pattern. A chimney rises from the south side.

Across the west-facing front facade runs a hip-roofed porch. Its columns, and the doorway, match the nearby Adolph Brower House. The front windows are trimmed in stone.

A smaller, similar addition was built later on the east (rear) elevation. Its roof decoration matches the main house. A full-length porch on its south side has been enclosed in clapboard. There is also a small brick outbuilding with asphalt-shingled roof at the northwest corner of the house's lot.

The interior follows the classic Greek Revival side-hall pattern. Most rooms, save the kitchen, are as they originally were. Woodwork, especially a mantel in the parlor, is also preserved. A full brick beehive oven remains in the cellar of the addition.

== History ==
Adolph Brower, whose own house across the intersection is one of the oldest in New Hamburg, sold the lot to a relative, Abraham, in 1841. At the time both Browers were involved in the lime quarrying operations along the nearby riverside that were the hamlet's major industry after river commerce. The house, likely built around 1845 although the exact date is not known, had at the time an unobstructed view over the quarries.

It is first recorded in 1867, at which time the kitchen wing was added. Its roof was originally plain slate, but was later redecorated to match the main house. Similarly, the wing's tin-roofed porch was originally unenclosed, and modified sometime later in the 19th century.

Locally, it is believed that the outbuilding was originally a boathouse. Although modified during the 20th century for use as a garage, it is too small to have served as a stable prior to that and the low rafters on its collar beams were ideal places to hang sails to dry.
