= Starmind =

Starmind or Star Mind, may refer to:

- Starmind, a planned constellation of AI satellites proposed by SpaceX
- Starmind International, Swiss AI software company
- Starmind (novel), a 1994 science fiction novel by Spider Robinson and Jeanne Robinson
- Star Mind, a fictional character from the TV show B-Robo Kabutack
