= Adolph Brower House =

Historic house in New York, United States

- U.S. National Register of Historic Places
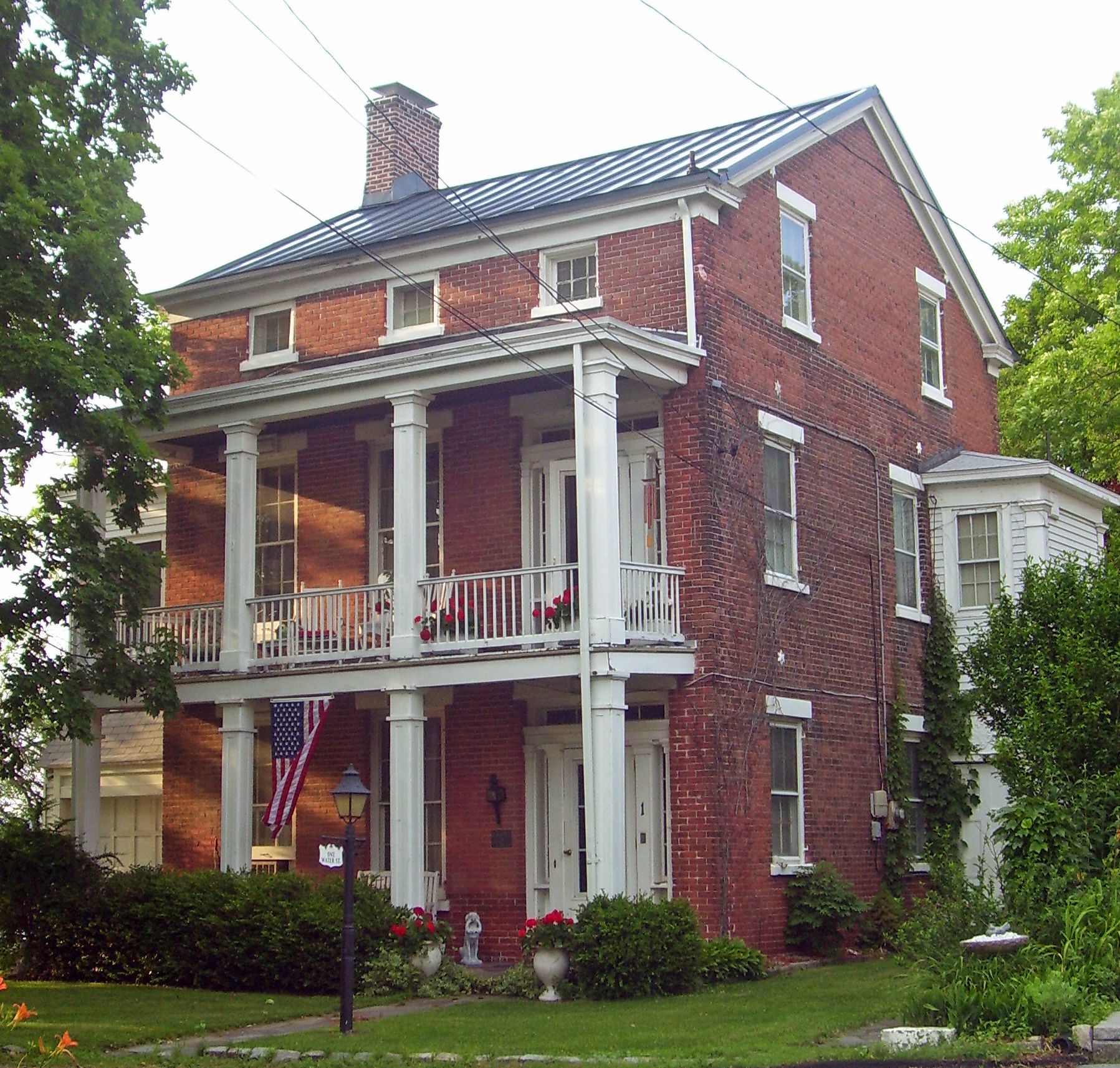
- Front (south) elevation and east profile, 2008

- Location within New York Location within the United States
- Location: New Hamburg, New York
- Nearest city: Poughkeepsie
- Coordinates: 41°35′22″N 73°56′59″W
- Built: ca. 1845
- Architectural style: Greek Revival
- MPS: New Hamburg MRA
- NRHP reference No.: 87000114
- Added to NRHP: 1987

The Adolph Brower House is located at the corner of Division and Water streets in New Hamburg, New York, United States, opposite the Abraham Brower House. It was listed on the National Register of Historic Places in 1982.

It was built around 1845 by Brower, a New York City native who owned a nearby lime quarry. A brick Greek Revival structure with many of the classic features of that style, it and the other Brower house are the oldest in New Hamburg to remain largely as they were originally built.

== Building ==
The house is at the southeast corner of a 1-acre (4,000 m^{2}) lot with a noncontributing swimming pool and outbuilding. Although it fronts on the stub end of Division Street (which once continued west to a dock) and is parallel with the other houses on that street, its address is Water Street.

It is a two-and-a-half-story, three-bay structure of brick laid in common bond topped with a slate gabled roof and wooden cornice. Two chimneys, one on the west exterior and an interior one from the northeast, rise from it. There are star-shaped anchor bolts between the stories on the east and west elevations.

The south (front) elevation has a two-story wooden porch with low hipped roof. Its square columns, duplicated in the porch of the Abraham Brower House on the opposite corner, have recessed panels and capitals. A similar single-bay porch, its upper level enclosed in clapboard, is attached to the east elevation. The front windows have stone sills and decorative lintels.

A third two-story porch on the west elevation, overlooking the nearby Hudson River, has also been enclosed with aluminum siding. The stone foundation comes up to the second floor here, behind the garage.

== History ==
A previous structure is shown on the site in an 1800 map, when the land was owned by early settler Ephraim DuBois. In 1837 Adolph Brower came up from New York City and bought the property. He built the house to overlook lime quarrying and kiln operations nearby. His customers were local pig iron producers and farmers and builders as far away as New Jersey, supplied by river boat.

In 1870 the superintendent of the Poughkeepsie Iron Works, Albert Tower, bought the house and property. He destroyed all the kilns and concentrated strictly on quarrying limestone, outcrops of which are still visible behind the house. Over the course of the 20th century, as New Hamburg's industries declined, the road was closed and the property relandscaped extensively. But other than the addition of some more modern building materials, and the exact rebuilding of some of the front porch trim, the house itself has not been altered.

== Aesthetics ==
Many of the features of the house typify it as Greek Revival. The gable returns, eyebrow windows, columned porch and side hall interior are particularly prominent. The entryway sidelights and transom, along with the finely done balustrade, are highly developed applications of the style.
