= Lifehouse =

Lifehouse or Life House may refer to:

== Churches ==
- Lifehouse, a CRC International church in Murray Bridge, South Australia; see CRC Churches International#Locations
- Lifehouse International Church, a network of churches in Asia

== Music ==
- Lifehouse (band), an American rock band
  - Lifehouse (album) (2005), the band's self-titled album
- Lifehouse (rock opera), an unfinished rock opera by the British rock band The Who

== Novels ==
- Life House, a graphic novel of the above noted rock opera, released in December 2023
- Lifehouse (novel), a science-fiction novel by Spider Robinson
  - The Lifehouse Trilogy, an omnibus volume of Spider Robinson's Mindkiller, Time Pressure, and Lifehouse

== See also ==
- Life as a House, a 2001 American drama film
