= Andrew Spence =

Andrew Spence may refer to:

- Andrew Spence (musician) (born 1983), South African drummer
- Andrew Spence (artist) (born 1947), American painter
- Andrew Michael Spence (born 1943), Canadian-American economist
