= New Hamburg rail disaster =

1871 fatal train collision

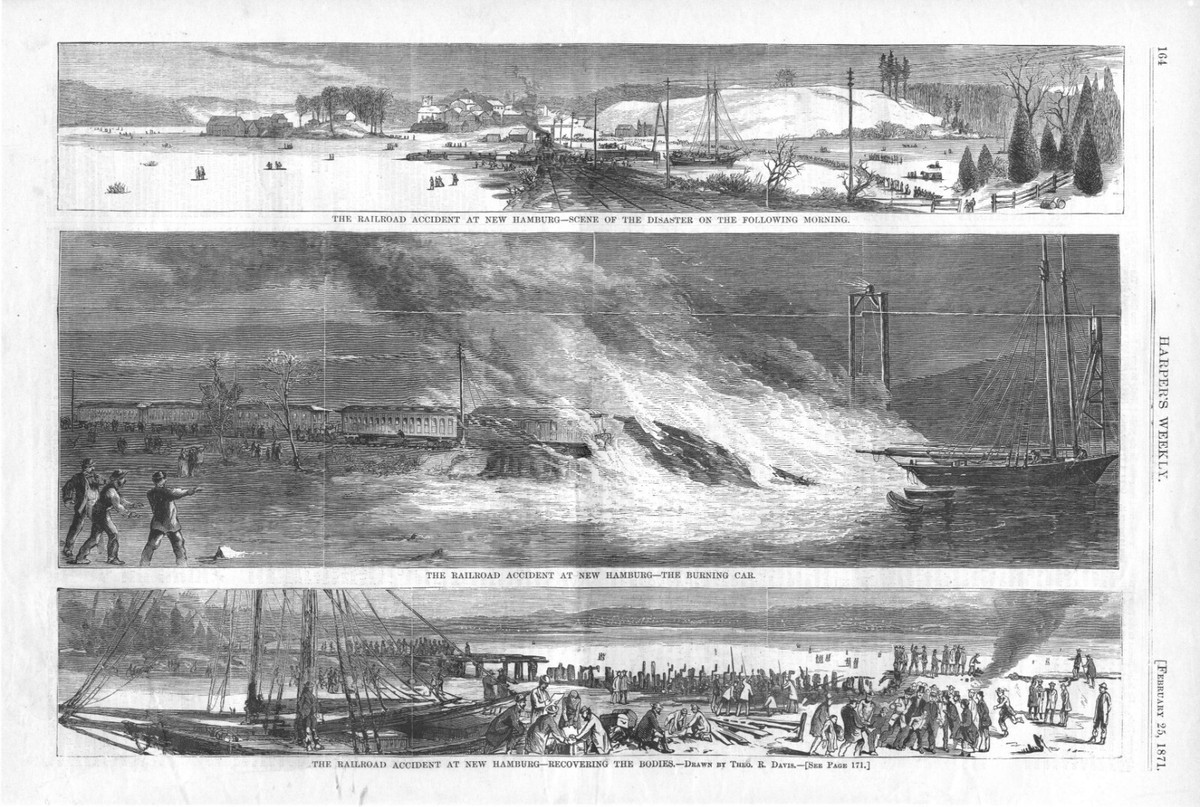
- Depiction of the fire and aftermath in Harper's Weekly

Details
- Date: February 6, 1871; Around 10:26 p.m.
- Location: New Hamburg, New York
- Coordinates: 41°34′56″N 73°56′50″W
- Line: Hudson River Railroad Line
- Incident type: Collision caused by derailment, fire
- Cause: Broken axle

Statistics
- Trains: 2
- Vehicles: 25 (freight train) & 7 (passenger train)
- Deaths: 22

On the night of February 6, 1871, a New York Central and Hudson River Railroad freight train partially derailed as it crossed a bridge over the mouth of Wappinger Creek at the hamlet of New Hamburg, New York, United States. When they realized what had happened, the freight's crew attempted to signal a passenger train coming in the opposite direction, but while its crew saw the signals they were unable to stop their train in time. The resulting collision on the bridge ignited kerosene in the freight's tank cars, causing an explosion and fire that collapsed the bridge and killed 22, all either passengers on that train or part of its crew.

Many factors led to the disaster. The night was particularly cold, leaving the metal parts of the train and some of the rails brittle. Members of the freight crew had not been where they were required to be, staying inside the train to keep warm. The train's conductor had not followed a recent safety procedure meant to improve communication between the caboose and the engineer. The passenger train's brakes were not ideal for stopping the train, heavy with sleeper cars, in the time necessary to avert the crash.

A coroner's jury blamed the crash on the engineer of the passenger train, who had been killed. Committees of both houses of the state legislature later heard testimony from survivors, but were more circumspect in assigning fault. A report intended to be the final word on the accident was destroyed in a fire before it could be published, and so no vote was taken before the legislature adjourned for the year.

== Background ==
On the night of the accident, a New York Central and Hudson River Railroad freight train, the "Extra Number 3", left Greenbush, New York, near Albany, heading south along the Hudson River, to make deliveries at various points south along the line. Its 25-car consist included 15 tank cars, most filled to their 500-barrel (21,000 US gal) capacity with kerosene.. In charge was conductor Edgar Underwood; his brother Charles was the middle brakeman.

It was midway through a two-week cold wave gripping the Northeast, including the Hudson Valley. Overnight lows had been below 0 °F (−18 °C), and the night of February 6 was no exception. Iron, such as the trucks of railcars at that time, where the wheels and axles were located, was prone to becoming brittle in the severe cold. The heavy weight of the oil cars would put further stress on their trucks, and accordingly Edgar Underwood made sure they were inspected before departure for any faults or cracks. However, he disregarded another recent company safety requirement, that a bell rope be strung from the caboose to the locomotive. The purpose was to allow the crew to the rear of the train to signal the engineer if there was some problem requiring the train be stopped, but Underwood believed it would be ineffective on a train as long as Number 3.

At 8:06 p.m., the railroad's Pacific Express passenger train left 34th Street Station on the West Side Line in Manhattan, bound for Buffalo and points west. It consisted of eight cars, five of which were large Wagner sleepers. The frigid temperatures also affected its operations. Even though the Pacific Express had left Manhattan six minutes late, John Toucey, the railroad's superintendent for the 142-mile (229 km) section between New York and Albany, told the engineer, Edward "Doc" Simmons, not to try to make up the lost time with increased speed, since the cold would possibly render some older iron sections of the track brittle and more prone to derailments. Also in the cab was James Humphrey, an unemployed friend of Simmons whom he was taking to Albany to look for railroad work there. This was a violation of company policy that forbade non-employees from riding in the cab, although that rule was often not enforced if the non-employee was a railworker.

On the Number 3, the Underwoods and the other brakeman all huddled in the caboose. Normally the brakemen would alternate tours of the train, during which they would not only be available to set or release brakes in a potential emergency but could spot those problems when they developed. But on this night Edgar Underwood, who expected only another routine run, told his brakemen to stay in the caboose and keep warm. Charles would later testify that the tank cars were difficult to walk on or around, and it was also too dangerous to carry a light when doing so.

The Pacific Express stopped at Dobbs Ferry to let a passenger off. By the time it reached Peekskill it was 17 minutes behind schedule. Further upriver, when it reached Fishkill Landing, a few miles south of New Hamburg, its punctuality had not improved. The fireman later said the engine "just wasn't steaming right", due to either poor-quality coal, the cold weather, or a combination of both. Simmons, by some accounts, seemed to have decided to ignore Toucey's admonition to put safety first; the train was reportedly reaching speeds of 40 mph (64 km/h), near the highest possible at that time.

== Initial derailment ==
Around 10:17 p.m., the Number 3 emerged from the short tunnel north of the station at the small hamlet of New Hamburg, 8.5 mi (13.7 km) south of Poughkeepsie and 65 mi (105 km) north of New York. It did not have to stop there and did not plan to, although there would be a stop not far to the south at the Old Troy water tower across the mouth of Wappinger Creek from the station, so it was slowing down to a speed Row estimated at 7–8 miles per hour (11–13 km/h). Dan Carroll, the station's switchman, noticed sparks coming from the tracks underneath one of the tank cars near the middle of the train, indicating a likely broken axle. He looked for someone to alert. That would normally have been the middle brakeman, but there was no one in that position on the train's exterior. Instead he called out to the men in the caboose as it passed.

As it passed over the switch just south of the station, the axle broke in two, causing the car it was on to bounce along the tracks. Without the bell rope, Underwood had no way to signal the locomotive. He and the brakemen in the caboose tried instead to get the attention of front brakeman John Bartlett by waving lanterns from the windows. But Bartlett was in the locomotive cab, shoveling coal into the furnace, which the train's fireman allowed him to do on cold nights in order to keep warm.

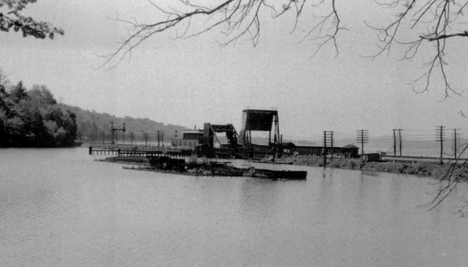
The drawbridge over Wappinger Creek

As the train crossed the 278-foot-long (85 m) wooden bridge with a drawbridge in the middle to allow boats passage from the Hudson into the creek, the disabled car struck a piling aside it and came loose from the train. At this point engineer Cornelius Row, already slowing the train for the water stop, felt the bump, and the load loosen, finally realizing there was a broken car along the consist. He told Barlett not to apply the brakes out of concern that the rear of the train would fail to slow down and make the situation worse. However, it had already separated. The damaged car spun around to a right angle, blocking the tracks. The railroad personnel went into emergency action. Carroll ran north along the tracks to set up as a flagman to stop a freight due to come along at any minute. The freight's engineer stopped the train and grabbed a red lantern to run down the track and warn the Pacific Express. As Row did he called "For God's sake, get out your red light!" to the watchman at the water tower.

== Collision, explosion and fire ==
On the track, the two men, frantically waving lanterns, saw the Pacific Express coming, the bright light on the front of its locomotive, known as the Constitution, clearly visible at a distance they estimated to be a mile (1.6 km) to the south. But from the locomotive the view was less clear, as the headlight was so bright that it was difficult at first for Simmons to see the two lanterns in its beam. He asked his fireman to look on his side of the train, but as his night vision had been dulled by looking into the furnace so much on the way up from New York, he could not see any more clearly.

As the train came closer, Simmons finally was able to make out the lanterns and the men holding them, but did not immediately slow the train. His conductor later speculated that, since Simmons knew that the Number 3 routinely stopped at Old Troy to take on water, that was what was happening and the lanterns were just the usual precaution taken. When they were able to make out the scene at the bridge, Simmons told his fireman to apply the train's patent brakes and blew the whistle three times to inform the brakemen to start setting every brake immediately. However, they had been designed to stop coaches, typically at the time 8–9 short tons (7.3–8.2 t), not the large, heavy sleeper cars on the Pacific Express, which weighed 30–40 short tons (27–36 t) each. While the train did begin to slow, it was still traveling at an estimated 25 mph (40 km/h), too fast to stop before hitting the derailed tank car. In a last-ditch effort, Simmons threw the train into reverse, but it was too late. The fireman jumped from the locomotive at the last second.

At 10:26 p.m., the Constitution struck the derailed oil car. They exploded into a fireball visible from several miles away. Witnesses said the flames rose as high as 150 ft (46 m). The force of the blast and ensuing fire destroyed the drawbridge, along with the baggage car and tender, sending the Pacific Express and several passenger cars into the frozen river below. The first sleeper, filled with Buffalo-bound passengers, also caught fire. Supports from the burning bridge also fell down on the waterlogged wreckage, further submerging it in the icy river.

== Aftermath ==
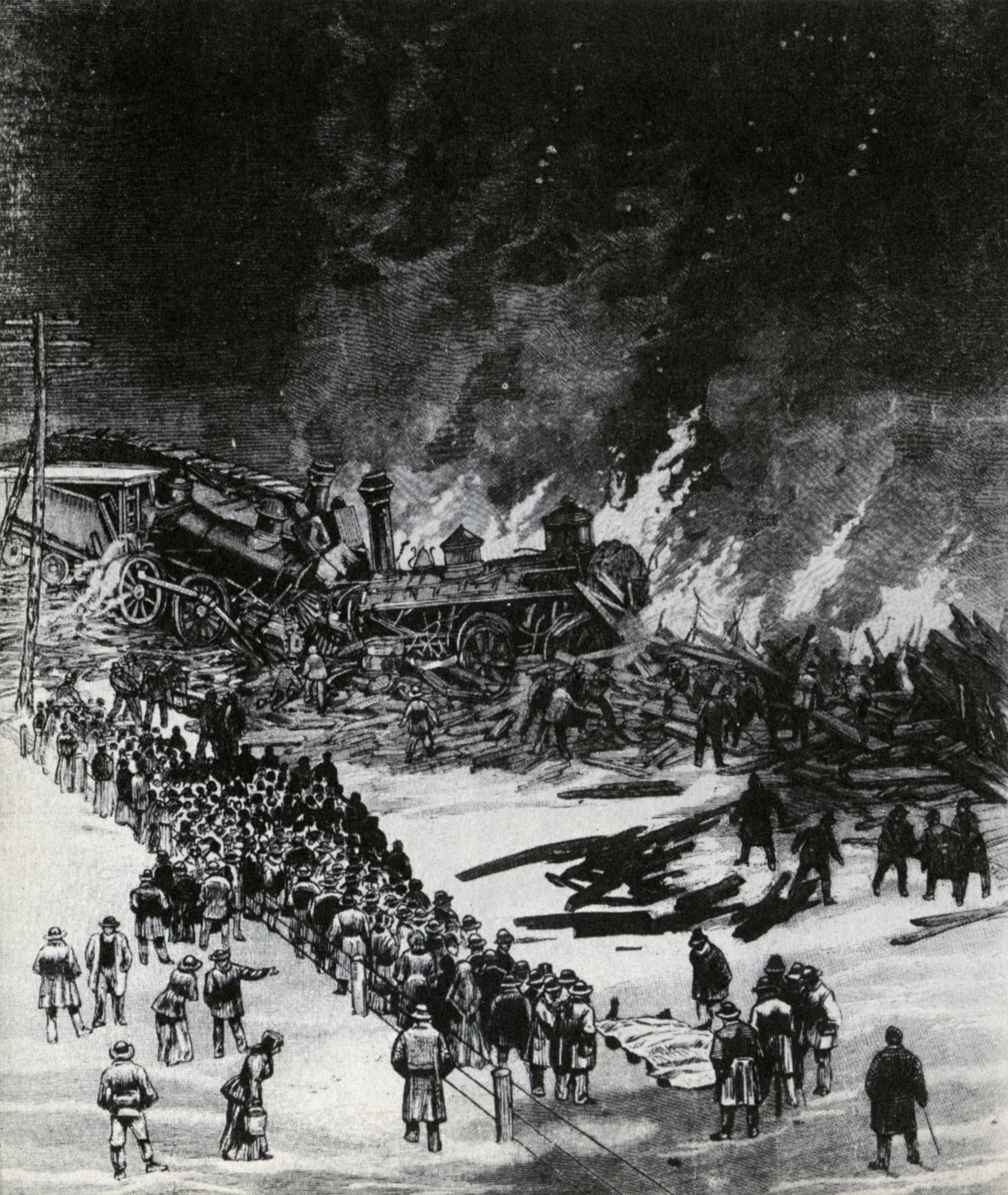
Contemporary newspaper illustration of wreck's aftermath

Immediately following the collision, uninjured passengers joined the crews to uncouple the remaining cars from the Pacific Express and push them off the bridge. Just after they did, the entire structure, sapped by the flames, collapsed into the creek. Firefighters from nearby Wappingers Falls rushed to the scene, along with curious local spectators. The New York Times reported that some of the onlookers, along with surviving train crew, looted the victims' bodies that had so far been found, until the Cold Spring station agent arrived at the scene brandishing his revolver at them. He was later joined in overseeing rescue, recovery and rebuilding operations by Doucey himself.

News of the disaster spread nationwide. Early estimates of the death toll ran as high as 70. In New York, the Tammany Hall political machine feared that some of its state legislators, who had been traveling to Albany to resume session, might be among the dead. Enough vacancies could cost Tammany's Democratic Party control of the Assembly and/or Senate, due to the narrow majorities it held in both. Relatives of passengers traveled to Poughkeepsie to await word and identify bodies if needed.

A train with a crane was dispatched to clear the site, as work proceeded to rebuild the bridge. In the interim trains north were diverted inland via the Dutchess & Columbia Railroad. Criticized in the press for appearing to care more about restoring service than recovering the bodies, the railroad hired a diver to venture into the submerged vehicles and recover whatever bodies were there. By February 9, most of the bodies had been recovered and the death toll revised downward as missing passengers were accounted for.

Over the next week, the diver and the crane focused on removing fragments of the cars and rails. This process attracted many onlookers, most of whom, the Times observed, seemed drawn more by the opportunity to watch a diver at work than any lingering interest in the accident. Wheels, rails, and other portions of the cars were described as being severely twisted and warped from the heat of the fire; bodies were severely burnt and mutilated. Chains were attached to the Constitution in order to raise it, but that work stalled a week after the accident due to a heavy snowstorm. When it resumed, no bodies were found aboard. On February 17, another diver exploring the bottom found Mooney's body, and then near it Simmons's and Humphrey's, one of the watches in his pocket stopped at 10:22.

When the dead were finally tallied, 22 victims (Note: The original higher estimates of the death toll have persisted. A 1906 Tribune article about a less deadly accident a mile south of the bridge stated that 40 lives had been lost. In 2011 the author of an Arcadia Publishing photo history of the town of Wappinger repeated that figure and added that Simmons had died rescuing trapped passengers.) had lost their lives including both crewmen of the Pacific Express. An article from the Brockport Republic identified the victims:

- George S. Benedict, Cleveland;
- Gillett, Buffalo;
- Arthur W. Pease and wife, Buffalo;
- Lucius A. Root, Buffalo;
- Germaine;
- Rev. Morrel Fowler, wife and three children;
- Dr. Samuel J. G. Nancreede;
- Robert Vosburgh, porter of the Wagner car;
- James Stafford, New York;
- U. Forbush, Buffalo;
- R. Thompson, New York;
- Peter Vosburgh, sleeping car conductor;
- M. Currey, Erie County, Pa.;
- H. Lowell, New York

== Investigation ==
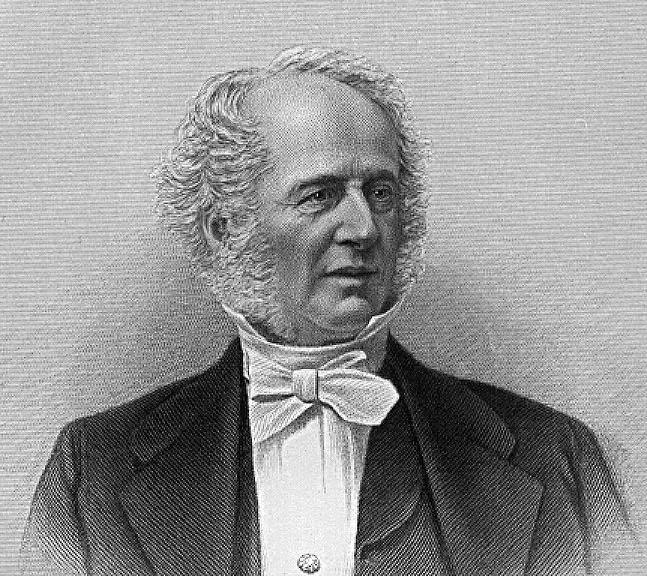
Cornelius Vanderbilt

Early reports blamed the railroad for the disaster, noting the many failures by its employees to follow its required safety procedures. The New York Tribune further alleged that two months earlier, a signalman assigned to the south end of the bridge had been laid off as the railroad decided that it only needed the water tower's watchman to signal oncoming trains. It debunked rumors that Cornelius Vanderbilt, who had through his founding of the railroad become one of the richest men in the country, had hanged himself out of remorse over the deaths.

Dutchess County coroner Dr. Charles Andrus, along with District Attorney Tristram Coffin, convened a coroner's jury to look into the accident. It met first on the morning of February 8, viewing one of the recovered bodies at a Poughkeepsie funeral parlor and then taking seats in a courtroom at the county courthouse to hear testimony. After two passengers testified, the Pacific Express's conductor, Charles Clossum, took the stand after lunch.

Clossum recounted how he had been in the rear of the first sleeper when he heard the whistle blow and immediately went to work with that car's conductor to set the brakes outside. He recalled the patent brakes going on and then the train going into reverse right before the crash and coordinating rescue efforts afterwards. The train had been running 17 minutes behind schedule and he did not believe it had been going fast, estimating its top speed at 30 mph (48 km/h). Even if it had been on time, he believed the disaster would still have occurred. What might have prevented it would have been Simmons following procedure at that time and going into reverse at the same time he ordered the patent brakes applied.

When the freight crew took the stand over a week later, Charles Underwood said he had never had orders in his two months working on the railroad to remain outside and stand atop any of the cars. Due to the extreme cold, the difficulty in traveling over the tank cars and the safety hazards created by carrying a lantern when doing so, his brother told him to stay in the caboose except when the train stopped. They did not leave it even when they normally would have, after clearing the short tunnel north of the New Hamburg station, since that night they did not plan to stop for water at Old Troy. Underwood heard the alarm as well as the switchman's warning, and began setting brakes immediately afterwards, until the derailment.

John Bartlett, the first brakeman, also verified that he had never received orders to be outside on the top of the train at any point during any run in his time on the job. Sometimes there had been orders to string up a bell-rope, but not that night. At the time of the derailment, he was not aware of any signals from the rear of the train or the New Hamburg switchman indicating a problem.

Last to testify were Henry Merritt and James Cunningham, the watchman at the water tower and former watchman at the bridge, respectively. Merritt said that the light at the bridge could have been changed in a minute and a half. If he had been able to do that, or anything that might have prevented the wreck, he would have. Cunningham said he had been able to climb the 43-foot (13 m) ladder and change the bridge light in a minute in the past; express passenger trains with sleepers, once seeing it, had been able to stop in time. He had no doubt he would have been able to change that light the night of the wreck had he still been on the job.

With testimony concluded, the jury was charged with several questions:

- Had the freight crew properly discharged their duties? Would Charles Underwood have discovered the broken axle sooner had he been at the middle of the train? Could he have signaled the engineer? Would Bartlett have been able to see the signals from the caboose had he not been doing the fireman's usual job? Should Edgar Underwood be held responsible for not making his brother and the other brakeman take their usual posts? Was he negligent in disregarding the order to install the bell-rope?
- Should Underwood and Merritt have instead tried to signal the Pacific Express from the water tower rather than the tracks?
- Does the railroad's rule that the tower lights can only be changed when the bridge is open still apply in an emergency situation?
- Did Simmons's failure to follow proper procedure and put the wheels in reverse before applying the brakes cause the crash?

On February 22, the jury returned its verdict: The crash most likely could not have been prevented. The freight crew, despite their failures to comply with railroad policy, had used all the means at their disposal to prevent the crash. The Pacific Express, however, was a half-mile (800 m) from the bridge when Simmons began trying to stop. Had he followed proper procedure, he could have avoided the collision. The jury could not say why he did not.

Many observers were dissatisfied. It seemed too easy to blame a man who had died. It was noted that the seven members of the jury included a local public official and two rail executives. All the members were among the area's more affluent citizens, and might, it was suggested, own stock in the Central. The state legislature promised it, too, would investigate, and the Assembly and State Senate empaneled a joint committee which began holding hearings in March.

The testimony this time was more complex and did not lend itself to easy assignment of blame. The committee voted to have a report prepared so the whole legislature could vote on it. But before that could happen, the only copy of the report was destroyed in what was said to have been an accidental fire at the print shop. The session ended without any vote being taken; an outcome seen as showing deference to the powerful railroad. In April, the Times opined of the whole affair that "it seems the great railroad legislature of 1871 has made another claim to the title."

== Legacy ==
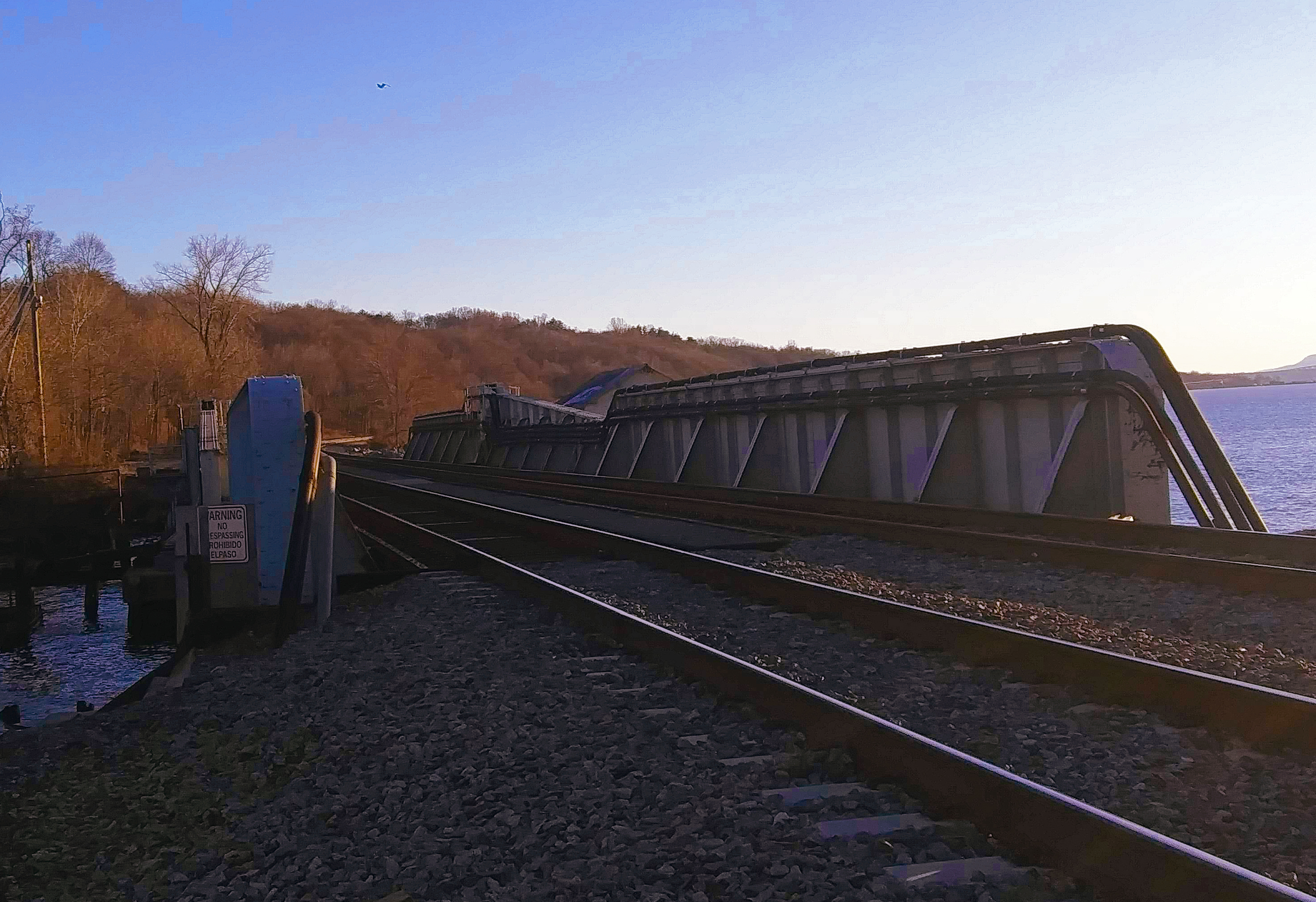
Wreck site, seen in 2024

The New Hamburg disaster inspired poet Benjamin Franklin Taylor to pen 'The Hero of New Hamburg' honoring the bravery of Simmons and Mooney for their effort to stop the Pacific Express.

Legends of the accident also surround the nearby John Lawson House. The mannequins seated on the porch of the house are said to be haunted by the victims of the 1871 tragedy. One legend says they will position themselves facing the drawbridge where the accident occurred.

The drawbridge infrastructure was removed and the bridge was permanently affixed in the closed position sometime around the 1990s. It carries primarily passenger trains on the Metro-North Hudson Line, which still serves the New Hamburg station, and Amtrak's Empire Service, which does not.

== See also ==
- 1871 in rail transport
- 1871 in the United States
- List of bridge failures
- List of rail accidents (before 1880)
- List of American railroad accidents
