= Andrew Spence (musician) =

- Born: Andrew James Spence; May 9, 1983 (age 42)
- Origin: Edenvale, JHB, Gauteng
- Genres: Rock, progressive rock
- Occupation: Drummer
- Instruments: Drums, vocals
- Years active: 1995–present
- Labels: FeedMe Music, Venus Fridge, WP Music

Andrew James Spence (born May 9, 1983) is a drummer and a founding member of Hard Rock band, Starseed. He performed briefly with New Zealand progressive rock group, Agent and has also performed and recorded with Hip-Hop Crossover band The Spindle Sect. He is also known as Animal Andy from his work as a DJ on UK Based Internet radio station Totalrock which later became Bloodstock Radio.

== Bio ==
Andrew was born on 9 May 1983 in Johannesburg, South Africa. At the age of 12, Andrew was hit with the drumming bug after a "2 week rebirth" into the world of rock n´ roll when he first heard John Bonham's work on Led Zepp's legendary "Achilles Last Stand". "I couldn’t put the CD down" exclaims Andrew, "I would get home from school and ritualistically I had to listen to that song at least 3 times a day and after about 2 weeks of this, my parents lives would change for the “worse" when I said ‘I wanna be a drummer’!". Andrew was taught his craft at his local church and at the age of 15 won a special award for Best Drummer at one of South Africa´s biggest music competitions. Along with brother Russell Spence (vocals, guitars), Starseed was formed in January 2000 and the band relocated to London (UK) in 2001. Starseed have powered into the UK Music scene since the release of their album "Peace Machine" in Aug 2009 with features in Kerrang! Magazine, XFM live sessions and touring the UK extensively. Highlights of 2010 have included an O2 Academy Summer Tour with rap/rock heavyweights, Senser and slots at Download Festival and Hard Rock Hell IV. More recently Andrew has been playing with Crossover Rap/Rock band The Spindle Sect and recorded their most recent album Bubonic Tronic, released in April 2012.

Andrew currently endorses Tama Drums & Hardware, Sabian Cymbals and Protection Racket.

== Hiatus with Starseed ==
On 2 May 2012, the band announced that they were taken an indefinite break.

== Agent ==
Andy joined progressive rock band Agent for a brief period in 2012 and can be seen in their video for "Lunatic" from their album "Kingdom Of Fear".

== I Am I ==
Filled in for ZP Theart's "I Am I" at Download Festival 2013, playing 2 sets on Sunday 16 June. One of the Jägermeister Acoustic Stage and later that day on the Red Bull Stage.

== Discography ==
=== With Starseed ===
- 2001 Starseed – ...too short to reminisce
- 2004 Starseed – Reborn EP
- 2005 Starseed – All the things they can't take away...
- 2006 Starseed – Love's War EP
- 2009 Starseed – Peace Machine

=== With The Spindle Sect ===
- 2012 The Spindle Sect – Bubonic Tronic

=== With Ethel My Love ===
- 1999 Ethel My Love – Beautiful (Single)

=== With Deep Kick ===
- 1998 Deep Kick – Skin EP
