= Telempath =

1976 novel by Spider Robinson

- First edition (publ. Berkley Books); Cover art by Richard M. Powers
- Author: Spider Robinson
- Genre: Science fiction
- Publisher: Putnam
- Publication date: December 1, 1976

Telempath is a science fiction novel by Canadian writer Spider Robinson, set in a dystopian near-future in which human cities have fallen into ruin and the population has been sharply reduced. The novel, Robinson's first, is an expansion of his 1977 Hugo Award-winning novella By Any Other Name. It was first published under the Berkley imprint of G. P. Putnam's Sons in 1976.

== Plot summary ==
The novel's protagonist, Isham Stone, is on a mission to kill the man allegedly responsible for the destruction of civilization: a scientist named Wendell Carlson, currently living alone at the former Columbia University in what used to be New York City.

Isham has been told by his father, scientist Jacob Stone, that Carlson is a madman who brought the world to its current state by releasing a "hyperosmic plague": a virus that increases the sensitivity of the human sense of smell by many hundred times. With their senses of smell thus heightened, humans were unable to tolerate the odors produced by their own pollution-producing technology; the result was mass insanity and widespread rioting.

Another result was the discovery of a species of "Muskys" — intelligent plasmoids — that live in the Earth's upper atmosphere and feed on human pollutants. The curtailment of technological activity has caused them to approach the planet's surface and attack human beings, on whose fear they are apparently able to feed.

Isham sets out for New York and succeeds in locating Carlson. He learns from Carlson, however, that the man actually responsible for developing and releasing the plague is Isham's father Jacob. Isham returns to his home colony and sets a trap to kill his father, then returns to New York.

The original novella "By Any Other Name" ends at this point. The novel continues as Isham's old teacher, Collaci, sets out to bring him back from New York to face a murder charge.

Isham is successfully captured, but before he can be tried, his colony is attacked by Agros (anti-technology worshippers of Pan) and he is taken prisoner.

Eventually Isham manages to bring about a measure of peace between the scientists and the neo-Luddites — and also learns that his father is not dead. The newly reconciled factions of humanity set out to rebuild civilization.

== Release details ==
- 1976, USA, Berkley (ISBN 0-399-11796-2), hardback (First edition. Cover art by 'Powers')
- 1977, USA, Berkley (ISBN 0-425-03548-4), Pub date Oct 1977, paperback
- 1978, UK, Macdonald & Jane (ISBN 0-354-04257-2), hardback
- 1983, USA, Tom Doherty Associates (ISBN 0-8125-5228-8), paperback (US reissue)
