= Variable Star =

Book by Robert Heinlein and Spider Robinson

- Author: Robert A. Heinlein & Spider Robinson
- Cover artist: Stephan Martinière
- Language: English
- Genre: Science fiction
- Publisher: Tor Books
- Publication date: September 19, 2006
- Publication place: United States
- Media type: Print (hardcover)
- ISBN: 0-7653-1312-X
- OCLC: 64427497
- Dewey Decimal: 813/.54 22
- LC Class: PS3515.E288 V37 2006

Variable Star is a 2006 science fiction novel by American author Spider Robinson, based on the surviving seven pages of an eight-page 1955 novel outline by Robert A. Heinlein, who died in 1988. The book is set in a divergent offshoot of Heinlein's Future History and contains many references to works by Heinlein and other authors. It describes the coming of age of a young musician who signs on to the crew of a starship as a way of escaping from a failed romance. Robinson posted a note on his website in 2009 noting that his agent had sold a trilogy of sequels based on the novel and its characters.

== From Heinlein to Robinson ==
The Heinlein Prize Trust selected Robinson to create a novel from Heinlein's outline; the outline, however, lacked an ending. Robinson's publishers encouraged him to write in his own style, not Heinlein's, and the abundance of profanity and puns makes it clear that this is not a Heinlein novel. The outline is almost exactly contemporaneous with Heinlein's juvenile novel Time for the Stars, and shares many of its details, such as the use of faster-than-light telepathic communication between twins. Although Heinlein apparently wrote the outline for Variable Star to be used, like Time for the Stars, as part of his Scribner's juvenile series, Robinson's realization deals with a variety of topics, including drugs and sexuality, that would have been completely unacceptable for a juvenile novel in 1955. Heinlein's original title for Variable Star was The Stars are a Clock.

== Plot ==
Eighteen-year-old aspiring musician and composer Joel Johnston, a Ganymedean on Earth for his education, falls in love with fellow college student Jinny Hamilton. Both are orphans and poor. When Jinny decides their relationship is ready to progress to marriage, she reveals that she is actually Jinnia Conrad, a granddaughter of humanity's richest man, Richard Conrad. Joel learns that Conrad has already mapped out his future; he is to be groomed for a role in the family business and to produce children to continue the dynasty. Determined to pursue his own destiny, he flees the Conrad estate with the help of Jinny's cousin, seven-year-old Evelyn.

To escape Richard Conrad's reach, Joel joins the crew of the RSS Charles Sheffield. The ship is headed to a distant star on a 20-year voyage to establish a colony, one of several scattered dozens of light-years from Earth. With experience from his family farm, Joel works as a farmer for the ship's crew of 500 and as a part-time musician. He regularly corresponds with Evelyn through the twins on board who maintain contact with Earth via telepathy with their siblings.

Six "relativists" are essential to the voyage, controlling the ship's quantum ramjet drive with their minds. The drive has to run continuously; at relativistic speeds, it is nearly impossible to restart it, and then only for a short period after it has stopped. Each relativist can only stand the strain reliably for six hours a day. Five years into the voyage, one is killed and another mentally incapacitated, leaving no margin for error.

The next year, the Sheffield learns through its telepaths that the Sun has gone nova, killing everyone in the Solar System. A wavefront of deadly gamma radiation is expanding at lightspeed, threatening the colonies that are all that is left of humanity. The crew is only able to warn one colony in time; the rest are doomed. The Sun going nova is contrary to all astrophysical theories, and because over 90% of the Sun's mass was converted into energy, it is suspected that an alien species caused the disaster. Unable to live with the catastrophe, one of the relativists commits suicide. Despite the other three's efforts, the quantum ramjet drive soon shuts down. The Sheffield will not be able to stop; it will coast by its intended destination at 97.6% of the speed of light.

A vessel overtakes the ship, however; Jinny married a genius scientist who has developed a revolutionary faster-than-light drive. Only one experimental ship exists, capable of carrying ten people; aboard are several Conrads, including the domineering Richard, Jinny, her husband, and Evelyn, who has aged faster than Joel because of time dilation. She is now 19, and explains that she persuaded her grandfather into coming to get him. Conrad proposes an evacuation plan, shuttling people to their destination planet nine at a time. Joel eventually realizes that Conrad is lying; he only contacted the Sheffield to obtain needed supplies and has no intention of returning. The businessman wants to establish control of the colonies and cannot spare the time. Conrad is defeated and the faster-than-light engine is transferred to the Sheffield.

Joel and Evelyn marry, then join the mission to warn the other colonies of the coming radiation wave. Joel decides to stay in space with his wife and child, rather than becoming planet-bound.

== Reception ==
The book received mixed reviews. SFF World felt it was written as though Heinlein himself were alive today, as it includes modern cultural references such as The Simpsons, but also noted some missteps, such as a section which reads,

Loving Zog’s Farms was another profound connection, one that went back in time almost as far as music. Plunging hands into soil together is very close to thrusting them into one another. And of course both of us were simultaneously fertile and ripe, a paradox whose metaphorical impossibility accurately reflects the turmoil of that condition.

Sci-Fi Dimensions was more enthusiastic, saying, "Variable Star is both a worthy continuation of the Heinlein legacy and a darn fine Spider Robinson novel to boot." Nicholas Whyte of Strange Horizons says, "This is, frankly, not a great book." He criticizes the opening chapters, a sentiment expressed by other reviewers such as SFF World, calling them atrocious, and SF Reviews calling the plot twists contrived and absurd.

== Connections ==
=== To Heinlein's works ===
Robinson includes a number of references to other works in Heinlein's Future History, though he does to attempt to fit with that history.

=== To other works ===
- The relativists who power the Sheffield's engine appear in an earlier Robinson story, though not under that title. The main character of the story is a relativist, who also invents time travel.
- Joel meets his first shipboard date when he is playing music and she accompanies him without him seeing her. This is similar to how Jake meets his wife in Robinson's Callahan stories.
- The characters Richie and Jules are references to the TV series Trailer Park Boys, which has as its main characters Ricky and Julian. Jules, like Julian, carries a drink at all times, and when the two are apprehended they give their names as "Corey Trevor and Jay Rock", other Trailer Park Boys characters. Finally their legal counsel is "Lahey", yet another Trailer Park Boys character.
- Conrad of Conrad's major domo, Alex Rennick, is called "Smithers" by Jinny, a reference to Waylon Smithers of The Simpsons.
- Survivor Gerald Knave is mentioned during the first town hall. Knave is the main character in a series of books by Laurence Janifer. The last Knave novel Janifer wrote has a plotline where Knave is hired to verify the authenticity of a just-found, never published Heinlein novel, Stone Pillow, that Heinlein listed in his Future History timeline but never wrote. It would have been the novel that introduced the Prophet, Nehemiah Scudder.
- One of the last lines of the book is a quote from Tennyson's Ulysses:

... my purpose holds
To sail beyond the sunset, and the baths
Of all the western stars, until I die.

The last Heinlein novel published in his life was To Sail Beyond the Sunset, which included and drew its title from this quote.

=== To real people ===
- Several characters appear to be Tuckerizations of science fiction and fantasy authors, including George R.R. Martin. The colony's Governor-General, Lawrence Cott, is clearly a reference to Larry Niven (whose full name is Laurence van Cott Niven), and Cott's lifemate, Perry Jarnell, is equally clearly a play on Niven's frequent collaborator, Jerry Pournelle.
- The quotes that begin chapters seventeen and eighteen are attributed to "Anson McDonald", on the occasion of "Anson McDonald Day". Anson McDonald is one of Heinlein's pseudonyms, and the afterword states that these quotes are actually Robert Heinlein's, delivered on Robert Heinlein Day.
- The works of the artist Alex Grey and various jazz musicians, notably the saxophonists Stan Getz and Colin MacDonald, are discussed in the novel.
- The ship is named after the late science fiction author Charles Sheffield.
