= Night of Power (novel) =

1985 novel by Spider Robinson

- Night of Power cover, Baen hardcover first edition
- Author: Spider Robinson
- Cover artist: David Willson
- Language: English
- Genre: Science fiction
- Publisher: Baen Books
- Publication date: 1985
- Publication place: United States
- Media type: Print (hardcover)
- Pages: 287 pp
- ISBN: 0-671-55944-3 (first edition hardback) ISBN 978-0-671-55944-1
- OCLC: 11496630
- Dewey Decimal: 813/.54 19
- LC Class: PS3568.O3156 N5 1985

Night of Power is a novel by Spider Robinson. It was first published by Baen Books in 1985. It is a speculative fiction tale about a race war that could have happened in New York. The novel is set in the year 1996, revolving around an interracial family that has to deal with a black revolution in New York.

The title alludes to the Islamic holy day of Laylat al-Qadr, which is sometimes translated as "Night of Power".

== Characters ==
Russell Grant is a 48-year-old designer who has made enough money from his unconventional inventions to retire early.

Jennifer is his 14-year-old daughter by his first marriage. She's characterized by the author as "a prodigiously bright and imaginative child."

Dena Grant is Russell's wife. She was born and raised in Halifax. She is a 37-year-old modern dancer coming to New York because "her old friend Lisa Dann has offered her a chance—one last chance—to dance in New York, and not just in New York but at the Joyce Theatre, the showcase, the worldwide Mecca of Modern dance."

Michael is a charismatic black man who is leading the revolution that the Grants find themselves caught up in.

José is the superintendent of Grant's apartment as well as being hired by Russell as a bodyguard for Jennifer. He is "a short dark handsome seventeen-year-old Puerto Rican with long unruly curls and an air of cynical amusement."

== Sources, references, external links, quotations ==
- Author's site
- Publisher's site
