= Antinomy (novel) =

1980 anthology by Spider Robinson

Antinomy is a collection by Spider Robinson published in 1980.

== Plot summary ==
Antinomy is a collection of science fiction short stories, songs, and puns.

== Stories ==
- "Antimony"
- "Half an Oaf"
- "Too Soon We Grow Old"
- "When No Man Pursueth"
- "Nobody Likes to Be Lonely"
- "Satan's Children"
- "Apogee"
- "No Renewal"
- "Overdose"
- "Tin Ear"
- "The Magnificent Conspiracy"

== Reception ==
Greg Costikyan reviewed Antinomy in Ares Magazine #6 and commented that "Anyone who likes science fiction cannot fail, I think, to enjoy Robinson's work."

== Reviews ==
- Review by Andrew Andrews (1981) in Science Fiction Review, Summer 1981
