= Very Bad Deaths =

2004 novel by Spider Robinson

- Author: Spider Robinson
- Language: English
- Genre: Science fiction, Speculative fiction novel
- Publisher: Baen Books
- Publication date: 2004
- Publication place: United States
- Media type: Print (hardback & paperback)
- ISBN: 0-7434-8861-X
- OCLC: 56012338
- Dewey Decimal: 813/.54 22
- LC Class: PS3568.O3156 V47 2004
- Followed by: Very Hard Choices

Very Bad Deaths (Baen Books, 2004, ISBN 0-7434-8861-X), is a science-fiction/suspense-mystery novel from Canadian science fiction author Spider Robinson. The book was followed in 2008 by a sequel, Very Hard Choices. It explores the personal implications of uncontrolled telepathy, social responsibility, and the idea of evolutionary, biological evil, while expounding on Spider's own political and social views.

== Summary ==
Very Bad Deaths is a collection of interrelated and interwoven short stories, each telling part of a longer narrative in discrete slices of time.

Zandor "Smelly" Zudenigo is a telepath and hermit living on an island off Vancouver, British Columbia, Canada. Incapable of turning his telepathy off, Zandor finds exposure to other minds is excruciatingly painful. When a serial killer flies over the island while thinking about his next planned multiple-murder, Zandor learns the details of the incredible depravity and cruelty of the killer's future homicide.

Zandor turns to an old acquaintance, the book's narrator, Russell Walker: a depressed, reclusive, national newspaper columnist trying to deal with the death of his wife, and teetering on the edge of suicide. The two of them attempt to find a way to stop the crime from occurring, but having no evidence besides what Zandor knows the killer was thinking at the time, they know they are not likely to be believed by the authorities; and, if they are believed, they are unsure how long they would be able to keep Zandor out of the clutches of intelligence agencies.

Finally able to convince a single member of the Vancouver Police Department, constable Nika Mandic, the three of them try to track down the mysterious "Allen", while wrestling with the practical and moral implications of what to do once they find him.

== Sequel ==
The sequel to this book, Very Hard Choices, was released in 2008. The author read excerpts from this book in his "Spider on the Web" podcast.
