= Chapel of Sacred Mirrors =

Church in Manhattan, New York

Coordinates: 41.580°N 73.936°W

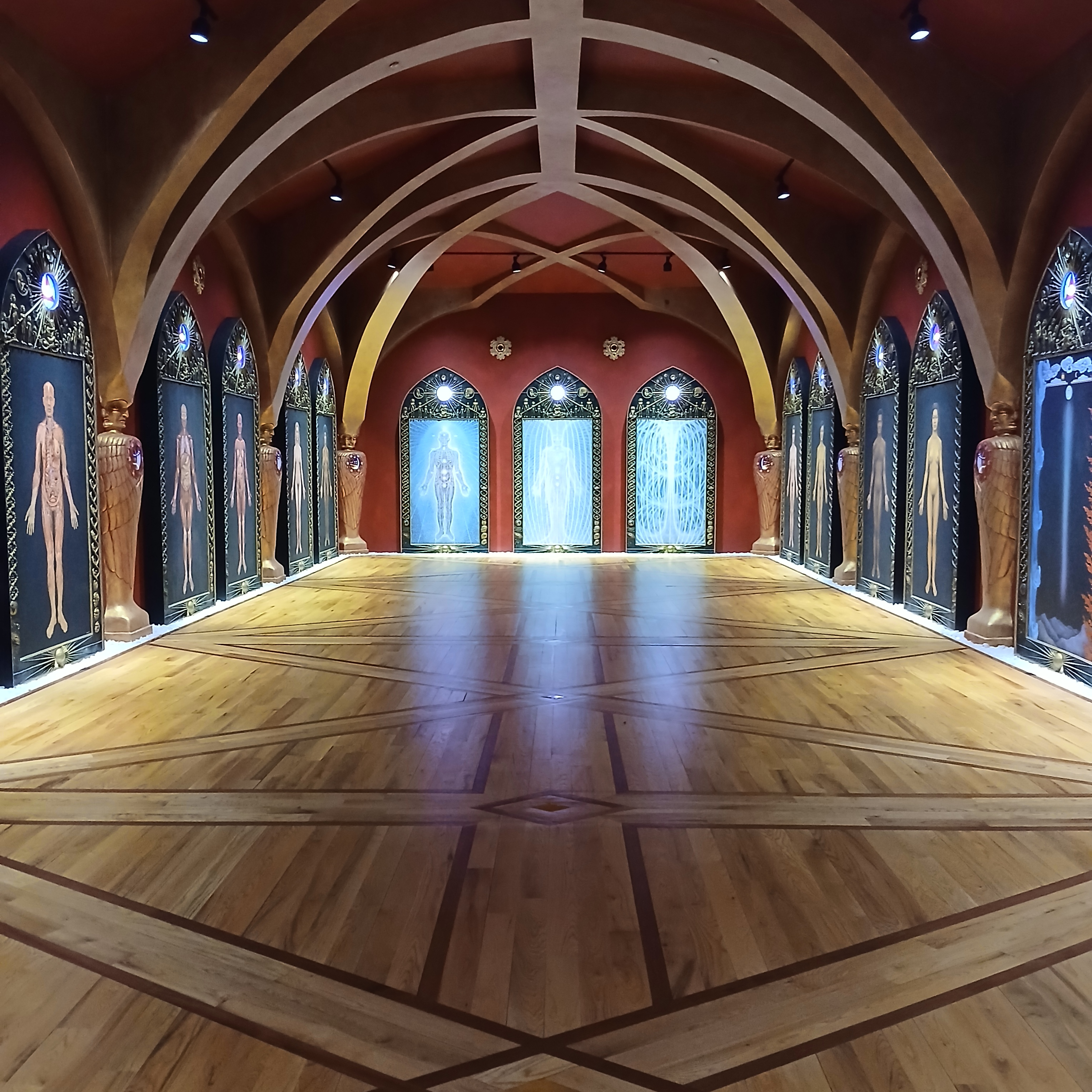
The Chapel of the Sacred Mirrors in Wappinger, New York in 2025.

The Chapel of Sacred Mirrors (CoSM) is a transdenominational church and nonprofit organization dedicated to the realization of a shared 1985 vision of the American artists Alex and Allyson Grey to build a contemporary public chapel as "a sanctuary for spiritual renewal through contemplation of transformative art".

It was conceived as an art gallery to house Alex Grey's Sacred Mirrors, a series of 21 artworks in which Grey examines the human body, symbolic spirit, and aspects of the human mind.

== History and description ==
The 21 painting Sacred Mirrors series was created over a ten-year period between 1979 and 1988. The series was originally inspired by a lysergic acid diethylamide (LSD) vision that Alex and Allyson Grey shared in 1976, during which they both claimed to experience the interconnectedness of all beings and things in the form of a "toroidal fountain and drain of self-illuminating love energy, a cellular node or jewel in a network that linked omnidirectionally without end". Alex later named what he experienced "the Universal Mind Lattice", and Allyson Grey's painting Jewel Net of Indra was similarly inspired by this shared visionary experience.

The style art is called visionary art, which Grey defines as "the creative expression of glimpses into the sacred unconsciousness" and stated that its purpose is to portray "the mystical experience of spiritual illumination, unity, wisdom, and love". Claiming a lineage that includes the ancient shamanic cave-painters, the 12th century Abbess Hildegard of Bingen, Hieronymus Bosch, and the English mystical painter and writer, William Blake, contemporary visionary art is also characterized by the belief that along with traditional methodologies such as fasting, meditation, yogic exercises, breath work, and prayer, "vision drugs" such as LSD, psilocybin, mescaline, cannabis, and dimethyltryptamine (DMT), can also be utilized as tools by artists seeking mystical visions.

The Sacred Mirrors series has been exhibited internationally, and is the subject of the 1990 book Sacred Mirrors: The Visionary Art of Alex Grey.

Works by painters such as Pablo Amaringo, Alex and Allyson Grey, Ernst Fuchs, and Robert Venosa, who all openly admit the direct influence of consciousness-altering compounds upon their art, have previously been loosely categorized under the category of "psychedelic art". By consciously advocating these compounds as "entheogens" (generating-God-within), or plants and drugs that invoke a sense of the numinous or a mystical experience, as opposed to mere "psychedelics", visionary art claims a sacred and profound nature for these compounds.

The inspiration by the Greys to build a Chapel in 1985 is also credited to a shared drug experience, this time while using the empathogen MDMA.

Dedicated to fostering interfaith and post-denominational spiritual understanding, the Greys envision the Chapel of Sacred Mirrors as "a new type of sacred space with both a personal and a planetary perspective … a Chapel of transformative art that aligns the individual self: body, mind, and spirit, through contemplation of the Sacred Mirrors … by peeling away our accumulated layers of separateness, showing we are all made of the same miraculous blood, guts, and cosmic dust."

=== Foundation, 1996–2003 ===
The Foundation for the Chapel of Sacred Mirrors Ltd. was formed in 1996 as a nonprofit charity to raise awareness and funds for the creation of the Chapel. Advisory board members have included Deepak Chopra, Ken Wilber, Mathew Fox, and Marcia Tucker. In 2003, upon the suggestion of shaman Alex Stark, Alex and Allyson Grey began holding full moon prayer ceremonies in their Brooklyn home to facilitate the construction of the chapel. Due to noise complaints by neighbors, the Greys' home became unsuitable.

=== Chapel of Sacred Mirrors, New York City: 2004–2009 ===
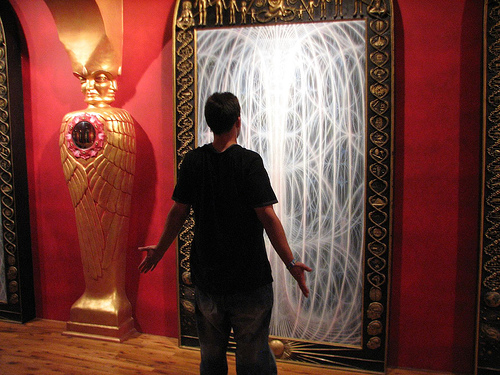
An Alex Grey artwork viewed in 2007

Supported by the community that formed around these gatherings, the first Chapel of Sacred Mirrors opened in a donated space in Chelsea in the heart of NYC's gallery and nightclub district on the autumnal equinox of 2004.

Along with the Sacred Mirrors series, the original chapel displayed a number of Alex Grey's major works (many of which had been repurchased from collectors for the foundation) including Theologue, Net of Being, Cosmic Christ, and Journey of the Wounded Healer, as well as Allyson Grey's Secret Language paintings and occasional exhibitions of fellow artists. Monthly celebrations held on the New and Full moons, and workshops by notable leaders in the fields or art, science, and religion, established the Chapel as a "mecca" of the New York New Age community. Alex Grey's artwork on album covers and stage shows of the rock group Tool, album artwork for The Beastie Boys and Nirvana, and a major installation at the 2006 Burning Man festival increased his notability in the New Age counterculture. The NYC Chapel of Sacred Mirrors also featured workshops on painting, sacred geometry, and sacred architecture, and a series of popular "Entheogenic Salons" that included live painting by Alex and Allyson Grey and other performances.

The Greys did not intend the original Chapel of Sacred Mirrors in New York City to be a permanent site, although its popularity amongst the New York 'New Age' community allowed it to survive longer than initially conceived. It operated from the autumnal equinox of 2004 until January 1, 2009. When the New York City location closed the Greys started the fundraising phase. They have discussed their art at a variety of events ranging from local health and wellness festivals to international symposiums on psychedelic research such as the World Psychedelic Forum, MAPS' psychedelic science events, and the transpersonal experience (ITA). In 2013 Alex Grey spoke at TedX in Hawaii.

=== Chapel of Sacred Mirrors, Wappinger, New York; 2009–present ===
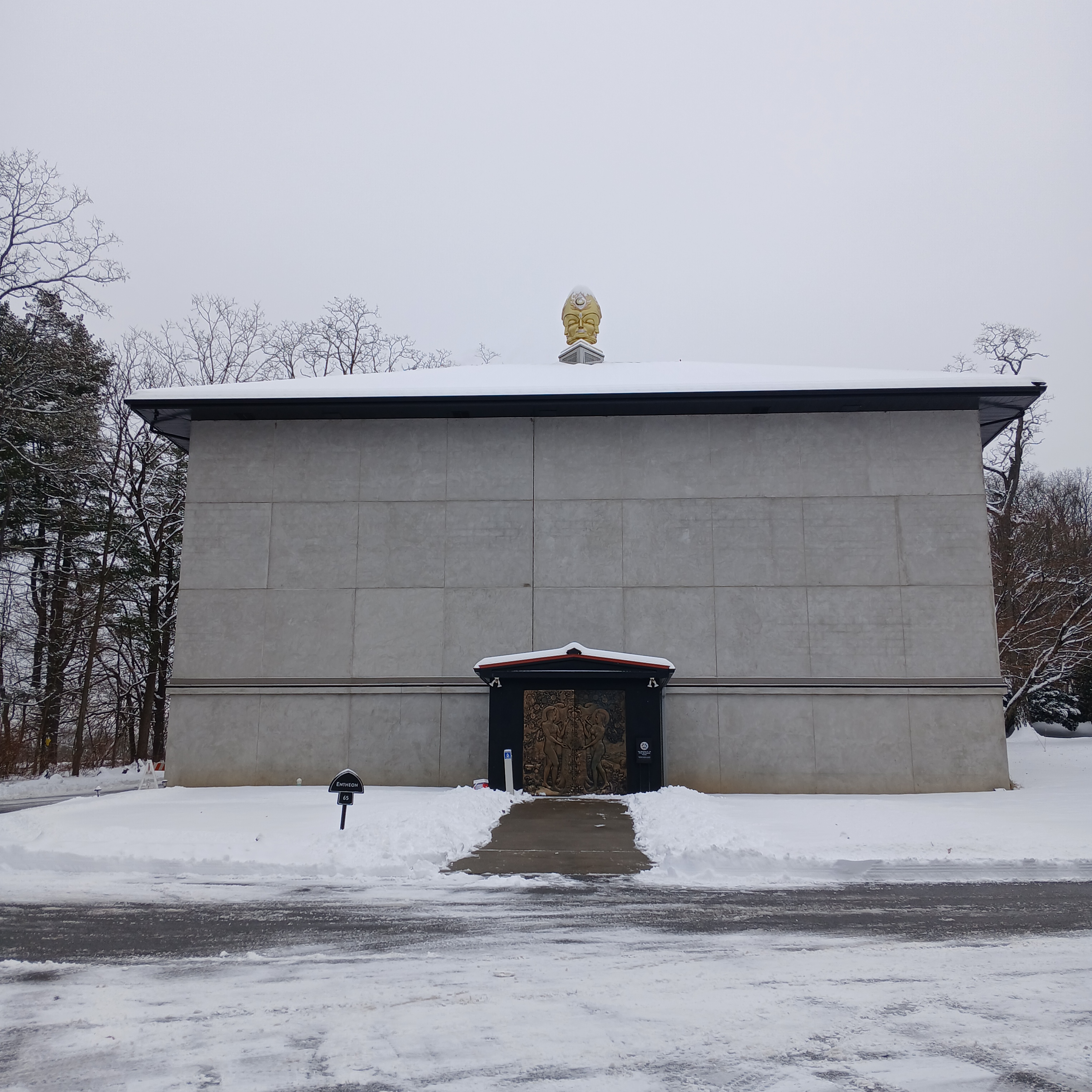
The Entheon in Wappinger, New York in 2025.

On September 12, 2008, after a lengthy search for a permanent site, the Foundation for the Chapel of Sacred Mirrors purchased a forty-acre former interfaith center on the Hudson River 65 miles north of New York City in the Wheeler Hill Historic District in Wappinger, New York. In November 2008, the organization became a 501(c)(3). According to Candid, the "organization is not required to file an annual return with the IRS because it is a church."

Alex and Allyson Grey live on the grounds, which also house a 10,000-square-foot guesthouse with cafe and gift-shop. The Greys' full moon ceremonies have continued uninterrupted at this new location, along with special events, permaculture courses, and workshops that have attracted guest presenters such as folk-musician and eco-activist Pete Seeger and tree-sitter and eco-artist Julia Butterfly Hill. The Greys' intention in opening the Chapel of Sacred Mirrors was to represent all visionary and contemporary sacred art, and visiting artists are encouraged to create murals, labyrinths, gardens, and sculptures. These include Kate Raudenbush's Altered State, a two-story domed steel structure first seen at Burning Man in 2008 that now resides in a meadow on the CoSM grounds.

A three story temple called the Entheon was built in Wappinger, costing $2.8 million, and opened in 2023.
