= Melancholy Elephants =

1982 short story by Spider Robinson

"Melancholy Elephants" is a 1982 science fiction short story by Canadian writer Spider Robinson. The story examines the interaction of copyright and longevity, and the possible effects of the extension of copyright to perpetuity. Its title is a reference to the popular belief that elephants are incapable of forgetting.

== Premise ==
The story is set in a future in which powerful entities seek to pass a bill to enact perpetual copyright. A woman named Dorothy Martin believes this to be a threat to civilization and seeks to bribe a powerful senator into killing the proposal.

== Reception ==
"Melancholy Elephants" won the 1983 Hugo Award for Best Short Story.

The story has been cited by various legal scholars in analyses of copyright, including Wendy J. Gordon, who observed that "the story does not specify why [within the story] copyright is denied in unconsciously derivative works", and noted that it "may erroneously be supposing that novelty (...) rather than originality is the relevant standard for protectability in copyright" (while emphasizing that this "does not undermine the theme's basic validity"), and Robert Spoo. Ezra Klein has stated that he has "always [been] struck" by the story's basic idea, and that it has "really burrowed deep in [him]".
