= New Hamburg, New York =

Hamlet in New York, United States

- Hamlet and census-designated place
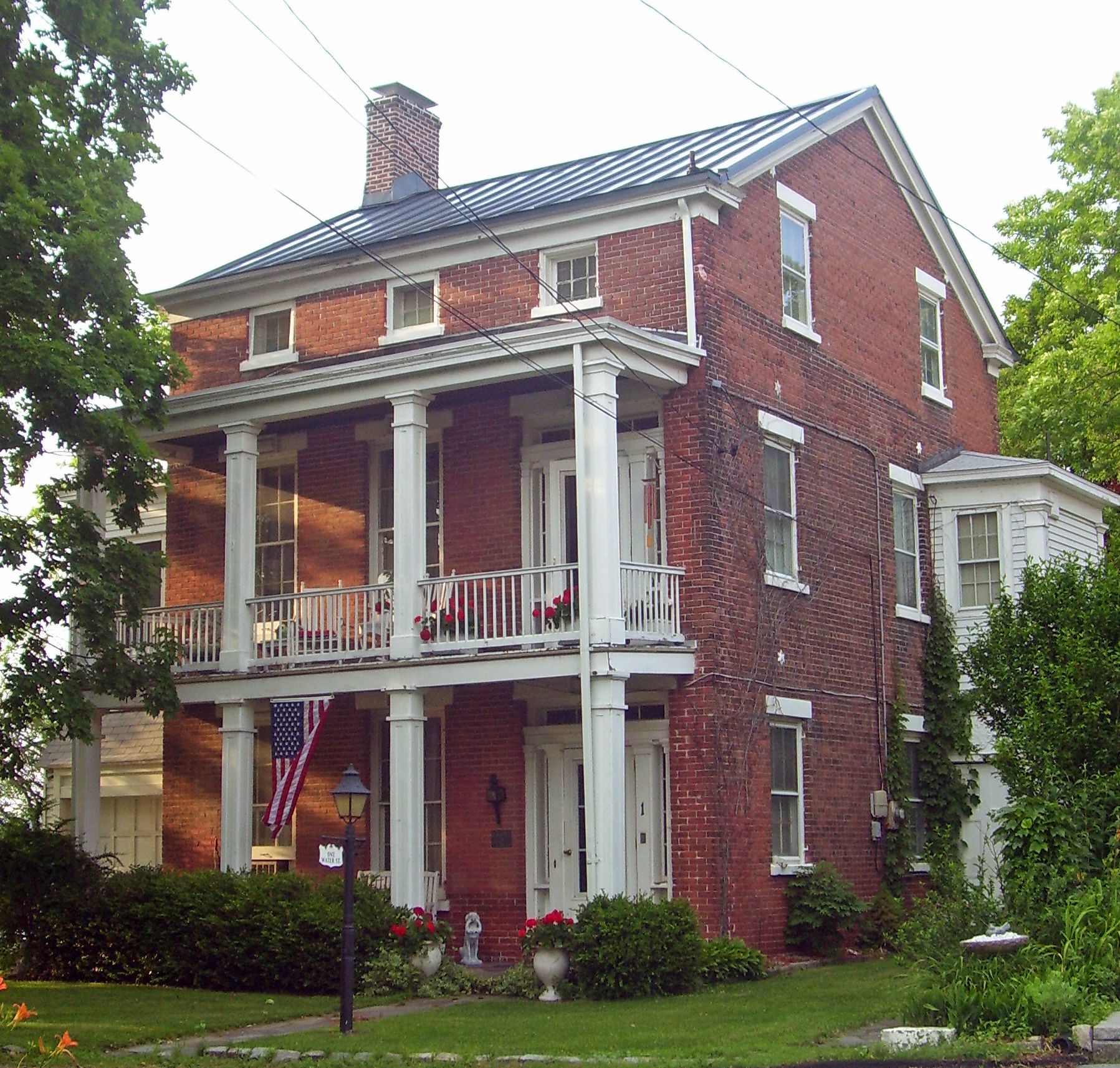
- Adolph Brower House, built c. 1844, in New Hamburg, New York
- Interactive map of New Hamburg, New York
- Coordinates: 41°35′18″N 73°56′43″W
- Country: United States
- State: New York
- County: Dutchess
- Town: Poughkeepsie
- Time zone: UTC-5 (Eastern (EST))
  - Summer (DST): UTC-4 (EDT)
- ZIP code: 12590 (Wappingers Falls)
- GNIS feature ID: 958415

New Hamburg is a small hamlet (and census-designated place) along the Hudson River in Dutchess County, New York, United States. It is located in the southern corner of the Town of Poughkeepsie.

As of the 2020 census, New Hamburg had a population of 842.

== History ==
Road records of 1770 show that there were shipping facilities in New Hamburg called "Hood Landing". Rivermen called the rocky point of land in the angle between the Hudson and the mouth of Wappinger Creek "High Point" and the area which projected into the river a few miles south "Low Point" (Chelsea).

Lime burning became an important industry. Dr. Benjamin Ely's map of 1797 shows a lime kiln in New Hamburg. By 1800, Ephraim DuBois had settled at High Point. In 1837 he sold his property, including a lime quarry and kiln, to Adolph Brower from New York. Brower's customers were local pig iron producers and farmers and builders as far away as New Jersey, supplied by river boat. He tore down the DuBois house and built his own on the same site circa 1844. New Hamburg Yacht Club is now situated approximately where the "Old Lime Dock" was. The riverfront near the lime kilns was a favorite local bathing area called the "Sandy Bottom Shore.” When the railroad was built in the late 1840s, excess stone was tossed onto the naturally sandy beach area.

In 1808, John Drake Jr. built a bridge across Wappingers Creek. In 1879, an iron swing-bridge was erected, and continued to be known as "Drake's Bridge".

By 1810, John Drake had relocated to the hamlet where he had docks, a store, and 30 acres of land at High Point, then known as "Wappingers Landing". In the early 1820s, lumber surpassed lime kilns as a business. Charles Millard, who owned a lumber business based in Ulster County, moved to the Landing in 1824 and opened a lumber yard. Since most of the lumber and log shipments were made by water, Millard's son, Walter, branched out into ship building and freighting. He and a partner, Uriah Mills, built the barge Lexington, which carried freight up and down the Hudson River and the steamer Splendid, which carried both freight and passengers. New Hamburg became a port community on the river, with ships loaded and unloaded along nearby Point Street and then taken to Poughkeepsie and Wappingers Falls via road. In 1837, the postmaster was Walter Millard.

In 1848, construction began on the Hudson River Railroad in order to expand the Troy and Greenbush Railroad from the Albany area to New York City. In 1848–1849, a cholera epidemic swept through the community of railroad workers. It is recorded that Father J. Scollon, of St. Mary's in nearby Channingville, being called to High Point, labored unceasingly to relieve the sick and the dying. The outbreak caused a number of fatalities among the workers, and construction was delayed. An 800-foot (240 m) tunnel was built through a hillside north of town, and the work being done there triggered the development of Main Street as a commercial area.

The river steamer Mary Powell used to stop at New Hamburg in the morning on her way to New York and in the afternoon on the return trip.

Around 1860, William Shay operated a rag business on the corner of Main Street and Point Street. He would travel up Wappingers Creek to the mills in Wappingers Falls, and obtain rags and cotton waste for transshipment. The hamlet suffered a devastating fire on May 3, 1877, involving the loss of seven buildings.

The New Hamburg Yacht Club was originally incorporated in 1869 as an ice boat club. In February 1871, on the railroad drawbridge over the Wappinger Creek along the Hudson between the towns of Poughkeepsie and Wappinger, a train traveling north collided with an oil tank train car heading south. The trains exploded upon impact instantly throwing people, luggage, and train parts into the water. Seventy-seven people were missing or unidentified. The number of confirmed deaths was 22. Some bodies were taken to Poughkeepsie for identification; many were never recovered.

The area around New Hamburg was the location of a number of country estates such as that of New York City attorney, Francis Robert Rives, which was located on Rives Avenue, as well as that of J. Fisher Sheefe.

In 1925, the Augustinian Friars of Villanova purchased the Untermeyer estate on Wheeler Hill for the Novitiate of Our Mother of the Good Counsel. The property was sold in 1980. It has since become the site of a town park.

In 1929, the Children's Aid Society of New York operated a farm school for older boys, at Bowdoin Farm in New Hamburg, New York, to train boys in farm work and give them a taste of what to expect, before placing them as paid laborers on farms in the country.

== Geography ==
New Hamburg sits 69 feet (21 m) above sea level and sits in the Eastern Time Zone.

== Services ==
The New Hamburg station is on the Metro-North Railroad's Hudson Line

The New Hamburg Fire Department provides Fire and Emergency Medical Service response for the entire hamlet of New Hamburg.

New Hamburg Park, on Main Street, is under the jurisdiction of the Town of Poughkeepsie Recreation Dept. It contains tennis courts, a basketball court, a playground, a baseball field and part of the Wappinger Greenway Trail. It adjoins the Reese Audubon Sanctuary.
