= Starseed (novel) =

1991 novel by Spider Robinson and Jeanne Robinson

- First standalone edition
- Author: Spider Robinson and Jeanne Robinson
- Cover artist: Michael Herring
- Language: English
- Series: Stardance Trilogy
- Genre: SF
- Publisher: Ace Books
- Publication date: 1991
- Publication place: USA
- Pages: 247
- ISBN: 0-441-78357-0
- Preceded by: Stardance
- Followed by: Starmind

Starseed is a science fiction novel by Spider Robinson and Jeanne Robinson. It first appeared in seven parts in Pulphouse Weekly in 1991. It is a sequel to Stardance and was published as a standalone novel later that year. It was republished in 1997 as an omnibus edition with Stardance.
