= Starseed (band) =

South-African/British rock band

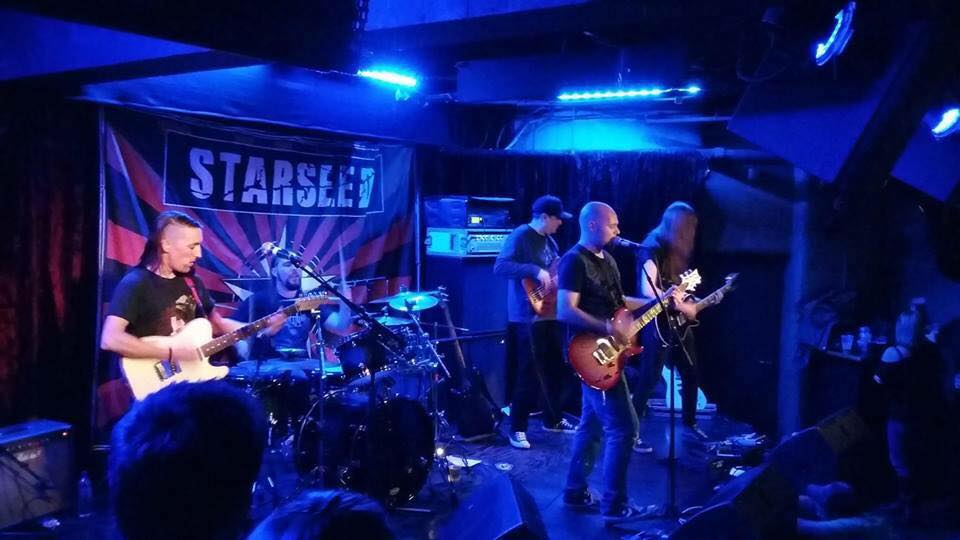
- Starseed performing at the Borderline in London in October 2015

Background information
- Origin: Johannesburg, Gauteng, South Africa
- Genres: Grunge; Hard rock (recently)
- Years active: 2000–present
- Members: Russell Spence; Gerald Gill; Peter Wicker; Andrew Spence; Darren Carikas
- Past members: Dale Anderson; Justin Hart; Shaun Evans; Aidan Starr Coetzee; Murray McChlery
- Website: Official MySpace; Starseed

Starseed is a melodic hard rock band originally from Johannesburg, South Africa, now based in London, England formed in 2000. Starseed's latest release "Peace Machine" has seen a significant rise in the band's UK popularity with the album receiving rave reviews and acclaim from the UK music industry from Kerrang Magazine to XFM.

Starseed had a successful 2010 playing an XFM Live Session in Feb 2010 as well as playing Download Festival 2010, Maesteg Metal Festival and Hard Rock Hell IV.

Starseed also supported Senser on their O2 Academy tour in June 2010.

2011 has seen the band share the stage with Senser once again on a national tour, support Ill Nino at Kick Out The Jams Festival 2011 and have been confirmed to play the Pepsi Max stage on Sunday 12 June at Download Festival 2011.

The band will be releasing a second single from Peace Machine, "See Through Your Lies" on 6 June 2011 via digital release, followed by national and European tour dates.

Since 2009 drummer, "Animal Andy" has worked at the internet rock and metal station, TotalRock, as a stand in DJ.

== USA release of Peace Machine ==
Peace Machine was released in the United States in Feb 2012. With singles "Shine" and "See Through Your Lies" released running up to the album release. "Shine" was released on iTunes and all major digital outlets on 6 December: Shine - Single by Starseed on Apple Music

== Hiatus ==
On 2 May 2012, the band announced via their Facebook page that they were taken an indefinite break:

"It’s with heavy hearts and our deepest regrets that we announce we will be cancelling all future dates for the foreseeable future and the band will be taking an indefinite break starting immediately. The band has made this decision as we work through personal and family related issues that must come first in our lives. Our sincerest apologies to those of you looking forward to seeing us this weekend and at our other shows throughout the year. We’re gutted we can’t be there with you. We pray you will all understand and support us in what has been an incredibly hard decision to make, but a very necessary one all the same.

We love each and every one of you for your amazing support over the years and hope one day we can do this again for you all.

Much peace, love and respect…

Andy, Russ, Gman, Murray and Pete"

== Reunion and UK Tour ==
Starseed briefly reformed in Oct 2015 to play a special show for the "Rooting For Rhino" charity at The Borderline in London. The show saw the inclusion of bassist Darren Carikas (also of Temples On Mars and The Spindle Sect). Dale Anderson also reunited with the band for the songs "Shine" and "Return" on the night.

On Friday, 22 May 2020, Starseed announced they were again reforming to go on a UK tour with the late Phil Lynott's newly reformed Grand Slam in December 2020.

== Other projects ==
Andrew Spence worked with the Rock/Crossover band The Spindle Sect, having recorded drums for their album Bubonic Tronic released in April 2012. He also had brief stints in UK bands Agent (now Temples on Mars) and IAmI (fronted by ZP Theart).

Gerald Gill and Darren Carikas are both members of UK Prog Rock outfit Temples On Mars.

Murray McChlery fronted London based funk outfit Soul Trigger.

== Band members ==
- Russell Spence – vocals, guitar
- Gerald Gill – guitar, backing vocals
- Peter Wicker – guitar
- Andrew Spence – drums, backing vocals
- Darren Carikas – bass

=== Former members ===
- Murray McChlery – bass, backing vocals (2010–2012)
- Dale Anderson – bass, backing vocals (2005–2010)
- Aidan Starr Coetzee – bass (2004–2005)
- Justin Hart – bass (2000–2003)
- Shaun Evans – guitar, vocals (2000–2003)

== Discography ==
=== Albums ===
- All The Things They Can't Take Away... (2005)
- Love's War (EP) (2008)
- Peace Machine UK (2009) USA (2012)

== Singles ==
- Shine (taken from the album "Peace Machine") – Released 6 December (USA)
- See Through Your Lies – Due for release Jan 2012 (USA)

=== Videography ===
- Shine
- See Through Your Lies
