= Very Hard Choices =

2008 novel by Spider Robinson

- First jacket
- Author: Spider Robinson
- Language: English
- Genre: Science fiction, Speculative fiction novel
- Publisher: Baen Books
- Publication date: June 3, 2008
- Publication place: United States
- Media type: Print
- Pages: 224
- ISBN: 1-4165-5556-0
- OCLC: 191727410
- Dewey Decimal: 813/.54 22
- LC Class: PS3568.O3156 V48 2008
- Preceded by: Very Bad Deaths

Very Hard Choices is a science-fiction/suspense-mystery novel from Canadian science fiction author Spider Robinson, released in June 2008. The novel, set in British Columbia, is a sequel to Very Bad Deaths and continues the story of the reclusive telepath known as Smelly.

== Plot ==
In this novel, Nika and Russell discover that protecting the secret of Smelly's telepathic abilities has brought them into conflict with the Central Intelligence Agency, who has been pursuing him since his escape from the MKUltra Project in the 1960s.

== Characters ==
- Zandor "Smelly" Zudenigo, recluse and telepath
- Russell Walker, newspaper columnist
- Jesse, Russell's son, an American public relations executive
- Constable Nika Mandiç of the Vancouver Police Department

== Critical reception ==
David Gerrold has said "Spider Robinson is at his best when he is most passionate – and this is Spider Robinson at his very best. If you're expecting a nice polite distraction that you can put down and forget, you're going to be very annoyed. This isn't a story, it's a wake-up call. And it isn't over until you decide it's over."
