= The Spindle Sect =

Alternative metal band

- Origin: Cape Town, Western Cape, South Africa
- Genres: Alternative metal, nu metal, rap metal, alternative hip hop
- Members: Garreth Carikas; Darren Carikas; Snake Pliskin; Taron Cassab; Andy Czaplewski; Jerry Sadowski
- Past members: Inge Beckmann; Julian Blaauw
- Website: TheSpindleSect.com

The Spindle Sect is an alternative metal band originally from Cape Town, South Africa, now based in the United Kingdom. They combine alternative metal, hip hop and various heavy subgenres, such as metalcore and hardcore punk, with elements of various electronic bass music genres, such as breakbeat, big beat, electronica, trance, industrial, drum and bass and dubstep.

The band played a key role in the revival of the live music scene in Cape Town circa 2002, drawing sell out crowds to their debut shows and often cited as "ahead of their time".

After the band's relocation to the UK, they quickly earned themselves a spot on the Feedme Music roster alongside One Minute Silence, Senser, The Algorithm and Starseed. This led to the band supporting Ill Niño and Breed 77 at Kick Out The Jams Festival, two national tours with Hed PE and Senser, respectively, and a slot at Guernsey Festival alongside Hadouken. The band has since been playlisted on national radio with XFM, Kerrang!, and TotalRock Radio (Bloodstock Radio).

2012 saw the release of the band's debut album Bubonic Tronic, which was mixed in L.A. by Dave Schiffman and mastered by Howie Weinberg.

== Band members ==
- Darren Carikas – bass, programming, synthesizer
- Garreth Carikas – lead vocals, programming, synthesizer
- Jerry Sudowski – drums
- Andy Czaplewski – guitars

== Discography ==
- "Episode One" (2004)
- Is Your Planet Safe? (2009)
- "Escape Route" (2012)
- Bubonic Tronic (2012)
- The Fractured EP (2012)
- NXTGENSS EP (2014)
