= Starmind (novel) =

1995 novel by Spider Robinson and Jeanne Robinson

- First book edition
- Author: Spider Robinson and Jeanne Robinson
- Cover artist: Michael Herring
- Language: English
- Series: Stardance Trilogy
- Genre: Science fiction
- Publisher: Ace Books
- Publication date: 1995
- Publication place: USA
- Pages: 292
- ISBN: 0-441-00209-9
- Preceded by: Starseed

Starmind is a science fiction novel by American writers Spider Robinson and Jeanne Robinson. It first appeared as a four-part serial in Analog Science Fiction and Fact in 1994, and in book form the following year.
