= Mindkiller =

1982 novel by Spider Robinson

- First edition
- Author: Spider Robinson
- Cover artist: Paul Bacon
- Language: English
- Genre: Science fiction
- Publisher: Holt, Rinehart and Winston
- Publication place: United States
- Media type: Print
- Pages: 278
- ISBN: 0-03-059018-3

Mindkiller is a 1982 science fiction novel by American writer Spider Robinson. The novel, set in the late 1980s (re-edited later to begin in 2006), explores the social implications of technologies to manipulate the brain, beginning with wireheading, the use of electric current to stimulate the pleasure center of the brain in order to achieve a narcotic high.

== Overview ==
The novel follows three central characters: Karen Scholz, a young woman who has attempted suicide by permanent wireheading, the constant use of which overrides desires for food and drink; Norman Kent, a college professor, whose life is turned into a quest when his sister is abducted by a powerful authority; and Joe Templeton, a high-tech burglar, who has lost his memory after an accident during wartime.

The novel incorporates as its second chapter a slightly modified version of his short story "God Is an Iron" (first published in the May 1979 issue of Omni), a social commentary on the nature of addiction and addictive personalities built on wireheading.

The novel is unusual in its use of point of view, in a fashion similar to that of Robinson's mentor Robert A. Heinlein's novel The Number of the Beast.

== Sequel stories ==
An independent sequel, Time Pressure, is set in 1974 and concerns the later discovery of a method of limited time travel by the protagonists of Mindkiller, though this connection may not be obvious to the casual reader until late in the novel. Baen Books has published these two novels, along with a third book in the series, Lifehouse, as an omnibus volume under the title The Lifehouse Trilogy.

== Reception ==
Dave Langford reviewed Mindkiller for White Dwarf #71, and stated that "One can't help suspecting that this over-intensity is meant to distract you from the dodgy coincidences and out-of character behaviour required to drive the plot ... not so much Spider as Heath Robinson."

== Reviews ==
- Review by Debbie Notkin (1982) in Locus, #261 October 1982
- Review by Gene DeWeese (1983) in Science Fiction Review, Spring 1983
- Review by Tom Easton (1983) in Analog Science Fiction/Science Fact, April 1983
- Review by Garth Spencer (1983) in Science Fiction Review, Fall 1983
- Review by Frank Catalano (1983) in Amazing Science Fiction, September 1983
- Review by Steve Brown (1983) in Thrust, #19, Winter/Spring 1983
- Review by Paul Brazier (1984) in Vector 121
- Review by K. V. Bailey (1985) in Paperback Inferno, #57
