= Wheeler Hill Historic District =

Historic district in New York, United States

- U.S. National Register of Historic Places
- U.S. Historic district
- Location within New York Location within the United States
- Location: Wheeler Hill Rd., Wappinger, New York
- Coordinates: 41°34′36″N 73°56′37″W
- Area: 320 acres (130 ha)
- Architect: Post, George B.; Downing, Andrew J
- Architectural style: Late 19th And 20th Century Revivals, Late Victorian, Federal, Italianate, Colonial
- NRHP reference No.: 91000678
- Added to NRHP: June 14, 1991

Wheeler Hill Historic District is a federally recognized historic district located at Wappinger in Dutchess County, New York. Along the eastern shore of the Hudson River, atop of the Van Wyck Ridge is the "estates region of the Town of Wappinger". A scenic location, with roads lined with stone walls, properties greeting guests with magnificent stone pillars and iron gates, it includes 49 contributing buildings, 15 contributing sites, and four contributing structures. It encompasses the estates of Obercreek, Elmhurst, Edge Hill, Henry Suydam, William Crosby, and Carnwath that were developed between 1740 and 1940. Also included are two 18th-century riverfront commercial structures, the Lent / Waldron Store and Stone House at Farmer's Landing. It was added to the National Register of Historic Places in 1991. Today the historic district is mostly made up of residential houses, but Carnwath and Obercreek are opened to the public.

== Edge Hill ==
Edgehill is one of the first properties developed as a country estate. In 1846 Henry Suydam purchased a farmhouse and a parcel of surrounding land from Job Angel for a country estate. The brother of artist James Augustus Suydam, Henry Suydam was descended from an old New York merchant family. His parents were Jane (née Mesier) Suydam and John Suydam, who was considered "one of the old Knickerbocker merchants" and was head of Suydam & Wycoff. Henry Suydam started a successful tea business before retiring some time in his 40s to turn to his private interests of writing and art. Henry Suydam was an artist in his own right, whose works are displayed at the National Academy of Design. In 1882 he privately published a book detailing the history of his mother's family, the Mesiers, combined with a history of the Zion Episcopal Church.

The original house was built in 1810. It was remodeled in the 1840s in the Greek Revival style then popular. The estate covered seventy-five acres. Henry Suydam's daughter Emily married Dr. Clarence Satterlee, brother of Rev.Henry Y. Satterlee, rector of Zion Episcopal Church in Wappingers Falls, The Satterlees lived at Edge Hill in the 1860s and 1870s. In 1871, Dr. Satterlee, who also had a residence on E20th St in New York City, was assistant surgeon for the NYS 84th Infantry Regiment. In 1891, Satterlee sold Edge Hill to William R. Sands, brother of Samuel Stevens Sands, and partner with him in S.S. Sands & Co. Samuel Sands had established the nearby Elmhurst estate some years earlier.

== Elmhurst ==
Samuel S. Sands built "Elmhurst" in 1865. Sands was a banker and broker in partnership with William Henry Reese and joined the New York Stock Exchange in 1854. He acted as broker for a number of important financial interests, including the Astors. Sands died at the age of sixty-six at his country estate, "Elmhurst", July 26, 1892. By the mid-1900s, the United Church of Christ operated a church on the property. Since no physical church building was ever constructed, they conducted services at an outdoor pulpit. The property formerly housed the Deer Hill Conference Center, and later The Chapel of Sacred Mirrors, an art sanctuary created by artists, Alex Grey and Allyson Grey.

== Carnwath ==
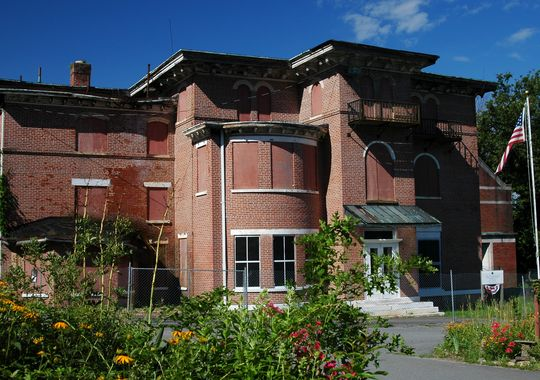
Carnwath Manor

Carnwath was originally built in 1850 for William and Lydia Willis, relatives of the Mesier family in nearby Wappingers Falls. The estate was named from a Manor home set in Scotland. Willis was a retired hardware merchant from New York City. He sold the Carnwath Manor and the rest of the 200 acre estate after the Civil War to General George Barclay and then built Obercreek. In 1870, General Barclay sold Carnwath to his son-in-law, Francis Robert Rives. Wheeler Hill Road was once known as Rives Avenue or hill.

Rives constructed the Carriage House in 1873 to hold some of the finest carriages and stable horses in the entire country. Later his son, Reginald, inherited the estate, he was elected supervisor of Wappinger in 1900. Around 1910 the property was sold to Isaac Untermyer, who was famous for defending William "Boss" Tweed. By the 1920s the Augustinians purchased the property and built the dormitory building and chapel in the mid-1950s. The property was purchased by the Town of Wappinger in 1999 as a park, with hopes to restore the Carnwath Manor, Carriage House, and other structures on the property. It is also home to the Sports Museum of Dutchess County which was dedicated in 2005 along with the Frances Reese Cultural Center (dormitory) by Hillary Clinton, and the soon to be the home of the Town of Wappinger Museum & Visitor Center. The Frances Reese Cultural Center and the Carnwath Chapel at this time are the only buildings on site that are open to the public, with the sports museum, a gift shop, small video viewing room, and snack bar. Friends of Carnwath maintains and holds events at the estate.

== Obercreek ==
Obercreek was built by William H. Willis in 1856 as their new home after they sold Carnwath just down the road. Since the Willis' were related to the Mesiers the estate was passed down to them and finally to the Reese family who presented plans for development of the property to the Town in 2007. Today a portion of the estate is open to the public every weekend with an organic market and for events associated with the newly restored Obercreek CSA.

== William Crosby Estate ==
In the mid-nineteenth century, the Crosby House was owned by G.C. Satterlee. The Satterlees were linked by marriage to the Suydam family, owners of the Suydam House. Located on the east side of Wheeler Hill Road, the former Crosby Estate is now the location of several private stone residences and the Tall Trees subdivision. It stood until the early 1900s until a fire burned it to the ground. According to several residents whose houses are located on the former Crosby Estate, a disgruntled servant was left in charge of the mansion while the family was away in Europe. He burned it down and pieces of the house and personal belongings can still be found on the site today.

== Farmers Landing ==
Shortly after Francis Rombout (the original grantee of the Rombout Patent) died, his partner Gulian Verplanck was given the northern portion of the patent. By 1750, his descendant, William Verplanck, was given a portion of the patent and constructed a stone homestead and mill in Fishkill Plains on the Sprout Creek. He also constructed a small stone structure on the Hudson River which was used to sell and ship out wheat and other crops to cities and consumers. This location later became known as Farmers Landing. The house is also known as being hit with a cannonball from a British Naval ship on its way to burn the City of Kingston. Today it is a private residence on Old Troy Road and can be seen from the MTA Hudson Line railroad

A few rods below the house are the remains of an old dock...Before the waterfront at New Hamburgh was improved it was the landing place for passengers and freight consigned to Wappingers Falls. In those days a prosperous freighting business was carried on by means of sloops which plied between here and New York carrying produce of the surrounding country while packets sloops conveyed passengers...The Clermont…also landed here on her regular trips from New York to Albany. …The advent of the Hudson River Railroad and larger and more commodious steamboats made it unprofitable to continue the business and it was abandoned as a freighting place.
