= Spider Robinson =

Canadian science fiction author (born 1948)

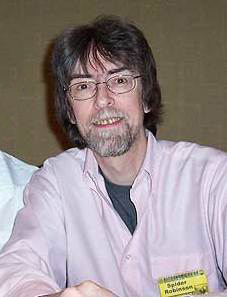
- Robinson at the 2004 Necronomicon
- Born: November 24, 1948 (age 77); New York City, U.S.
- Occupation: Author
- Spouse: Jeanne Robinson (m. 1975; died 2010)
- Children: 1
- Writing career
- Genre: Science fiction

Spider Robinson (born November 24, 1948) is an American-Canadian science fiction author. He has won a number of awards for his hard science fiction and humorous stories, including the Hugo Award 1977 and 1983, and another Hugo with his co-author and wife Jeanne Robinson in 1978.

== Early life and education ==
Robinson was born in the Bronx, New York City; his father was a salesman. He was an avid reader of science fiction, and it was his early childhood exposure to the juvenile novels of Robert A. Heinlein that later influenced him to become a writer. He attended a Catholic high school, spending his junior year in a seminary; this was followed by two years at Le Moyne College in Syracuse, New York, and five years at the State University of New York at Stony Brook in the 1960s, where he earned a Bachelor of Arts in English. While at Stony Brook, Spider entertained at campus coffeehouses and gatherings, strumming his guitar and singing in harmony with his female partner. It was at this time that his friends, at his request, stopped calling him his childhood nickname of "Robbie" (a simple contraction of his last name, Robinson) and gave him the nickname "Spider", which he eventually adopted as his official first name. Robinson adopted the name partially out of admiration for blues musician "Spider" John Koerner.

== Career ==
In 1971, just out of college, Robinson took a night job guarding sewers in New York City, and wanting a career change, began writing science fiction. He made his first short-story sale in 1972 to Analog Science Fiction magazine. The story, "The Guy with the Eyes" (Analog, February 1973), was set in a bar called Callahan's Place. Robinson would continue to write occasional stories about the denizens of Callahan's into the 21st century. The stories have been collected into a number of published books.

In 1973, Robinson moved to Nova Scotia and began writing full-time. He made several short-story sales to Analog, Galaxy Science Fiction magazine, and others, earning the John Campbell Award for best new writer in 1974.

In 1975, he married Jeanne Robinson, a choreographer, dancer, and Sōtō Zen monk, with whom he later co-wrote the Stardance Trilogy.

He worked as a book reviewer for Galaxy magazine during the mid-to-late 1970s. In 1978–79, he contributed book reviews to Jim Baen's original anthology series Destinies. For several years after he reviewed books for Analog, including reviews of Heinlein's later work.

Robinson's first published novel, Telempath (1976), was an expansion of his Hugo Award–winning novella By Any Other Name. Over the following three decades, Robinson on average released a book a year, including short story anthologies.

In 1977, Robinson released Callahan's Crosstime Saloon, a collection of short stories in his long-running Callahan's series. These stories, and later novels, make frequent reference to the works of mystery writer John D. MacDonald; his character Lady Sally McGee reflects Travis McGee, the central character in MacDonald's mystery novels. The lead character in Lady Slings the Booze frequently refers to Travis McGee as a role model. In Callahan's Key the patrons make a visit to the marina near Fort Lauderdale where the Busted Flush was usually moored in the McGee series. Similarly important to Robinson is writer Donald E. Westlake and Westlake's most famous character, John Dortmunder.

In 1992, Robinson was master-of-ceremonies for the Hugo Awards at MagiCon, the World Science Fiction Convention (Worldcon) in Orlando, Florida. From 1996 to 2005, he served as a columnist in the op-ed section (and briefly in the technology section) of The Globe and Mail.

In 2004, Robinson began working on a seven-page 1955 novel outline by the late Robert A. Heinlein to expand it into a novel. The book, titled Variable Star, was released on September 19, 2006. Robinson had previously written of his admiration for Heinlein in his 1980 essay "Rah, Rah, R.A.H.!", in the 1998 "Mentors", and in his book The Free Lunch. In an afterword to Variable Star, he recounts the story of how reading Rocket Ship Galileo, and soon after, Heinlein's other Heinlein juvenile novels, helped set the direction for his life, and how he came to write the novel. The novel reflects the very different writing styles of both Heinlein and Robinson; reviews of the books were mixed, praising Robinson's handling of a difficult task and the lively story, but criticizing the unlikely plot twists and trite romantic scenes.

== Personal life ==
Robinson has resided in Canada for over 50 years, primarily in the provinces of Nova Scotia and British Columbia. He and his wife Jeanne had a daughter, Terri Luanna da Silva, who once worked for Martha Stewart, and one granddaughter.

After living in Vancouver for a decade, he moved to Bowen Island in about 1999. He became a Canadian citizen in 2002, retaining his American citizenship. Jeanne underwent treatment for biliary cancer, and died May 30, 2010. Their daughter Terri died of breast cancer on December 5, 2014.

Robinson suffered a heart attack on August 31, 2013, but recovered. Due to the health issues faced by both himself and his family, he has not published a novel since 2008. In 2013, Robinson reported on his website that work on his next book Orphan Stars was progressing, albeit slowly. Concurrently, he has begun work on his autobiography.

He was named a Guest of Honor at the 76th World Science Fiction Convention in 2018.

== Awards and honors ==
- John W. Campbell Award for Best New Writer (1974)
- Hugo Awards for:
  - Best Novella (1977) By Any Other Name (later expanded into Telempath)
  - Best Novella (1978) Stardance (with Jeanne Robinson)
  - Best short story (1983) "Melancholy Elephants"
- Nebula Award for:
  - Best Novella (1977) Stardance (with Jeanne Robinson)
- 2008 Robert A. Heinlein Award (for Lifetime Achievement)
- 2015 LASFS Forrest J Ackerman Award for Lifetime Achievement
- Named a Guest of Honor at the 2018 World Science Fiction Convention
- Inkpot Award, 2001

== Published works ==
=== Novels and collections of linked stories ===
The following table can be sorted by any column.
Year	Title	Co-author	Series	Notes
1976	Telempath			
1977	Callahan's Crosstime Saloon		Callahan's/Jake Stonebender	Collection of linked stories
1979	Stardance	Jeanne Robinson	Stardance Trilogy	
1981	Time Travelers Strictly Cash		Callahan's/Jake Stonebender	Collection of linked stories; also contains several non-Callahan's stories
1982	Mindkiller		Deathkiller Trilogy	
1985	Night of Power			
1986	Callahan's Secret		Callahan's/Jake Stonebender	Collection of linked stories
1987	Time Pressure		Deathkiller Trilogy	
1989	Callahan's Lady		Lady Sally's	
1991	Starseed	Jeanne Robinson	Stardance Trilogy	
1992	Lady Slings the Booze		Lady Sally's	An excerpt from Lady Slings the Booze was published in a special edition novella called Kill the Editor in 1991.
1993	The Callahan Touch		Callahan's/Jake Stonebender	
1995	Starmind	Jeanne Robinson	Stardance Trilogy	
1996	Callahan's Legacy		Callahan's/Jake Stonebender	
1997	Lifehouse		Deathkiller Trilogy	
2000	Callahan's Key		Callahan's/Jake Stonebender	
2001	The Free Lunch			
2003	Callahan's Con		Callahan's/Jake Stonebender	
2004	Very Bad Deaths		Russell Walker	
2006	Variable Star	Robert A. Heinlein		Based on an outline Heinlein prepared in 1955.
2008	Very Hard Choices		Russell Walker	

=== Omnibus volumes ===
- Callahan and Company (1988)—omnibus edition of Callahan's Crosstime Saloon, Time Travelers Strictly Cash, and Callahan's Secret
- Off the Wall at Callahan's (1994)—a collection of quotes from books in the Callahan's/Lady Sally series
- The Callahan Chronicals (1997)—retitled republication of Callahan and Company
- The Star Dancers (1997; with Jeanne Robinson) omnibus edition of Stardance and Starseed

=== Short story collections ===
- Antinomy (1980)
- Melancholy Elephants Penguin (1984 – Canada; 1985 – United States)
- True Minds (1990)
- User Friendly (1998)
- By Any Other Name (2001)
- God Is an Iron and Other Stories (2002)
- My Favorite Shorts (2016; e-book only)

=== Anthologies ===
- The Best of All Possible Worlds (1980) – collection of works by other authors edited and introduced by Robinson
- "Compostela" Tesseracts 20 – with James Alan Gardner

=== Discography ===
- Belabouring the Obvious (2000)

=== Collected essays ===
- The Crazy Years: Reflections of a Science Fiction Original (2004), a collection of his articles for The Globe and Mail
