= Jeanne Robinson =

Canadian choreographer (1948–2010)

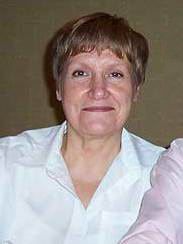
- Robinson at the 2004 Necronomicon
- Born: March 30, 1948; Boston, Massachusetts, U.S.
- Died: May 30, 2010 (aged 62); Bowen Island, British Columbia
- Education: Boston Conservatory
- Occupations: Choreographer, writer
- Spouse: Spider Robinson (m. 1975)
- Children: 1
- Website: spiderrobinson.com/jeanne.html

Jeanne M. Rubbicco Robinson (March 30, 1948 – May 30, 2010) was an American-born Canadian choreographer who co-wrote three science fiction novels, The Stardance Saga, with her husband Spider Robinson. Stardance won the Hugo Award and Nebula award for Best Novella in 1978 and 1977 respectively.

== Biography ==
Jeanne Robinson was born in Boston, Massachusetts to Dorothy and Peter Rubbicco. She studied dance at the Boston Conservatory, and at the Martha Graham, Alvin Ailey, and Erick Hawkins schools. She performed with the Beverly Brown Dance Ensemble in New York City.

Robinson was briefly married to Daniel Corrigan with whom she joined the back-to-the-land movement and began to practice Buddhism. She married fellow science-fiction writer Spider Robinson in 1975 and they had one daughter, Terri Luanna, who died in 2014. She moved to Nova Scotia, serving as the artistic director of the Nova Dance Theatre in Halifax, Nova Scotia, where she choreographed more than thirty original works. In 1985 the Canadian Broadcasting Corporation's hour-long coverage of the Dance in Canada Gala spent twenty minutes showing the performance of Robinson’s work, FICTION.

Her plans to establish the art form of free-fall dance, outlined in the Stardance trilogy, were cut short by the loss of space shuttle Challenger and cancellation of the Teacher in Space Project in 1986, although footage of her dancing on a parabolic flight in 2007 survives. In 1987 she closed her dance company due to trouble obtaining grants and moved to British Columbia with her family.

In 2006 she and her husband were invited by the First Lady to speak at the National Book Festival in Washington, DC. In addition to her dance and writing careers, Robinson was an active practitioner of Sōtō Zen Buddhism, a lay-ordained Buddhist monk. She spoke of her work as involving "moving koans, visual parables" but did not overtly mention Buddhism in her work until her work Zenki-zu which she created for Vancouver's Women in View festival in 1992. Along with her husband, she was awarded the Inkpot Award in 2001.

She was diagnosed with biliary tract cancer in February 2009 and began undergoing numerous treatments. She died, age 62, on May 30, 2010 and is buried in Saint Peters Cemetery in Provincetown, Massachusetts.
