= East Fishkill, New York =

- Town
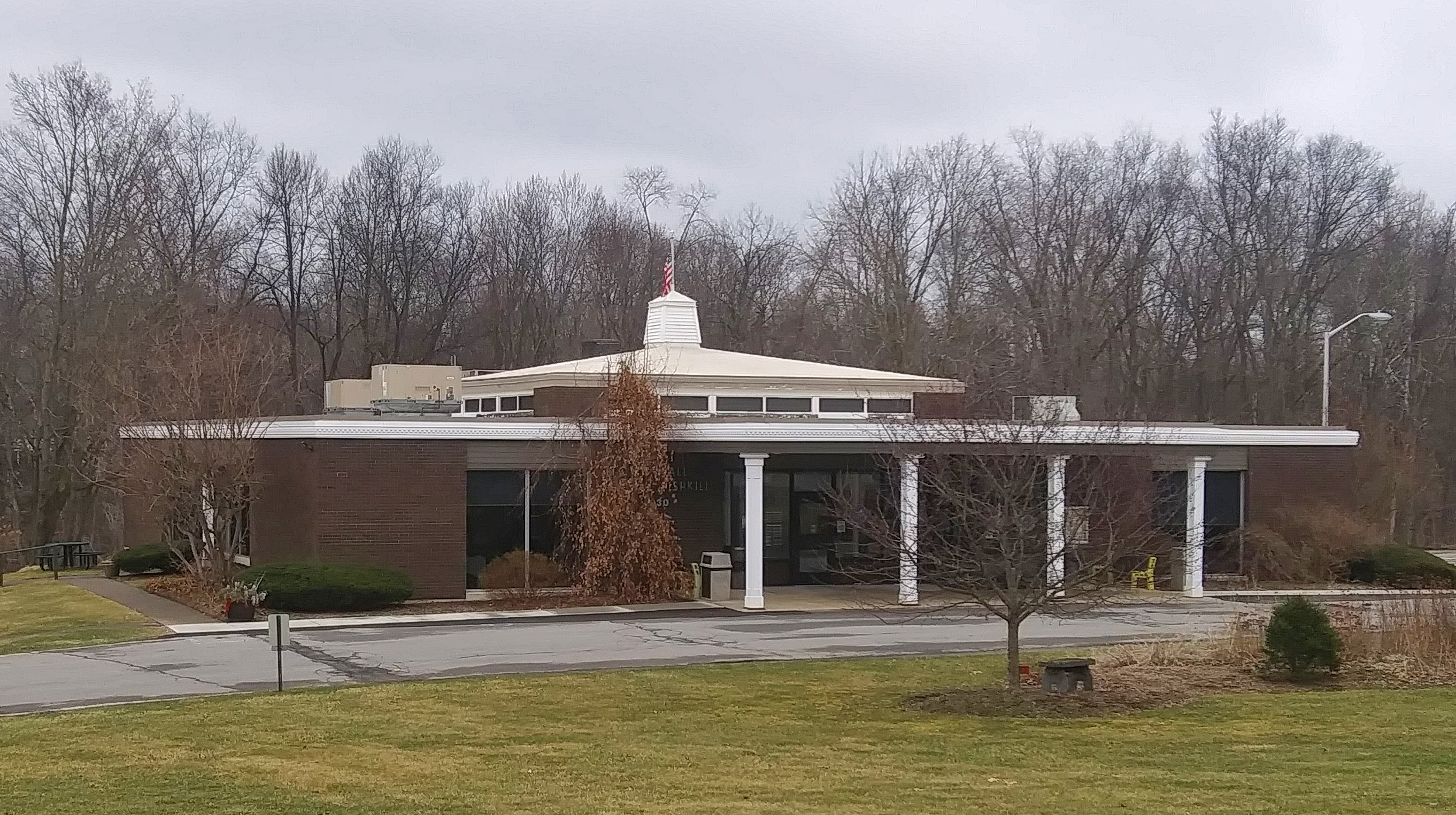
- Town hall, on NY Route 376 south of Hopewell Junction

- Seal

- Location of East Fishkill, New York
- Coordinates: 41°34′N 73°48′W
- Country: United States
- State: New York
- County: Dutchess
- Established: 1849

Government
  - Type: Town Council
  - Town Supervisor: Nicholas D'Alessandro (R)
  - Town Council: List: Anil R. Beephan Jr. (Republican); Peter Cassidy (R); Thomas Franco (R); Emanuele Marinaro (C)

Area
  - Total: 57.39 sq mi (148.63 km^{2})
  - Land: 56.51 sq mi (146.35 km^{2})
  - Water: 0.88 sq mi (2.29 km^{2})
- Elevation: 289 ft (88 m)

Population (2020)
  - Total: 29,707
  - Density: 521.0/sq mi (201.16/km^{2})
- Time zone: UTC-5 (Eastern (EST))
  - Summer (DST): UTC-4 (EDT)
- ZIP Codes: 12533 (Hopewell Junction); 12582 (Stormville); 12590 (Wappingers Falls); 12531 (Holmes)
- Area code: 845
- FIPS code: 36-027-21996
- GNIS feature ID: 0978917
- Website: eastfishkillny.gov

East Fishkill is a town on the southern border of Dutchess County, New York, United States. The population was 29,707 at the 2020 census. Until its creation in 1849, the town was the eastern portion of the town of Fishkill.

Hudson Valley Research Park is located in the town. The site once known as IBM East Fishkill, once housed 27 divisions and 4,700 regular employees for IBM Microelectronics, which later became a part of GlobalFoundries. IBM produced microchips at this facility, which also house the advanced automated processor fabrication facility where IBM's "Cell" microprocessor was co-developed. The fab's current owner is Onsemi.

== History ==
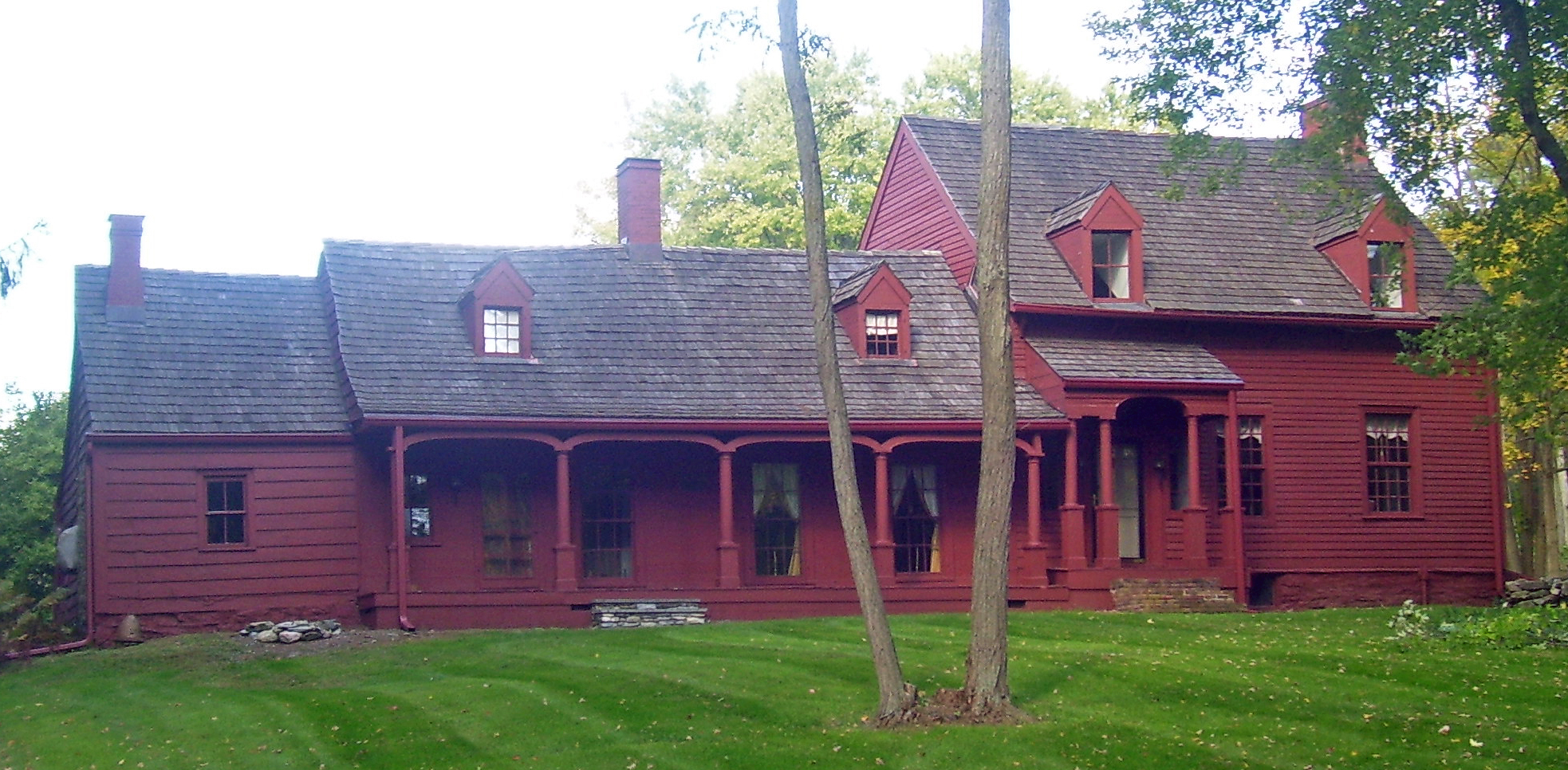
The Storm-Adriance-Brinckerhoff House, built in 1759

The Wiccopee, a sub-tribe of the Wappinger Native Americans, once lived in what is now the East Fishkill hamlet of Wiccopee. One early European settler arrived around 1759.

Platt Rogers Spencer, the inventor of the leading U.S. business-handwriting style of the 19th Century, was born in the area in 1800.

The town of East Fishkill was established in 1849 from the eastern part of the town of Fishkill. Its name comes from Fishkill Creek, known as the Vis Kille (Fish Creek) to the Dutch settlers in the area.

== Geography ==
According to the United States Census Bureau, the town has a total area of 57.4 square miles (148.6 km^{2}), of which 56.5 square miles (146.3 km^{2}) is land and 0.89 square miles (2.3 km^{2}), or 1.54%, is water.

East Fishkill is bordered on the west by Fishkill and Wappinger, on the north by LaGrange, and on the east by Beekman and Pawling. The southern town line borders Philipstown and Kent, both of which are part of Putnam County.

Interstate 84 and the Appalachian Trail pass across the town. The Taconic State Parkway runs north–south as well.

=== Climate ===
According to the Köppen Climate Classification system, East Fishkill has a hot-summer humid continental climate, abbreviated "Dfa" on climate maps. The hottest temperature recorded in East Fishkill was 101 °F (38.3 °C) on August 9, 2001, while the coldest temperature recorded was −22 °F (−30.0 °C) on January 27, 1994.

Climate data for Stormville, New York, 1991–2020 normals, extremes 1990–2007
Month	Jan	Feb	Mar	Apr	May	Jun	Jul	Aug	Sep	Oct	Nov	Dec	Year
Record high °F (°C)	67 (19)	68 (20)	90 (32)	95 (35)	96 (36)	93 (34)	100 (38)	101 (38)	92 (33)	85 (29)	77 (25)	71 (22)	101 (38)
Mean daily maximum °F (°C)	35.4 (1.9)	38.9 (3.8)	48.6 (9.2)	61.4 (16.3)	71.7 (22.1)	77.1 (25.1)	83.1 (28.4)	81.8 (27.7)	74.3 (23.5)	62.8 (17.1)	50.4 (10.2)	39.3 (4.1)	60.4 (15.8)
Daily mean °F (°C)	26.2 (−3.2)	29.0 (−1.7)	37.6 (3.1)	49.5 (9.7)	60.1 (15.6)	67.4 (19.7)	73.0 (22.8)	71.9 (22.2)	64.4 (18.0)	53.0 (11.7)	41.3 (5.2)	31.5 (−0.3)	50.4 (10.2)
Mean daily minimum °F (°C)	17.0 (−8.3)	19.1 (−7.2)	26.6 (−3.0)	37.5 (3.1)	48.5 (9.2)	57.7 (14.3)	63.0 (17.2)	62.0 (16.7)	54.5 (12.5)	43.2 (6.2)	32.3 (0.2)	23.6 (−4.7)	40.4 (4.7)
Record low °F (°C)	−22 (−30)	−11 (−24)	−2 (−19)	15 (−9)	31 (−1)	40 (4)	47 (8)	46 (8)	32 (0)	26 (−3)	11 (−12)	−1 (−18)	−22 (−30)
Average precipitation inches (mm)	3.72 (94)	3.42 (87)	3.95 (100)	3.82 (97)	3.62 (92)	4.48 (114)	4.36 (111)	3.75 (95)	5.07 (129)	4.71 (120)	3.90 (99)	4.14 (105)	48.94 (1,243)
Average snowfall inches (cm)	14.3 (36)	12.9 (33)	14.3 (36)	3.1 (7.9)	0.0 (0.0)	0.0 (0.0)	0.0 (0.0)	0.0 (0.0)	0.0 (0.0)	0.0 (0.0)	2.1 (5.3)	11.2 (28)	57.9 (146.2)
Average precipitation days (≥ 0.01 in)	13.0	9.9	12.7	12.5	12.5	11.4	10.6	10.3	10.1	9.2	10.6	11.1	133.9
Average snowy days (≥ 0.1 in)	8.7	5.9	5.6	1.3	0.0	0.0	0.0	0.0	0.0	0.1	1.4	5.2	28.2
Source 1: NOAA
Source 2: XMACIS2

== Demographics ==
Historical population
Census	Pop.	Note	%±
1850	2,610		—
1860	2,544		−2.5%
1870	2,305		−9.4%
1880	2,574		11.7%
1890	2,175		−15.5%
1900	1,970		−9.4%
1910	2,226		13.0%
1920	1,944		−12.7%
1930	1,845		−5.1%
1940	2,024		9.7%
1950	2,565		26.7%
1960	4,778		86.3%
1970	11,092		132.1%
1980	18,091		63.1%
1990	22,101		22.2%
2000	25,589		15.8%
2010	29,029		13.4%
2020	29,707		2.3%
U.S. Decennial Census

As of the census of 2000, there were 25,589 people, 8,233 households, and 7,006 families residing in the town. The population density was 449.7 inhabitants per square mile (173.6/km^{2}). There were 8,495 housing units at an average density of 149.3 per square mile (57.6/km^{2}). The racial makeup of the town was 92.54% white, 2.29% African American, 0.15% Native American, 2.8% Asian, 0.02% Pacific Islander, .86% from other races, and 1.34% from two or more races. Hispanic or Latino of any race were 4.04% of the population.

There were 8,233 households, out of which 45.8% had children under the age of 18 living with them, 75.7% were married couples living together, 6.5% had a female householder with no husband present, and 14.9% were non-families. Of all households 11.9% were made up of individuals, and 3.9% had someone living alone who was 65 years of age or older. The average household size was 3.10 and the average family size was 3.38.

In the town, the population was spread out, with 29.7% under the age of 18, 6.4% from 18 to 24, 30.4% from 25 to 44, 25.5% from 45 to 64, and 8.0% who were 65 years of age or older. The median age was 37 years. For every 100 females, there were 98.9 males. For every 100 females age 18 and over, there were 96.9 males.

The mean income for a household in the town was $116,059, and the mean income for a family was $129,660. Males had a median income of $59,735 versus $35,014 for females. The per capita income for the town was $28,553. About 1.5% of families and 2.8% of the population were below the poverty line, including 2.7% of those under age 18 and 3.7% of those age 65 or over.

== Locations ==
- Fishkill Plains – A hamlet in the northwestern part of the town.
- Gayhead – A location just outside of Hopewell Junction.
- Hillside Lake – A location northeast of Fishkill Plains.
- Hopewell Junction – A hamlet in the northwestern part of the town.
- Hortontown – A hamlet in the eastern section of town.
- Leetown - An area on top of Stormville Mountain, named after early settlers.
- Lomala – A hamlet south of Hopewell Junction.
- Pecksville – A hamlet in the southeastern corner of the town.
- Shenandoah – or Shenandoah Corners – A hamlet in the southern part of the town, near Interstate 84, the Taconic State Parkway, and the Appalachian Trail. The former Shenandoah Service Area on the Taconic Parkway is named for this community.
- Stormville – A hamlet in the eastern part of the town named after early settlers, brothers Jacob and Rupert Storm.
- Wiccopee (was named Johnsville c. 1800–1904) – A hamlet near the western town line. It includes the area of Fishkill Hook.

== See also ==
- 2 M6 cars (9030 and 9031) were donated to the MTA K9 Police Training Center and Connecticut Air National Guard, which is in Stormville.

== Notable residents ==
    - Anil Beephan Jr., politician, member of the New York State Assembly
    - Trenten Anthony Beram - Double Southeast Asia Games Gold Medalist Sprinter representing the Philippines
    - Ilya Bolotowsky - famous Russian Abstract Painter who spent summers on Palen Road
    - Greg Fleming, CEO of Rockefeller Capital Management
    - Gerardo Joseph Colacicco, vicar at St. Denis Church
    - Lucinda Franks, journalist
    - Willie Fraser, Major League Baseball player
    - Dominick John Lagonegro, pastor at St. Columba's Church
    - Henry Morgenthau Jr. - Secretary of the Treasury under Franklin D. Roosevelt; started Fishkill Farms orchard in Hopewell Junction
    - Patti Murin, actress
    - Curtis Ofori, professional soccer player on the New York Red Bulls
    - Joe Panik - former MLB second baseman most famous for winning the 2014 World Series with the San Francisco Giants
    - Paul Panik, college baseball coach, brother of Joe Panik
    - Sneha Anne Philip, doctor, declared a victim of the September 11 attacks in absentia
    - Jason Scott - technology historian and archivist
    - Thomas Storm, American Revolutionary war officer
    - William Peterfield Trent, academic and author
    - Gene Weingarten, Pulitzer prizewinning journalist
    - Richard Matuszewski, NCAA All American and Professional tennis player
