= Bykenhulle =

Historic house in New York, United States

- U.S. National Register of Historic Places
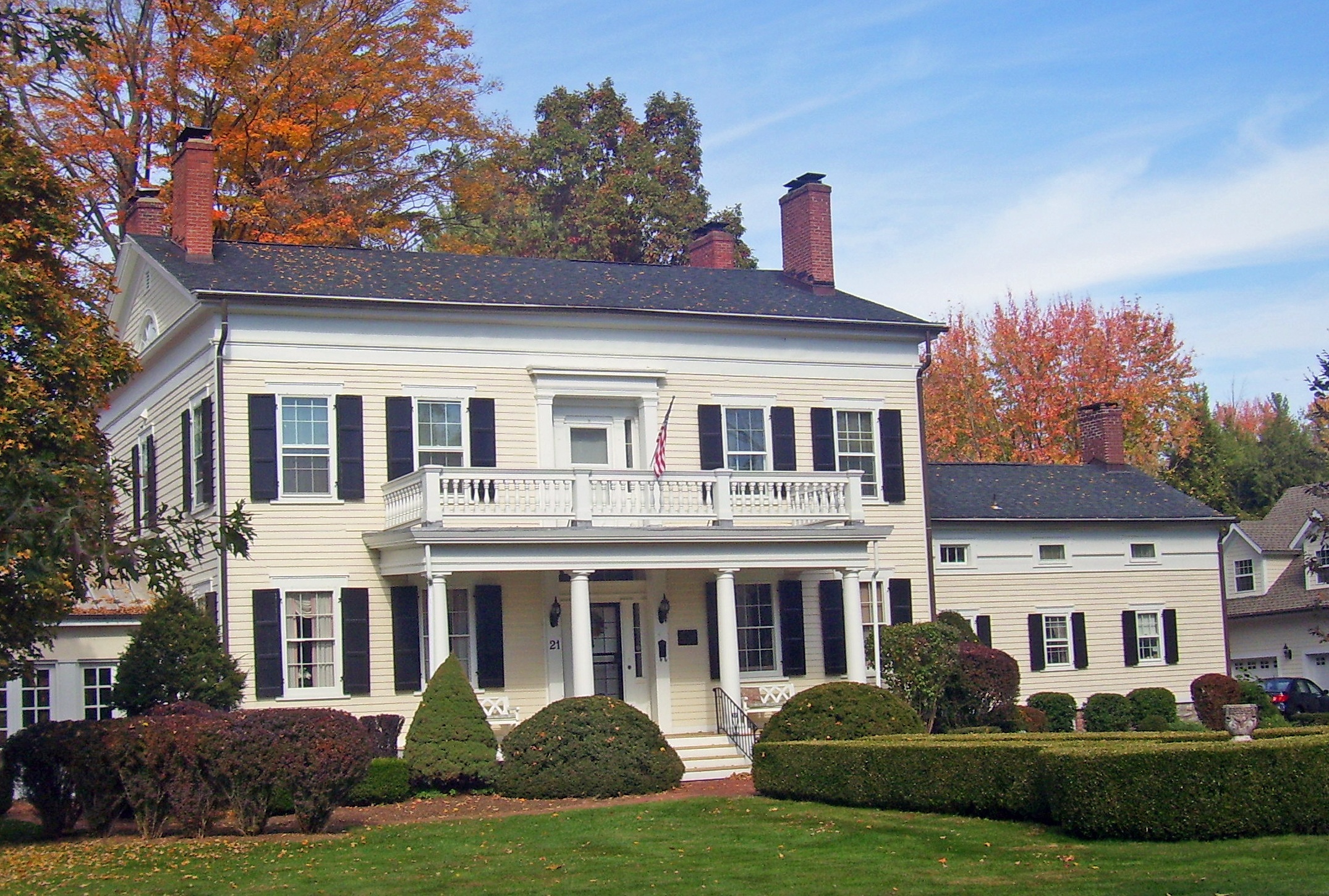
- South elevation and west profile, 2008

- Location within New York Location within the United States
- Interactive map showing the location of Bykenhulle
- Location: Hopewell Junction, New York
- Nearest city: Poughkeepsie
- Coordinates: 41°34′59″N 73°46′12″W
- Area: 5.7 acres (2.3 ha)
- Built: 1841
- Architectural style: Greek Revival
- NRHP reference No.: 91001872
- Added to NRHP: December 30, 1991

Bykenhulle, originally known as Ivy Hall, is a historic house located on Bykenhulle Road near the hamlet of Hopewell Junction, New York, United States, in the Town of East Fishkill. It is a wooden house in the Greek Revival architectural style.

First built in the middle of the 19th century by a member of the locally prominent Adriance family, it was originally the center of a large farmstead. By the early 20th century the failing farm was subdivided, leaving the house on a smaller lot. A later set of owners bought it for use as a country retreat and renamed it after the original Dutch spelling of their name.

They renovated and restored the house with the intent of preserving its historic character. It retains enough despite the much newer residential construction around it that, in 1991, it and two of its outbuildings were listed on the National Register of Historic Places. Currently it is used as a bed and breakfast.

== Buildings and grounds ==
Bykenhulle is located on a pair of lots totalling 5.7 acres (2.3 ha) in the north of East Fishkill. They are bordered by Bykenhulle Road on the south, neighboring residences on the east and west, and the Taconic State Parkway to the rear. It is on a slight rise just south of the Fishkill Creek flood plain. The neighborhood is wooded except for the cleared lots, many of which compare in size to Bykenhulle. A brick fence runs along the front.

The buildings are mostly located on the 3.7-acre (1.5 ha) lot, the larger of the two. At its east corner, a driveway leads in past the house and continues through to an exit at the parkway in the rear. A brick fence runs along the front of the property. The lot has mature trees and plantings, with an evergreen buffer at the rear along the parkway. The two-acre (8,000 m^{2}) lot to the southwest is today mostly a large lawn.

There are three other buildings and a swimming pool to the side and rear of the main house. Two of the buildings, a dairy barn and poultry house, date to the era of its construction and are considered contributing resources to the Register listing. The carriage house, now modified to serve as a garage, and swimming pool are not.

=== House ===
The main house's main block is a two-and-a-half-story, five-bay frame structure sided in clapboard. The south (front) facade has a centrally located three-bay porch, supported by four wooden columns, with a balustrade on top to serve as a balcony. All windows have wooden louvered shutters. Above a plain frieze, a gabled roof shingled in asphalt is pierced by two brick chimneys at either end. The north facade has a similarly centrally located entrance with roofless masonry porch and iron railing. Three dormer windows pierce the roof on this side.

A two-story, four-by-two-bay kitchen wing projects to the east. It has a similar treatment to the main block, with eyebrow windows in the frieze and an end chimney. The windows on its north facade are irregularly placed. The sunroom on the west end has glazed French doors on all three sides.

The recessed and trabeated main entrance is framed by pilasters on either side. The doorway is further framed by a transom and sidelights with pilasters decorated in a Greek style. The paneled door opens into a grand central hall with 11 feet (3.4 m) ceilings, encircled by a sculpted plaster cornice. The interior doorways have a post-and-beam surround similar to the exterior ones, and a stairway to the second floor has a mahogany spindled balustrade and finely detailed turned newel post.

On the west are two large parlors. They are similarly decorated to the hall, adding ceiling medallions, silver-plated door hardware and black marble mantelpieces. A wide pocket door entryway with enormous Grecian surround connects them. The functional rooms on the east are similar in scale but more restrained in their decoration. The second-story rooms follow a similar layout but are more restrained in scale and decoration.

=== Outbuildings ===
Directly behind the house is the dairy barn. It is a two-story wooden English barn modified with a basement and swing beam sided in galvanized iron designed to imitate clapboard. A screened pheasant coop has been attached to the west, and the northeast corner has been extended to build a garage.

The poultry house is located further to the northwest, in line with the house and barn. It is a long frame two-story structure, sided with the same material as the barn, that has been converted into a hunting lodge. A cobblestone chimney and fireplace has been added to the west side, and the roosts removed from the interior. The building is entered by tipping a carved wooden liquor bottle into a nearby shot glass to reveal a peephole.

The carriage house was original to the building, but has been modified over the years. It is a rectangular frame building with front-facing gabled roof similar to the house. Its interior has been converted into two apartments, and the exterior has had new windows added, some old ones close and been resided with wider modern clapboards.

There were two other buildings and one structure formerly located on the property. The latter is on the north side of the property, the site of a former well still visible in the woods near the Taconic. The collapsed remains of a frame milk house are located to the east of the carriage house, and between the two there was once a frame storage building, of which no trace remains.

== History ==
Peter Adriance, one of the descendants of Dutch settlers who moved from Long Island to Dutchess County in the late 18th century, gave the newly built house to his daughter Mary Ann and her husband, James Wilkinson, himself the scion of a wealthy Quaker family in the area, in 1841. From his 400-acre (160 ha) farm, he partitioned 150 acres (61 ha) to them. The house was in the highest of contemporary style, its dimension and decor less restrained than other Greek Revival farmhouses of the time. Finishings like the door hardware and marble mantelpieces would have been made in the city and brought to the house, testifying to the affluence of the Adriance family. They were on conspicuous display in the social spaces visitors would have experienced; the more restrained private and functional rooms are a reminder that the house was still the center of a large working farm.

A year after Peter Adriance died in 1852, his daughter and son-in-law availed themselves of the large inheritance he left her and moved to Poughkeepsie. They sold the house to a cousin on her mother's side, Charlotte Storm Genung, also descended from another old Dutchess settler, and her family. The Genungs named the house where their descendants would live for the next five decades Ivy Hall.

Very little is known about the Genungs during this period, as they apparently lived quietly, running the farm, making no changes to the house, building some of the outbuildings, and taking little role in public affairs. A county history in 1882 to which Charlotte's son Isaac contributed notes his ancestry and lists his profession as "farmer and assessor". It is the only record available about the Genung period of the house.

When Isaac died, his heirs were either unable or unwilling to sustain the farm, and defaulted on the mortgage. The farm and all its buildings and structures went into foreclosure. At a 1907 auction on the steps of the Dutchess County Court House in Poughkeepsie, it was sold for $4,000 ($143,000 in contemporary dollars) to a Moses Lee of Patterson. Two years later, he realized a profit, selling it for $5,750 ($206,000 in contemporary dollars) to Webster Wagner of New York City, a wealthy descendant of the co-inventor of the Pullman car. He delegated farming operations to tenants, preferring to use Ivy Hall as his country house.

It is believed that Wagner converted the poultry barn into a hunting lodge and built the pheasant coop so that he would have game birds to hunt, as hunting was a popular hobby among wealthy men of the era. He made no alterations to the house. In 1929 Florence Bicknell, wife of U.S. Rubber chairman John Bicknell, bought the house from Wagner for $100 ($2,000 in contemporary dollars). It is not known why the property changed hands for such small amount. The low price could have reflected the onset of the Great Depression, a personal relationship between the parties, or might simply be an error in recordkeeping.

Indicative of a strong interest in historic preservation as a reason to own the home, the Bicknells changed the name of the property to Bykenhulle, the original Dutch spelling of their name. That principle guided their completion of the main house's transition from farmhouse to country retreat. They added the current historically themed wallpaper to the front hall, put in modern heating and plumbing in an unobtrusive fashion and remodeling the northern rooms into a library and dining room. They made more changes to the upper story, eliminating a stair and replacing it with a false fireplace. In the process of modernizing the kitchen wing completely, they changed its original layout but kept its scale and design consistent with the main house.

In the late 1930s the Taconic State Parkway was built through the area, cutting the main house area off from some of its former pasturelands. In 1963, when the Bicknells sold the land, Mary Ann Wilkinson's wedding gift was subdivided into 1–2-acre (4,000–8,100 m^{2}) lots, spurring the current exurban residential development. The pool was added to the property in 1972, and a traditional garden planted in 1990. A year prior to the latter, the sunroom was added to the west of the house. Later owners of Bykenhulle have included an IBM executive and the current bed and breakfast operators, both of whom have continued to maintain the property's historic character.

== See also ==
- National Register of Historic Places listings in Dutchess County, New York
