= New York's 105th State Assembly district =

American legislative district

Assemblymember
Anil Beephan Jr. R–East Fishkill

New York's 105th State Assembly district is one of the 150 districts in the New York State Assembly. It has been represented by Republican Anil Beephan Jr. since 2023, succeeding Kieran Lalor.

== Geography ==
District 105 is in Dutchess County. It contains the towns of Amenia, Beekman, Dover, East Fishkill, Fishkill, La Grange, Pawling, Union Vale, and Wappinger.

== Recent election results ==
=== 2026 ===
2026 New York State Assembly election, District 105
Party	Candidate	Votes	%
Republican	Anil Beephan Jr.		
Conservative	Anil Beephan Jr.		
Total	Anil Beephan Jr. (incumbent)		
Democratic	Brooklyn Talarico		
Write-in			
Total votes			

=== 2024 ===
2024 New York State Assembly election, District 105
Party	Candidate	Votes	%
Republican	Anil Beephan Jr.	41,926	
Conservative	Anil Beephan Jr.	7,032	
Total	Anil Beephan Jr. (incumbent)	48,958	99.0
Write-in		515	1.0
Total votes		49,473	100.0
Republican hold			

=== 2022 ===
2022 New York State Assembly election, District 105
Party	Candidate	Votes	%
Republican	Anil Beephan Jr.	29,172	
Conservative	Anil Beephan Jr.	3,693	
Total	Anil Beephan Jr.	32,865	60.2
Democratic	Jill Fieldstein	20,030	
Working Families	Jill Fieldstein	1,678	
Total	Jill Fieldstein	21,708	39.8
Write-in		17	0.0
Total votes		54,590	100.0
Republican hold			

=== 2020 ===
2020 New York State Assembly election, District 105
Party	Candidate	Votes	%
Republican	Kieran Lalor	33,924	
Conservative	Kieran Lalor	4,554	
Independence	Kieran Lalor	896	
Total	Kieran Lalor (incumbent)	39,374	57.0
Democratic	Laurette Giardino	27,507	
Working Families	Laurette Giardino	2,181	
Total	Laurette Giardino	29,688	43.0
Write-in		200	0.0
Total votes		69,082	100.0
Republican hold			

=== 2018 ===
2018 New York State Assembly election, District 105
Party	Candidate	Votes	%
Republican	Kieran Lalor	24,654	
Conservative	Kieran Lalor	3,925	
Independence	Kieran Lalor	745	
Reform	Kieran Lalor	163	
Total	Kieran Lalor (incumbent)	29,487	57.4
Democratic	Laurette Giardino	20,833	
Working Families	Laurette Giardino	699	
Women's Equality	Laurette Giardino	346	
Total	Laurette Giardino	21,878	42.6
Write-in		14	0.0
Total votes		51,379	100.0
Republican hold			

=== 2016 ===
2016 New York State Assembly election, District 105
Party	Candidate	Votes	%
Republican	Kieran Lalor	29,499	
Conservative	Kieran Lalor	4,608	
Independence	Kieran Lalor	1,451	
Reform	Kieran Lalor	232	
Total	Kieran Lalor (incumbent)	35,790	62.5
Democratic	Joseph Torres	19,703	
Working Families	Joseph Torres	1,381	
Women's Equality	Joseph Torres	387	
Total	Joseph Torres	21,471	37.5
Write-in		23	0.0
Total votes		57,284	100.0
Republican hold			

=== 2014 ===
2014 New York State Assembly election, District 105
Party	Candidate	Votes	%
Republican	Kieran Lalor	17,334	
Conservative	Kieran Lalor	4,163	
Independence	Kieran Lalor	1,234	
Total	Kieran Lalor (incumbent)	22,731	65.5
Democratic	Joseph Torres	10,596	
Working Families	Joseph Torres	1,357	
Total	Joseph Torres	11,953	34.4
Write-in		23	0.1
Total votes		34,707	100.0
Republican hold			

=== 2012 ===
2012 New York State Assembly election, District 105
Party	Candidate	Votes	%
Republican	Kieran Lalor	23,347	
Conservative	Kieran Lalor	4,931	
Independence	Kieran Lalor	1,386	
Total	Kieran Lalor	29,664	55.7
Democratic	Paul Curran	21,037	
Working Families	Paul Curran	1,899	
Green	Paul Curran	620	
Total	Paul Curran	23,556	44.2
Write-in		24	0.1
Total votes		53,244	100.0
Republican hold			
