= Hopewell Junction, New York =

- Census-designated place
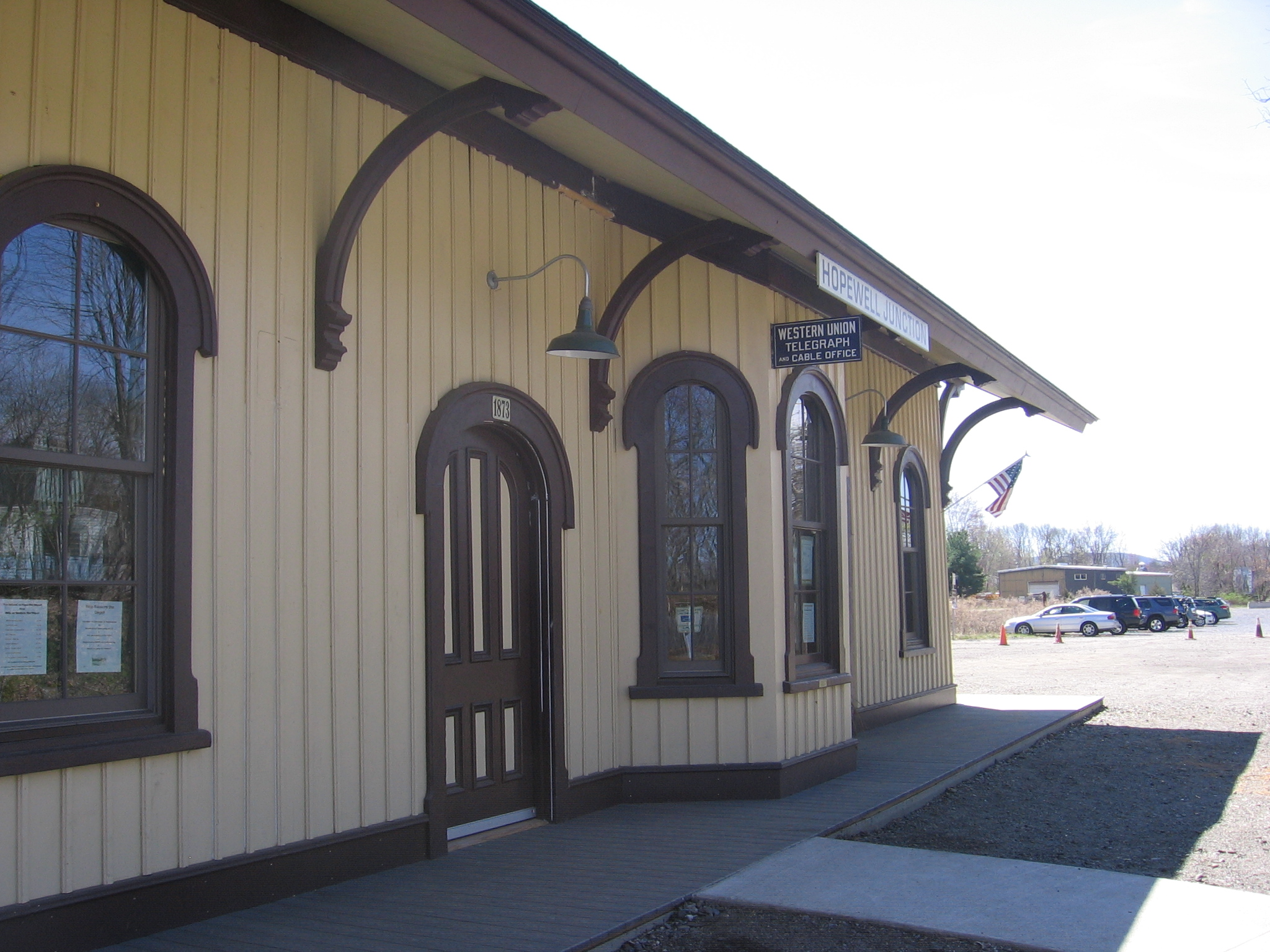
- The former rail depot that served the junction of ND&C, NY&NE, and DCR for which the community was named

- Location of Hopewell Junction, New York
- Coordinates: 41°35′2″N 73°48′31″W
- Country: United States
- State: New York
- County: Dutchess
- Town: East Fishkill

Area
  - Total: 0.75 sq mi (1.93 km^{2})
  - Land: 0.74 sq mi (1.92 km^{2})
  - Water: 0 sq mi (0.00 km^{2})
- Elevation: 246 ft (75 m)

Population (2020)
  - Total: 1,330
  - Density: 1,791.4/sq mi (691.65/km^{2})
- Time zone: UTC−5 (Eastern (EST))
  - Summer (DST): UTC−4 (EDT)
- ZIP Code: 12533
- Area code: 845
- FIPS code: 36-35573
- GNIS feature ID: 0953194

Hopewell Junction is a hamlet and census-designated place (CDP) in Dutchess County, New York, United States. The population was 1330 at the 2020 census. It is part of the Kiryas Joel–Poughkeepsie–Newburgh metropolitan area as well as the larger New York metropolitan area.

Hopewell Junction is located within the town of East Fishkill. It was originally a railroad junction where the Newburgh, Dutchess and Connecticut Railroad met the New York and New England Railroad and Dutchess County Railroad. All three became part of the New York, New Haven and Hartford Railroad system, and the ND&C to the southwest and the NY&NE are now owned by the Housatonic Railroad and used by Metro-North for equipment moves between its Hudson Line and Harlem Line. The last remaining section of passenger line, a branch from Pine Plains, south through Millbrook, to Hopewell Junction, to Beacon, lost its passenger service at some point between 1932 and 1938. The closest passenger facility is Beacon station on Metro-North's Hudson Line. Today, Hopewell Junction sits astride the bike/walk Empire State Trail where it is the juncture between the Dutchess Rail Trail running west to the Walkway Over the Hudson at Poughkeepsie and the more recently constructed Maybrook Trailway winding through the hills to Brewster, New York to almost meet the Putnam County Trailway and its continuations to New York City.

It was ranked #31 on Money magazine's "Most Desirable Places to Live" for 2005.

== Geography ==
Hopewell Junction is located near the center of the town of East Fishkill at 41°35′N 73°48′W (41.584, -73.806), to the north of Fishkill Creek.

According to the United States Census Bureau, the CDP has a total area of 0.50 square miles (1.3 km^{2}), mostly land, a significant reduction from the 2000 Census delineation, when the CDP had an area of 2.8 square miles (7.3 km^{2}).

== Demographics ==
Historical population
Census	Pop.	Note	%±
2020	1,330		—
U.S. Decennial Census

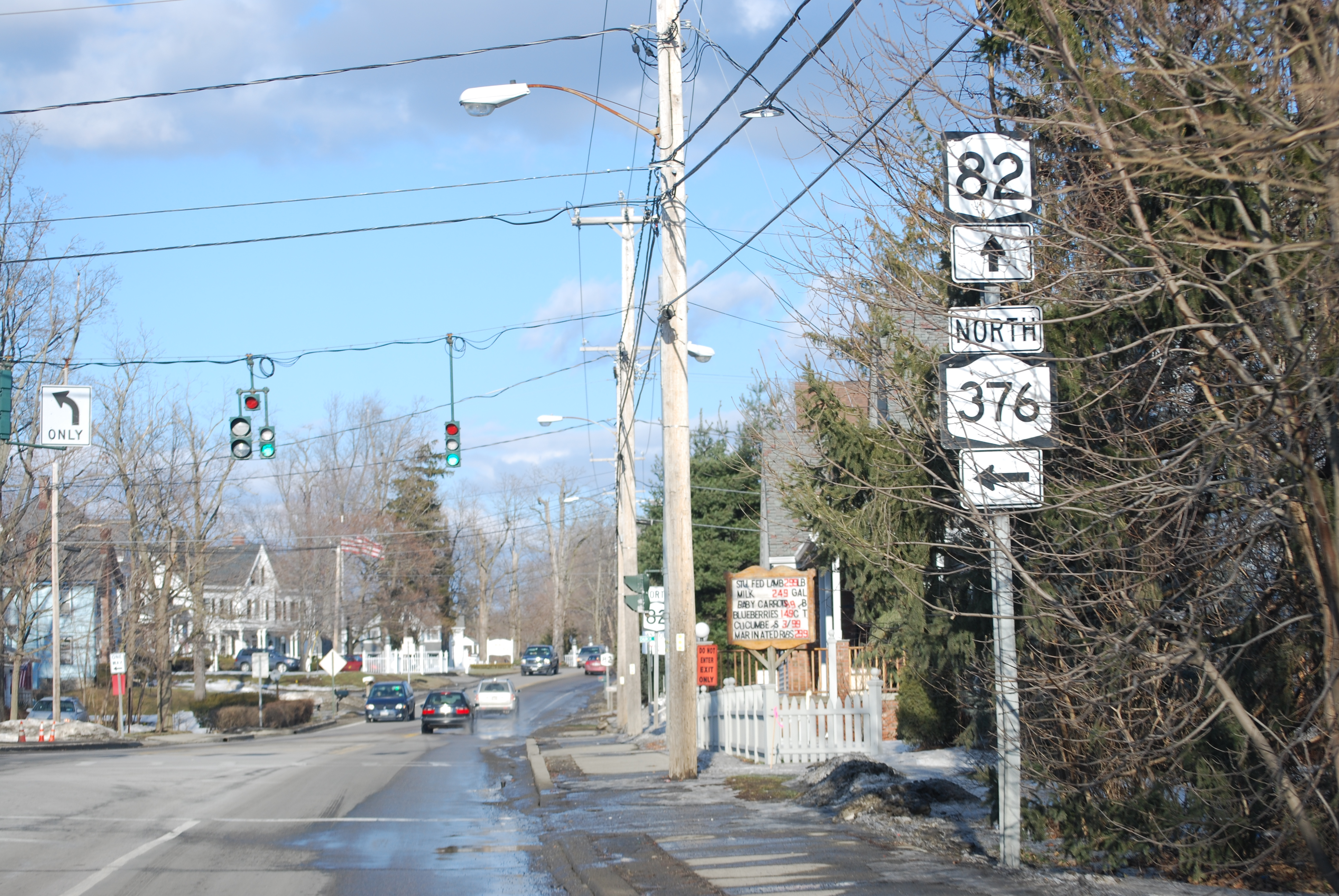
The NY 376 and NY 82 junction, which is located in Hopewell Junction

As of the census of 2000, there were 2,610 people, 894 households, and 688 families residing in the CDP. The population density was 923.4 inhabitants per square mile (356.5/km^{2}). There were 914 housing units at an average density of 323.4 per square mile (124.9/km^{2}). The racial makeup of the CDP was 92.26% White, 1.80% African American, 0.27% Native American, 3.91% Asian, 0.42% from other races, and 1.34% from two or more races. Hispanic or Latino of any race were 3.98% of the population.

There were 894 households, out of which 42.4% had children under the age of 18 living with them, 65.9% were married couples living together, 8.1% had a female householder with no husband present, and 23.0% were non-families. 19.6% of all households were made up of individuals, and 5.8% had someone living alone who was 65 years of age or older. The average household size was 2.91 and the average family size was 3.37.

In the CDP, the population was spread out, with 20.9% under the age of 18, 6.5% from 18 to 24, 29.1% from 25 to 44, 35.5% from 45 to 64, and 10.0% who were 65 years of age or older. For every 100 females, there were 96.7 males. For every 100 females age 18 and over, there were 94.9 males.

The median income for a household in the CDP was $106,042, and the median income for a family was $135,625. Males had a median income of $49,750 versus $33,092 for females. The per capita income for the CDP was $26,844. About 2.3% of families and 4.3% of the population were below the poverty line, including 5.3% of those under age 18.

== Transportation ==
Hopewell Junction is served by Dutchess County Public Transit's route F.

== Notable people ==
- Anil Beephan Jr., politician, member of the New York State Assembly
- Trenten Anthony Beram - Double Southeast Asia Games Gold Medalist Sprinter representing the Philippines
- Ilya Bolotowsky - famous Russian Abstract Painter who spent summers on Palen Road
- Greg Fleming, CEO of Rockefeller Capital Management
- Gerardo Joseph Colacicco, vicar at St. Denis Church
- Lucinda Franks, journalist
- Willie Fraser, Major League Baseball player
- Dominick John Lagonegro, pastor at St. Columba's Church
- Henry Morgenthau Jr. - Secretary of the Treasury under Franklin D. Roosevelt; started Fishkill Farms orchard in Hopewell Junction
- Patti Murin, actress
- Curtis Ofori, professional soccer player on the New York Red Bulls
- Joe Panik - former MLB second baseman most famous for winning the 2014 World Series with the San Francisco Giants
- Paul Panik, college baseball coach, brother of Joe Panik
- Sneha Anne Philip, doctor, declared a victim of the September 11 attacks in absentia
- Jason Scott - technology historian and archivist
- Thomas Storm, American Revolutionary war officer
- William Peterfield Trent, academic and author
- Gene Weingarten, Pulitzer prizewinning journalist
- Richard Matuszewski, NCAA All American and Professional tennis player
