= St. Columba's Church (Hopewell Junction, New York) =

Church of St. Columba
- Church of St. Columba
- 41°34′49″N 73°48′35″W
- Location: 835 Route 82, Hopewell Junction, New York
- Denomination: Roman Catholic
- Website: St. Columba Church

History
- Founded: 1992

Administration
- Archdiocese: Archdiocese of New York

The Church of St. Columba is a Roman Catholic parish church under the authority of the Roman Catholic Archdiocese of New York, located in Hopewell Junction, Dutchess County, New York State.

== History ==
St. Columba Parish was founded in 1904 as a mission of nearby St. Denis' Church. The pastor at the time was Father John Columba McEvoy, thus the origin of the parish name. During that time Mass was offered in the homes of parishioners, then as numbers increased larger spaces were found to gather. By 1904, Hopewell Junction had its own church near the railroad tracks. The church building is reported to have been relocated from Tivoli. Folklore tells us that the parishioners who were doing the moving accidentally dropped the building in the Hudson. Resourceful as any St. Denis parishioners of today, the movers fished the building out and brought it to its site. The new church was named St. Columba, the patron saint of Scotland. Tradition holds that the name was chosen because it was the middle name of the then pastor of St. Denis. The parish was thereafter referred to as St. Denis-St. Columba.

In the 1950s IBM came to East Fishkill and the Hopewell Junction population surged. The present property was purchased in 1959 by the Pastor of St. Denis, Monsignor Brody. The School and Convent were built in 1964. Sister Grace Imelda was the founding Principal of our School which opened in 1965. Religious services were held in the gymnasium of the school. The Church built under the leadership of Monsignor Joseph Meehan, was dedicated on April 14, 1989. St. Columba was finally established as its own Parish in 1992 with Bishop Dominick Lagonegro as its first Pastor.

Blessed Kateri Mission was established in 1998 to accommodate the ever-increasing number of new parishioners to the area. Blessed Kateri became its own Parish in 2002.
