= Anil Beephan Jr. =

American politician

Member of the New York State Assembly from the 105th district
- Incumbent
- Assumed office January 3, 2023
- Preceded by: Kieran Lalor

Personal details
- Born: June 11, 1994 (age 32)
- Party: Republican
- Education: Arcadia University (BA); Harvard University (ALM)
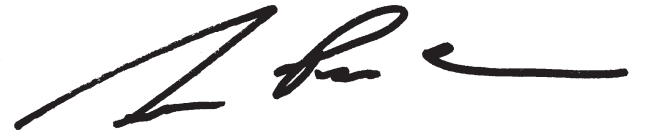
- Signature
- Website: Official website

Anil Beephan Jr. is an American politician and businessman who is a member of the New York State Assembly, representing the 105th district. His district comprises parts of Dutchess County. Prior to his election to the assembly in 2022, Beephan served as a councilman in East Fishkill. He is the first Republican of Indian descent to serve in the State Assembly.

== Career ==
Beephan's hometown is Hopewell Junction, New York.

He graduated from Arcadia University in Pennsylvania with a BA in political science in 2016 and earned a master's degree in management from Harvard Extension School in 2019.

Before entering politics, Beephan worked as a public relations and marketing strategist. He has worked in different legislative roles for New York State Senator Sue Serino. Prior to his election to the state assembly, Beephan served as a councilman in East Fishkill, New York.

Committee assignments

During the 2025–2026 legislative term, Beephan serves as the ranking minority member of the New York State Assembly Committee on Governmental Operations. He also serves on the Assembly committees on Corporations, Authorities and Commissions; Correction; Economic Development, Job Creation, Commerce and Industry; Local Governments; and Oversight, Analysis and Investigation. Beephan is additionally a member of the New York State Legislative Commission on State-Local Relations and the New York State Black, Puerto Rican, Hispanic & Asian Legislative Caucus.

Legislative diplomacy

While serving in the State Assembly, Beephan has participated in international legislative diplomacy and exchanges in his capacity as a New York state legislator. His international engagements have included official delegations and meetings in Israel, Germany, and Taiwan focused on government-to-government relations, economic development, security, and international cooperation.

== 2022 General Election ==
Beephan announced his candidacy for New York's 105th Assembly District in October 2021. He won the general election on November 8, 2022, with 60.4% of the vote. Beephan assumed office on January 1, 2023.

== Personal life ==
Beephan is a private pilot. He also served as a lieutenant and volunteer firefighter for East Fishkill Fire District. Beephan also served as a member of the East Fishkill Police Commission and liaison to emergency services pursuant to his role on the Town Board. His parents emigrated from Trinidad and Tobago.
