= Iraq Veterans for Congress =

- Founded: 2008
- Purpose: War in Iraq; Global war on terrorism
- Region served: United States

Iraq Veterans for Congress was a political organization consisting of military veterans who were Republican candidates for the United States House of Representatives in 2008.

== Overview ==
The candidates served during combat operations in Operation Iraqi Freedom, which they state forged them leaders who are "fearless, tested and ready to lead." A main objective of the organization is to counter what they feel is the "often misleading and biased reporting" on Iraq.

A prominent member of the organization was Duncan Duane Hunter, the son of Congressman and former presidential candidate Duncan Hunter of California. Roughly a quarter of the 110th United States Congress has military service on its resume, down from nearly 50 percent in 1991. According to a recent study by Duke University, veterans are under-represented in Congress compared to the population as a whole for the first time in U.S. history. The organization is closely allied to the Veterans for Freedom organization, which was founded by one of its members.

== History and political positions ==
Iraq Veterans for Congress was founded by Marine corporal Kieran Lalor. The organization positioned itself in stark contrast to anti-war veterans groups such as Veterans for a Secure America, and The Veterans' Alliance for Security and Democracy. The organization's platform included victory in Iraq, staying on the offensive in the war on terror, and taking care of all veterans.

The organization supported the claims of President George W. Bush that the administration's goal in the invasion was to bring democracy to countries in the Middle East and to oppose "islamofascism". While the organization typically avoids discussing the justifications leading up to the war, it pointed to what it viewed as American successes in Iraq. Massachusetts candidate Nathan Bech served in both wars.

== Activities ==
The organization has had spots on Fox News, Newsweek and major metropolitan papers, and members were invited to the National Republican Campaign Committees annual Washington, D.C. dinner in March 2008. The organization endorsed veteran John McCain for President of the United States, and urged Republicans to unite behind him as nominee. They hoped his presidential bid can help candidates for Congress achieve victory on his coattails.

== List of candidates ==
The array of candidates put forward by the group includes soldiers, sailors, airmen, and marine officers and enlisted personnel who served in the war in Iraq. While most ran against incumbent Democrats or running in a primary for an open seat, a few ran against Republican incumbents in primaries. All of the candidates pledged to run as a "united front" in support of each other, and the group will provide fund raising and volunteers to its candidates.

- Brian J. Rooney, Michigan's 7th congressional district
- Nathan Bech, Massachusetts's 1st congressional district
- David Bellavia, New York's 26th congressional district
- Will Breazeale, North Carolina's 7th congressional district
- Mike Coffman, Colorado's 6th congressional district
- Wayne E. Harmon, Indiana's 7th congressional district
- Duncan D. Hunter, California's 52nd congressional district
- Kieran Lalor, New York's 19th congressional district
- Tom Manion, Pennsylvania's 8th congressional district
- Vince Micco, New Jersey's 9th congressional district
- Bentley Rayburn, Colorado's 5th congressional district
- Tom Roughneen, New Jersey's 7th congressional district
- William Russell, Pennsylvania's 12th congressional district
- Matt Salisbury, Idaho's 1st congressional district
- Duane Sand, North Dakota's at-large congressional district
- Steve Stivers, Ohio's 15th congressional district
- Charlie Summers, Maine's 1st congressional district
- Allen West, Florida's 22nd congressional district
- Lee Zeldin, New York's 1st congressional district
