= Joe Panik =

American baseball player (born 1990)

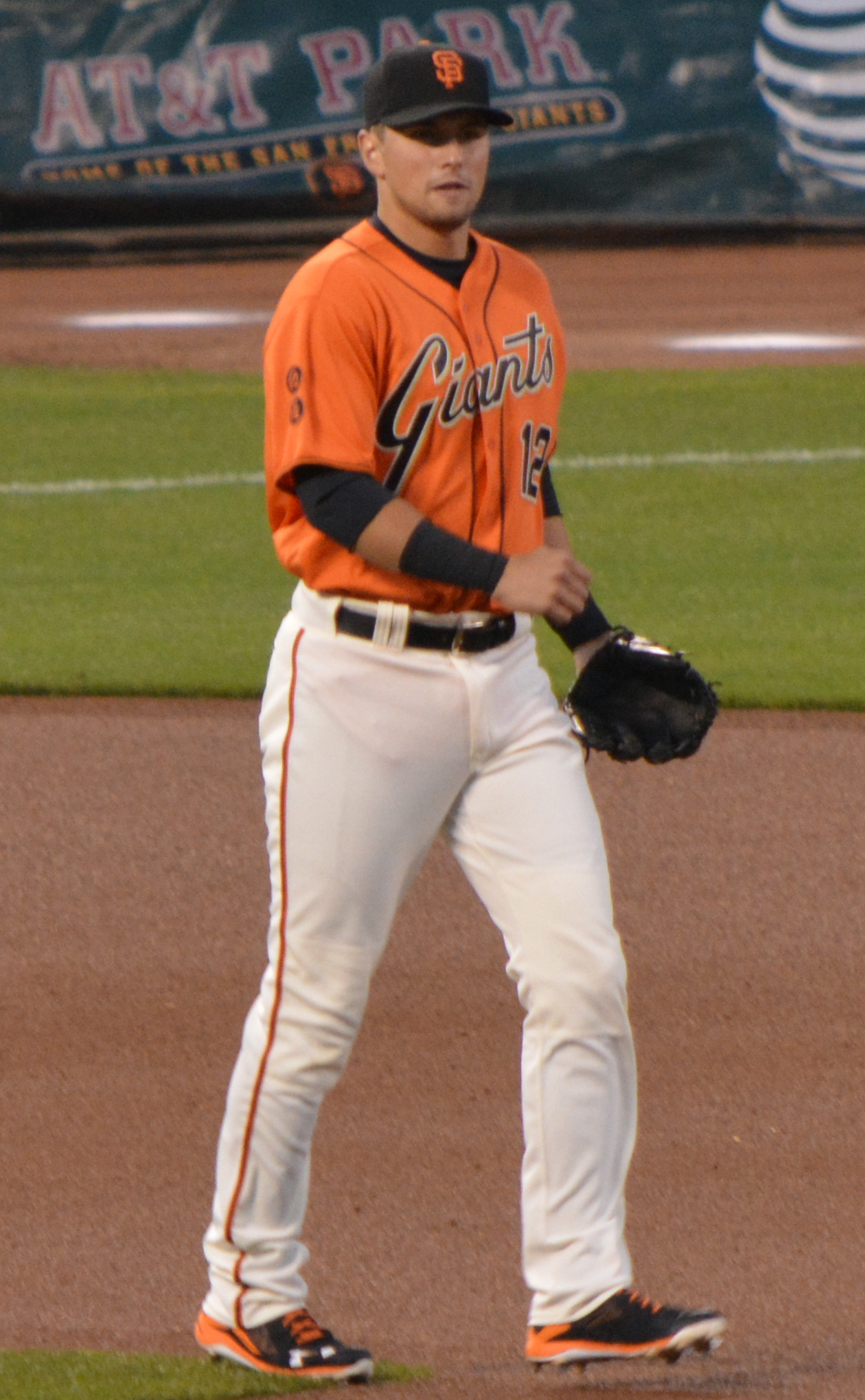
- Panik with the Giants in 2016
- Second baseman
- Born: October 30, 1990 (age 36); Yonkers, New York, U.S.
- Batted: Left Threw: Right

MLB debut
- June 21, 2014, for the San Francisco Giants

Last MLB appearance
- September 30, 2021, for the Miami Marlins

MLB statistics
- Batting average: .264
- Home runs: 42
- Runs batted in: 258
- Stats at Baseball Reference

Teams
- San Francisco Giants (2014–2019); New York Mets (2019); Toronto Blue Jays (2020–2021); Miami Marlins (2021)

Career highlights and awards
- All-Star (2015); World Series champion (2014); Gold Glove Award (2016); San Francisco Giants Wall of Fame

Joseph Matthew Panik (born October 30, 1990) is an American former professional baseball second baseman. He played in Major League Baseball (MLB) for the San Francisco Giants, New York Mets, Toronto Blue Jays, and Miami Marlins. Panik was an All-Star in 2015 and won a Gold Glove Award in 2016.

== Early life ==
Joseph Matthew Panik was born on October 30, 1990, in Yonkers, New York, to Paul and Natalie Panik. The family lived in East Fishkill during his formative years. He attended John Jay High School in Hopewell Junction.

== College career ==
Panik attended St. John's University, where he played college baseball for the St. John's Red Storm, competing in the Big East Conference. After his sophomore season in 2010, Panik played collegiate summer baseball for the Yarmouth–Dennis Red Sox of the Cape Cod Baseball League, where he batted .297 in 50 games, was named the starting shortstop for the East Division All-Star team, and received the league's sportsmanship award.

During his junior season, Panik compiled a .398 batting average with 19 doubles, 10 home runs, and 57 runs batted in (RBI), ranking tenth among college baseball players with a .509 on-base percentage (OBP). Panik played the first-ever game at Citi Field in a pre-season game between St. John's University and Georgetown on March 29, 2009.

Panik earned All-America honors from the American Baseball Coaches Association (ABCA), Baseball America and Louisville Slugger. Panik was also a finalist for the Brooks Wallace Award, an honor given to the nation's top shortstop. He was also a first team ABCA All-Northeast Region honoree, a first team All-Big East selection, and the Red Storm Most Valuable Player.

== Professional career ==
=== Draft and minor leagues ===
Out of St. John's, the San Francisco Giants drafted Panik in the first round, with the 29th overall selection, of the 2011 Major League Baseball draft. Panik made his professional debut with the Salem-Keizer Volcanoes of the Low-A Northwest League. He led the league with a .341 batting average, 49 runs scored, 54 RBI and a .401 on-base percentage (OBP) for Salem-Keizer, winning the league's Most Valuable Player Award. He was rated the tenth best second base prospect prior to the 2012 season and was invited to spring training.

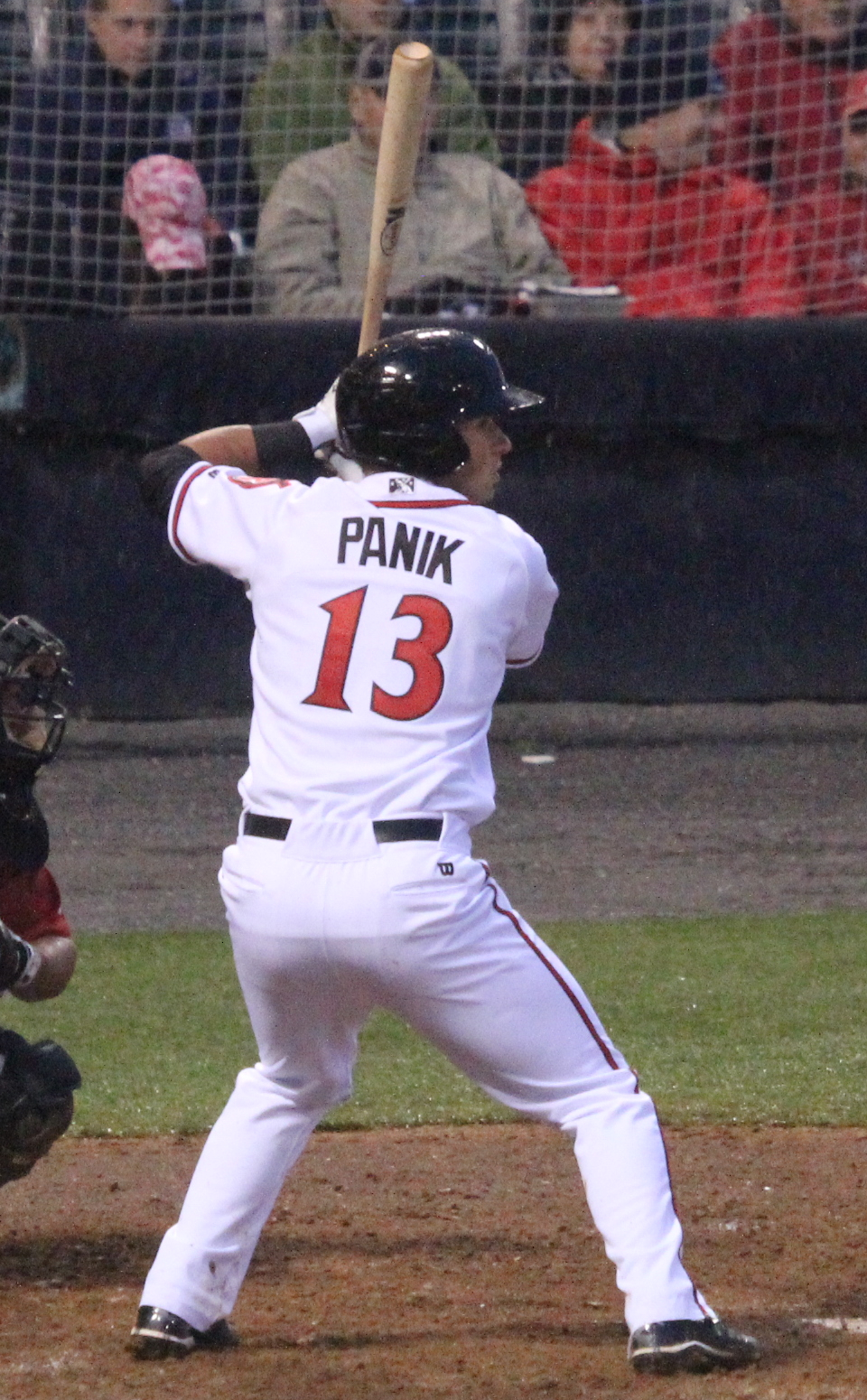
Panik with the Richmond Flying Squirrels in 2013

Panik spent the 2012 season with the San Jose Giants of the High-A California League, batting .297 with 27 doubles, seven home runs, and 76 RBI in 130 games. In 2013, Panik was promoted to the Richmond Flying Squirrels of the Double-A Eastern League, where he was moved to second base and recorded a .333 on-base percentage and 27 doubles, four triples, four homers. In 2014, Panik started the season with the Fresno Grizzlies of the Triple-A Pacific Coast League, where he hit .321, with five home runs, 45 RBI, and 50 runs scored in 74 games.

=== San Francisco Giants (2014–2019) ===
==== 2014–2015 ====
Panik made his MLB debut on June 21, 2014, pinch-hitting for the pitcher in the eighth inning and drawing a walk against Arizona Diamondbacks relief pitcher Matt Stites in a game the Giants won 6–4. Panik's first Major League start came the next day, when he batted seventh and played second base. In his second at-bat in that game he registered his first MLB hit. Panik hit his first home run on August 22, against Doug Fister of the Washington Nationals. It was a three-run home run (one of Panik's four hits that night), which gave the Giants the lead in a game they eventually won 10–3. On September 1, Panik pinch-hit in the resumption of a game against the Colorado Rockies that began on May 22 but was suspended due to rain. Per MLB record-keeping policy, Panik's debut is formally recognized as May 22, 2014.

Panik's five hits in his first two career postseason games are the most in Giants franchise history. On October 16, in the 2014 National League Championship Series, Panik hit a two-run home run in Game 5 to help lead the Giants to an eventual 6–3 victory over the Cardinals to advance to the 2014 World Series against the Royals. On October 29, in Game 7 of the World Series, the Giants beat the Kansas City Royals 3–2 to win the series. In the bottom of the third inning with a runner on first, Panik made a diving stop on a ball up the middle and flipped the ball with his glove to shortstop Brandon Crawford to get the lead runner out. Crawford then threw to first to try to get a sliding Eric Hosmer out. Initially, Hosmer was called safe on the play, but after a three-minute replay review, the call was overturned for the 4–6–3 double play. It was the first-ever overturned call in the World Series since the replay review system was implemented, and the double play was regarded by multiple sportswriters as one of the most spectacular plays in World Series history.

In the 2014 regular season, Panik played in 73 games and recorded 269 at bats. He scored 31 runs and 82 hits. He had 10 doubles and two triples along with one home run. Panik also recorded 18 runs batted. He was walked 16 times and struck out 33 times. He did not steal any bases. He finished with a .305 average and an on base percentage of .343.

Panik was named to the Giants' 2015 Opening Day 25-man roster. On April 22, 2015, Panik hit a walk-off sacrifice fly in the bottom of the ninth inning to defeat the Los Angeles Dodgers 3–2. Panik hit another walk-off nine days later on May 1, a pinch-hit, bases-loaded single against the Los Angeles Angels of Anaheim. On May 3, in a 5–0 win over the Los Angeles Angels of Anaheim, Panik batted second and homered off Jered Weaver right after Nori Aoki homered to start the game. It was the first time the Giants started off a game with consecutive home runs since 1964. On July 6, Panik was selected as a reserve player for the 2015 All Star Game.

On August 3, Panik was placed on the 15-day disabled list with lower back inflammation. He returned for three games in September before he was shut down for the season. For the 2015 season, Panik batted .312, with 8 home runs, 37 RBIs, and 59 runs scored. After the season, Panik revealed his "back inflammation" was actually a stress fracture of the L5 vertebra, which had fully healed by December.

==== 2016–2019 ====
Panik played in a career-high 127 games in 2016, hitting 10 home runs and 62 RBIs, although his batting average dipped to .239. Panik missed most of July with concussion symptoms after being hit in the head by a pitch from (future teammate) Matt Moore on June 18. After the season, Panik was awarded a Gold Glove, becoming the first Giants second baseman to win since Robby Thompson in 1993.

In 2017, Panik set a Giants franchise record, and tied the MLB record, with 12 hits in a three-game series against the Colorado Rockies from September 4–6. He was the first major leaguer to accomplish the feat since Jerry Remy in 1981. For the season, he batted .288/.347/.421.

On Opening Day against the Los Angeles Dodgers in 2018, Panik hit a solo home run off Clayton Kershaw, with the Giants winning the game 1–0. The next evening, Panik hit a solo home run off Kenley Jansen in the top of the ninth inning, again lifting the Giants to a 1–0 victory, and becoming the first player in MLB history to homer for his team in back-to-back 1–0 victories. He also hit a solo shot in the Giants' home opener against the Seattle Mariners, making him the first MLB player to score his team's first 3 runs in a season off solo home runs. On July 7, he was placed on the disabled list. He was reactivated on July 30, 2018. For the season he batted .254/.307/.332 with 4 home runs in 358 at bats.

On August 6, 2019, Panik was designated for assignment. He had been hitting .235/.310/.317, with an OPS of .627 and 3 home runs. He was placed on release waivers on August 7.

=== New York Mets (2019) ===
On August 9, 2019, Panik signed with the New York Mets. He tallied his first Mets hit as part of a ninth-inning rally on August 9, and recorded his first Mets RBI two days later. He batted .277/.333/.404, with 12 RBIs and 2 home runs, during his time with the Mets. Panik became a free agent following the 2019 season.

=== Toronto Blue Jays (2020–2021) ===
On January 18, 2020, Panik signed a minor league deal with the Toronto Blue Jays. He impressed in Spring Training and was added to the 40-man roster on March 15. Overall with the 2020 Blue Jays, Panik batted .225 with one home run and 7 RBIs in 41 games. In the AL Wild Card Series against the Tampa Bay Rays, he went 1 for 6, making the final out in both games as the Blue Jays were swept in the best-of-3 series.

On February 12, 2021, Panik re-signed with the Blue Jays organization on a minor league contract that included an invitation to Spring Training. On April 1, 2021, Panik was selected to the 40-man roster. In 42 games for Toronto, Panik batted .246/.293/.351 with 2 home runs and 11 RBI.

=== Miami Marlins (2021) ===
On June 29, 2021, Panik was traded to the Miami Marlins alongside minor league pitcher Andrew McInvale in exchange for Adam Cimber and Corey Dickerson. Panik played in 53 games for the Marlins, hitting .172 with 1 home run and 7 RBIs. Panik was designated for assignment by Miami on October 1. On October 4, Panik elected free agency.

Panik announced his retirement from professional baseball on May 19, 2022.

== Post-playing career ==
On March 26, 2023, Panik rejoined the San Francisco Giants organization as a special assistant.

== Personal life ==
Panik and his wife, Brittany (née Pinto), have known each other since they were children and married in December 2016. They live in Hopewell Junction, New York. In 2021, they had their first child, a daughter.

He has participated in a baseball clinic hosted by Matt Barnes at a Newtown, Connecticut, Youth Academy for elementary school students in the aftermath of the Sandy Hook Elementary School shooting. His brother, Paul Panik, is a college baseball coach.
