= 1996 Japan Series =

Team (Wins)	Managers	Season
Orix BlueWave (4)	Akira Ohgi	74–50–6, .597, GA: 7
Yomiuri Giants (1)	Shigeo Nagashima	77–53, .592, GA: 5
- Dates: October 19–24
- MVP: Troy Neel (ORX)
- FSA: Toshihisa Nishi (YOM)

Broadcast
- Television: NTV (Games 1–2), KTV (Games 3–4), NHK BS-1 (Game 3), MBS (Game 5)
- Radio: NHK Radio 1, TBS (JRN), JOQR (NRN), JOLF (NRN), Radio Nippon (independent), MBS (JRN), ABC (NRN), OBC (Kansai only)

The 1996 Japan Series was the championship series of Nippon Professional Baseball (NPB) for the 1996 season. The 47th edition of the Series, it was a best-of-seven playoff that matched the Pacific League champion Orix BlueWave against the Central League champion Yomiuri Giants. The series was the eighth time the two franchises played each other for the championship; however, the last time the two teams played, Orix was known as the Hankyu Braves. Played at Tokyo Dome and Green Stadium Kobe, the BlueWave defeated the Giants four games to one in the best-of-seven series to win the franchise's 4th Japan Series title. BlueWave slugger and 1996 PL home run leader Troy Neel was named Most Valuable Player of the series. The series was played between October 19 and October 24, 1996, with home field advantage going to the Central League.

== Summary ==
PL Orix BlueWave (4) vs. CL Yomiuri Giants (1)

Game	Date	Score	Location	Time	Attendance
1	October 19	Orix BlueWave – 4, Yomiuri Giants – 3	Tokyo Dome	3:42	45,121
2	October 20	Orix BlueWave – 2, Yomiuri Giants – 0	Tokyo Dome	2:56	45,086
3	October 22	Yomiuri Giants – 2, Orix BlueWave – 5	Green Stadium Kobe	2:56	33,026
4	October 23	Yomiuri Giants – 5, Orix BlueWave – 1	Green Stadium Kobe	3:25	33,070
5	October 24	Yomiuri Giants – 2, Orix BlueWave – 5	Green Stadium Kobe	3:26	33,222

== Matchups ==
=== Game 1 ===
Saturday, October 19, 1996 6:04 pm (JST) at Tokyo Dome, Bunkyo, Tokyo
Team	1	2	3	4	5	6	7	8	9	10	R	H	E
Orix	0	0	0	0	0	0	0	3	0	1	4	7	0
Yomiuri	1	0	0	0	0	0	0	0	2	0	3	8	0
WP: Taira Suzuki (1–0) LP: Hirofumi Kono (0–1) Sv: Masafumi Hirai (1); Home runs: ORX: Ichiro Suzuki (1); YOM: Takeshi Omori (1)

=== Game 2 ===
Sunday, October 20, 1996 6:33 pm (JST) at Tokyo Dome, Bunkyo, Tokyo
Team	1	2	3	4	5	6	7	8	9	R	H	E
Orix	0	0	0	2	0	0	0	0	0	2	6	1
Yomiuri	0	0	0	0	0	0	0	0	0	0	2	0
WP: Willie Fraser (1–0) LP: Hiromi Makihara (0–1) Sv: Taira Suzuki (1)

=== Game 3 ===
Tuesday, October 22, 1996 6:10 pm (JST) at Green Stadium Kobe, Kobe, Hyōgo
Team	1	2	3	4	5	6	7	8	9	R	H	E
Yomiuri	0	1	0	0	0	1	0	0	0	2	7	0
Orix	1	4	0	0	0	0	0	0	X	5	9	0
WP: Koji Noda (1–0) LP: Balvino Gálvez (0–1) Sv: Taira Suzuki (2); Home runs: YOM: Shane Mack (1), Toshihisa Nishi (1); ORX: None

=== Game 4 ===
Wednesday, October 23, 1996 6:10 pm (JST) at Green Stadium Kobe, Kobe, Hyōgo
Team	1	2	3	4	5	6	7	8	9	R	H	E
Yomiuri	0	2	0	0	0	1	2	0	0	5	8	0
Orix	0	0	1	0	0	0	0	0	0	1	5	2
WP: Masao Kida (1–0) LP: Jiro Toyoda (0–1) Sv: Hiroshi Ishige (1); Home runs: YOM: Takeshi Omori (2); ORX: None

=== Game 5 ===
Thursday, October 24, 1996 6:10 pm (JST) at Green Stadium Kobe, Kobe, Hyōgo
Team	1	2	3	4	5	6	7	8	9	R	H	E
Yomiuri	0	0	1	1	0	0	0	0	0	2	7	0
Orix	0	0	5	0	0	0	0	0	X	5	7	1
WP: Takahide Itoh (1–0) LP: Masaki Saito (0–1) Sv: Taira Suzuki (3); Home runs: YOM: Toshihisa Nishi (2); ORX: None

== See also ==
- 1996 World Series
