= George Oros =

American lawyer (born 1954)

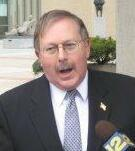

Member of the Westchester County Board of Legislators from the 1st district
- In office January 1, 1996 – January 1, 2010
- Preceded by: Timothy S. Carey
- Succeeded by: John G. Testa

Personal details
- Born: 1954 (age 71–72) Trenton, New Jersey, U.S.
- Party: Republican
- Spouse: Marianne Baggini
- Children: 2
- Education: Pace University (BBA, JD)
- Occupation: Lawyer

George Oros (born 1954) is an American lawyer and Republican politician from Cortlandt Manor, New York.

== Early life and education ==
Oros was born in Trenton, New Jersey, and moved to White Plains, New York, to attend college. Oros earned a Bachelor of Business Administration from Pace University and a Juris Doctor from the Pace University School of Law.

== Career ==
Along with practicing law as Assistant Town Attorney of Cortlandt Manor, Oros served for eight years, as the Assistant to the Director of Pace's Michaelian Institute of Suburban Governance. He is currently a partner in the firm of Brotman, Oros & Brusca, in White Plains, New York.

Oros began his career in politics on Cortlandt's Zoning Board of Appeals before being elected to the Town Board. In 1995, he ran for an open seat on the County Board of Legislators and he quickly ascended to the board's top position as its Chairman after only 9 months in office. When the Republicans lost their majority in 1999, Oros became the board minority leader. He sits on the Board of Directors of the Hudson Valley Hospital Center and also served on the Hudson Valley Gateway Chamber of Commerce's Executive Board.

In February 2008, he announced that he was a candidate for Congress against incumbent freshman Democrat John Hall in the traditionally Republican-leaning 19th congressional district. Several candidates entered the race, including Iraq veteran Kieran Lalor, MTA Vice-Chairman Andrew Saul, and former Congressman Joe DioGuardi. On May 22, 2008, Republican delegates from each of the five counties represented in the 19th district met in Mahopac, New York, to choose to endorse Lalor. Oros immediately vowed to stay in the race and mount a primary challenge to Lalor. Oros later suspended his campaign.

=== Electoral history ===
Westchester County Legislator - District 1, 2007
Party	Candidate	Votes	%	±%
Republican	George Oros (I)	5123	51.5%	Republican hold
Democratic	Domenic Volpe Jr.	4828	48.5%	

Westchester County Legislator - District 1, 2005
Party	Candidate	Votes	%	±%
Republican	George Oros (I)	6225	54.5%	Republican hold
Democratic	Domenic Volpe Jr.	5204	45.5%	

Westchester County Legislator - District 1, 2003
Party	Candidate	Votes	%	±%
Republican	George Oros (I)	5529	100.0%	Republican hold

Westchester County Legislator - District 1, 2001
Party	Candidate	Votes	%	±%
Republican	George Oros (I)	6397	86.8%	Republican hold
Green	Marilyn Ellie	620	8.4%	
Right to Life	James J. Hamilton	353	4.8%	

Westchester County Legislator - District 1, 1999
Party	Candidate	Votes	%	±%
Republican	George Oros (I)	5536	84.3%	Republican hold
Independent	Charles G. DiGiacomo	767	11.7%	
Right to Life	James J. Hamilton	262	4.0%	

== See also ==
- Westchester County, NY

Preceded by Timothy S. Carey	Westchester County Legislator, 1st District; 1995-2009	Succeeded by John G. Testa
