= Hillside Lake, New York =

- Census-designated place
- Location of Hillside Lake, New York
- Coordinates: 41°37′11″N 73°47′34″W
- Country: United States
- State: New York
- County: Dutchess
- Town: East Fishkill

Area
  - Total: 0.56 sq mi (1.46 km^{2})
  - Land: 0.52 sq mi (1.35 km^{2})
  - Water: 0.039 sq mi (0.10 km^{2})
- Elevation: 374 ft (114 m)

Population (2020)
  - Total: 1,091
  - Density: 2,086.8/sq mi (805.73/km^{2})
- Time zone: UTC-5 (Eastern (EST))
  - Summer (DST): UTC-4 (EDT)
- ZIP Code: 12590 (Wappingers Falls)
- FIPS code: 36-34803
- GNIS feature ID: 1867407

Hillside Lake is a hamlet and census-designated place (CDP) in Dutchess County, New York, United States. As of the 2020 census, Hillside Lake had a population of 1,091. It is part of the Kiryas Joel–Poughkeepsie–Newburgh, NY Metropolitan Statistical Area as well as the larger New York–Newark–Bridgeport, NY-NJ-CT-PA Combined Statistical Area.

== Geography ==
Hillside Lake is located in the northern part of the town of East Fishkill at 41°37′11″N 73°47′34″W. The community surrounds a small lake, also called Hillside Lake.

According to the United States Census Bureau, the CDP has a total area of 0.58 square miles (1.5 km^{2}), of which 0.54 square miles (1.4 km^{2}) is land and 0.04 square miles (0.1 km^{2}), or 7.08%, is water.

== Transportation ==

The main road connecting the hamlet to the New York state highway system is County Route 33 (CR 33), also known as Hillside Lake Road. The road runs for 3.0 miles (4.8 km) from CR 29 (partly serving as a continuation of Hillside Lake Road) near the hamlet of Fishkill Plains to CR 21 in the town of LaGrange. CR 33 itself does not directly intersect with any state routes but can be accessed from New York State Route 376 (via CR 29) and the Taconic State Parkway (via CR 21 or CR 42). CR 33 has an average daily traffic of about 5,000.

== Demographics ==
Historical population
Census	Pop.	Note	%±
2020	1,091		—
U.S. Decennial Census

As of the census of 2000, when the CDP was drawn to encompass 1.5 square miles (4.0 km^{2}), there were 2,022 people, 635 households, and 532 families residing in the CDP. The population density was 1,331.0 inhabitants per square mile (513.9/km^{2}). There were 659 housing units at an average density of 433.8 per square mile (167.5/km^{2}). The racial makeup of the CDP was 94.26% White, 1.73% African American, 0.20% Native American, 1.14% Asian, 0.54% from other races, and 2.13% from two or more races. Hispanic or Latino of any race were 3.07% of the population.

There were 635 households, out of which 51.8% had children under the age of 18 living with them, 74.6% were married couples living together, 6.3% had a female householder with no husband present, and 16.2% were non-families. 12.3% of all households were made up of individuals, and 4.6% had someone living alone who was 65 years of age or older. The average household size was 3.18 and the average family size was 3.52.

In the CDP, the population was spread out, with 33.2% under the age of 18, 5.6% from 18 to 24, 32.8% from 25 to 44, 21.7% from 45 to 64, and 6.6% who were 65 years of age or older. The median age was 35 years. For every 100 females, there were 98.2 males. For every 100 females age 18 and over, there were 98.5 males.

The median income for a household in the CDP was $71,344, and the median income for a family was $81,407. Males had a median income of $55,833 versus $26,912 for females. The per capita income for the CDP was $25,649. 0.9% of the population and less than 0.1% of families were below the poverty line. less than 0.1% of those under the age of 18 and 10.8% of those 65 and older were living below the poverty line.

== See also ==
- List of county routes in Dutchess County, New York
