= Willie Fraser =

American baseball player (born 1964)

- Pitcher
- Born: May 26, 1964 (age 61); New York City, New York, U.S.
- Batted: Right Threw: Right

Professional debut
- MLB: September 10, 1986, for the California Angels
- NPB: April 28, 1996, for the Orix BlueWave

Last appearance
- MLB: September 29, 1995, for the Montreal Expos
- NPB: September 24, 1998, for the Orix BlueWave

MLB statistics
- Win–loss record: 38–40
- Earned run average: 4.47
- Strikeouts: 328

NPB statistics
- Win–loss record: 25–16
- Earned run average: 4.10
- Strikeouts: 152
- Stats at Baseball Reference

Teams
- California Angels (1986–1990); Toronto Blue Jays (1991); St. Louis Cardinals (1991); Florida Marlins (1994); Montreal Expos (1995); Orix BlueWave (1996–1998)

Career highlights and awards
- Japan Series champion (1996)

William Patrick Fraser (born May 26, 1964) is an American former professional baseball pitcher. He pitched all or parts of eight seasons in Major League Baseball (MLB) between 1986 and 1995. Fraser played for the California Angels, Toronto Blue Jays, St. Louis Cardinals, Florida Marlins, and Montreal Expos. Following his major league career, he played for three seasons with the Orix BlueWave in Japan's Nippon Professional Baseball (NPB).

== Career ==
Fraser grew up a New York Yankees fan in Newburgh, New York, and graduated from Newburgh Free Academy in 1982. He played college baseball in NCAA Division II at Concordia College in Bronxville, New York, where he developed a forkball which drew comparisons to future Hall of Famer Bruce Sutter's. The California Angels selected him with the fifteenth pick in the 1985 MLB draft, ahead of future Hall of Famers Randy Johnson and John Smoltz. He was assigned to the Quad Cities Angels of the Midwest League to begin his professional career.

Fraser made his Major League debut in a start with the Angels on September 10, 1986, at Cleveland Stadium against the Indians. It was his only Major League appearance that year. He spent most of the next two seasons in the starting rotation then was moved to the bullpen after the Angels traded for future Baseball Hall of Fame pitcher Bert Blyleven following the 1988 season. He had led the league in home runs allowed in 1988.

After two years in California's bullpen, Fraser was traded to Toronto with Marcus Moore and Devon White in exchange for Junior Félix, Luis Sojo and a player to be named later. Fraser pitched in thirteen games for the Blue Jays before being placed on waivers and picked up by the St. Louis Cardinals where he finished the 1991 season. He spent all of 1992 and 1993 in Triple-A with the Edmonton Trappers and Toledo Mud Hens respectively. He returned to the majors in each of the following years with nine appearances for the Florida Marlins in 1994 and twenty-two with the Montreal Expos in 1995.

In 1996, Fraser began a three-year stint in Nippon Professional Baseball as a key addition to the Orix BlueWave. He won the second-most games for the club en route to a 1996 Japan Series victory led by Troy Neel and Ichiro Suzuki. He played in his last professional game on September 24, 1998, in Japan for Orix.

After retirement, Fraser worked for an independent company scouting players in Japan and the United States. He then became an advance scout for the Angels and, in 2014, began working as an advance scout for the Los Angeles Dodgers. In 2018, he was working as a scout for the Miami Marlins and conducting baseball clinics for children in places such as the Pine Ridge Indian Reservation in South Dakota, Ireland and Honduras. As of 2019, he was a scout for the Chicago Cubs. The Cubs parted ways with Fraser following the 2021 season.

== Personal life ==
As of 2015, Fraser lived in Hopewell Junction, New York. He and his wife, Jeannie, have two adult sons.
