= Dominick John Lagonegro =

American prelate

His Excellency, The Most Reverend Dominick John Lagonegro
- Auxiliary Bishop Emeritus of New York; Titular Bishop of Modruš
- Church: Roman Catholic Church
- Archdiocese: New York
- Appointed: October 30, 2001
- Installed: December 12, 2001
- Retired: July 2, 2018
- Other post: Titular Bishop of Modruš

Orders
- Ordination: May 31, 1969 by Terence Cooke
- Consecration: December 12, 2001 by Edward Egan, Henry J. Mansell, and Robert Anthony Brucato

Personal details
- Born: March 6, 1943 (age 83) White Plains, New York, US
- Motto: Christus primus (Christ first)

Styles of Dominick John Lagonegro
- Reference style: His Excellency; The Most Reverend
- Spoken style: Your Excellency
- Religious style: Bishop

Dominick John Lagonegro (born March 6, 1943) is an American prelate of the Roman Catholic Church. He served as an auxiliary bishop of the Archdiocese of New York from 2001 to 2018.

== Biography ==
=== Early life ===
An only child, Dominick Lagonegro was born on March 6, 1943, in White Plains, New York, to Dominick R. and Diamentina (née Morgado) Lagonegro, residents of Harrison, New York and members of St. Anthony of Padua Parish. His father's family had emigrated from Calabria in southern Italy, and his mother's family from Turquel in central Portugal.

Lagonegro studied at Cathedral Preparatory Seminary in Queens, New York, and later at St. Joseph's Seminary in Yonkers, New York. Lagonegro served as a deacon from 1968 to 1969 before his ordination.

=== Priesthood ===
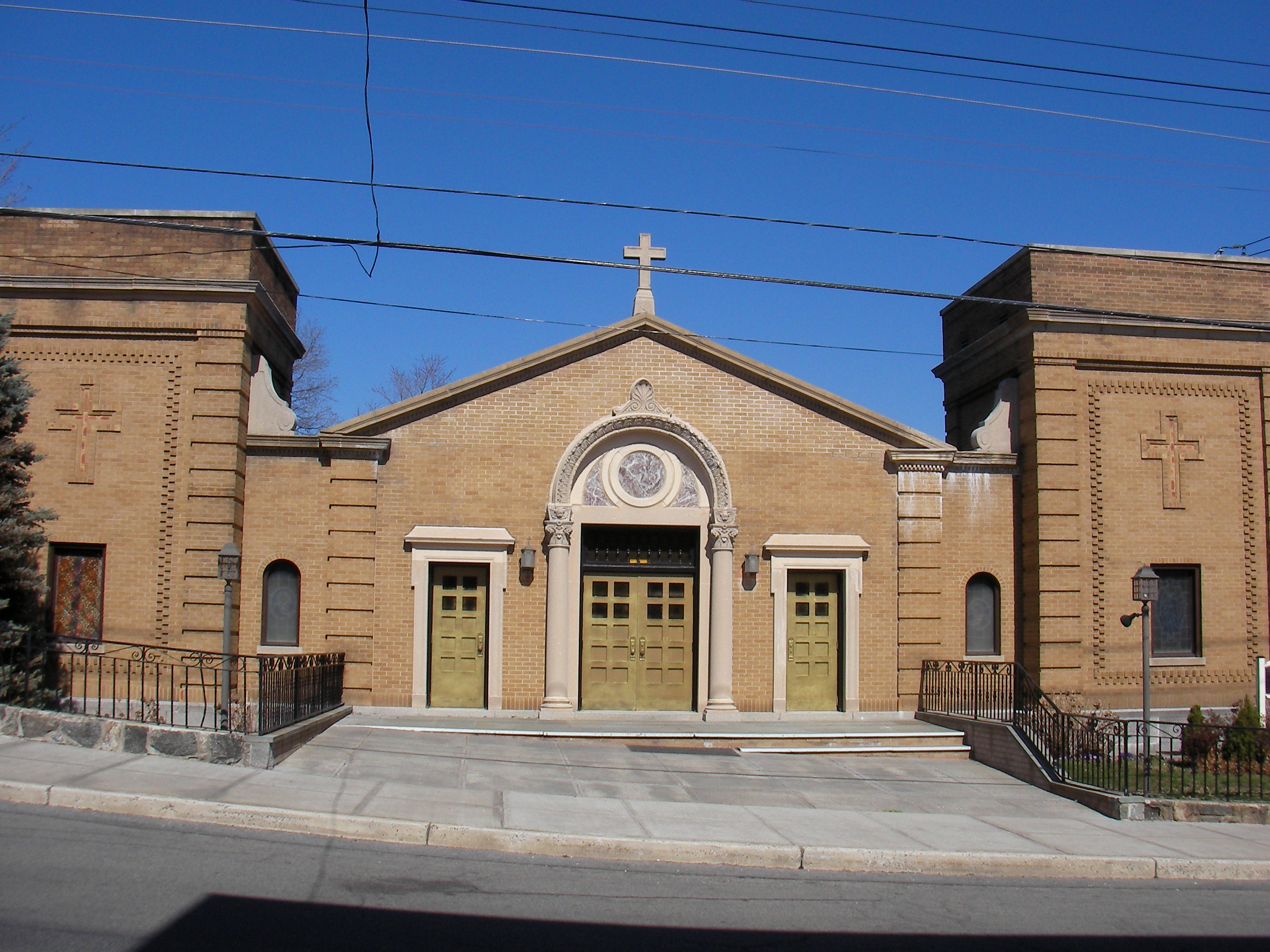
St. Vito's Church, Mamaroneck, New York (2009)

Lagonegro was ordained to the priesthood for the Archdiocese of New York by Cardinal Terence Cooke at St. Patrick's Cathedral in New York City on May 31, 1969. After his ordination, Lagonegro served as parochial vicar at St. Vito's Parish in Mamaroneck, New York. From 1977 to 1980, Lagonegro was assigned as parochial vicar at St. Joseph's Parish in Kingston, New York and taught at John A. Coleman Catholic High School in Hurley, New York. Lagonegro also served as parochial vicar at Holy Trinity Parish in Poughkeepsie, New York from 1980 to 1989.

Lagonegro was named pastor of Saints Denis and Columba Parish in Hopewell Junction, New York, in 1989, then became the founding pastor of St. Columba Parish after it and Saint Denis Parish split in 1992. He was raised by the Vatican to the rank of monsignor in 1994, and became vicar of Dutchess County in 1997.

=== Auxiliary Bishop of New York ===
On October 30, 2001, Lagonegro was appointed as an auxiliary bishop of the Archdiocese of New York and titular bishop of Modruš by Pope John Paul II. He received his episcopal consecration from Cardinal Edward Egan, with Bishops Henry Mansell and Robert Brucato serving as co-consecrators. He selected as his episcopal motto: Christus Primus, meaning, "Christ First."

In addition to his duties as an auxiliary bishop, Lagonegro serves as vicar of Orange County, episcopal liaison to the Catholic Chaplains Apostolate Committee in New York State, and the United States Conference of Catholic Bishops'(USCCB) liaison to the American Catholic Correctional Chaplains Association.

=== Retirement and legacy ===
On July 2, 2018, Pope Francis accepted Lagonegro's letter of resignation as auxiliary bishop of New York after reaching the mandatory retirement age of 75 for bishops.

== Viewpoints ==
=== Capital punishment ===
Lagonegro is an opponent of capital punishment. He made this statement in 2004:

"In our modern and civilized society, capital punishment is simply unwarranted and inconsistent with the Catholic Church’s vision of the sacred inviolable dignity of the human person, and the need to recognize the possibility of redemption and conversion. We seek a society of justice and peace, not vengeance and violence."

== See also ==
- Catholic Church hierarchy
- Catholic Church in the United States
- Historical list of the Catholic bishops of the United States
- List of Catholic bishops of the United States
- Lists of patriarchs, archbishops, and bishops

== Episcopal succession ==
Catholic Church titles
Preceded by –	Auxiliary Bishop of New York; 2001–2018	Succeeded by –
New creation	— TITULAR — Bishop of Modruš	Incumbent
