= Lucinda Franks =

American journalist (1946–2021)

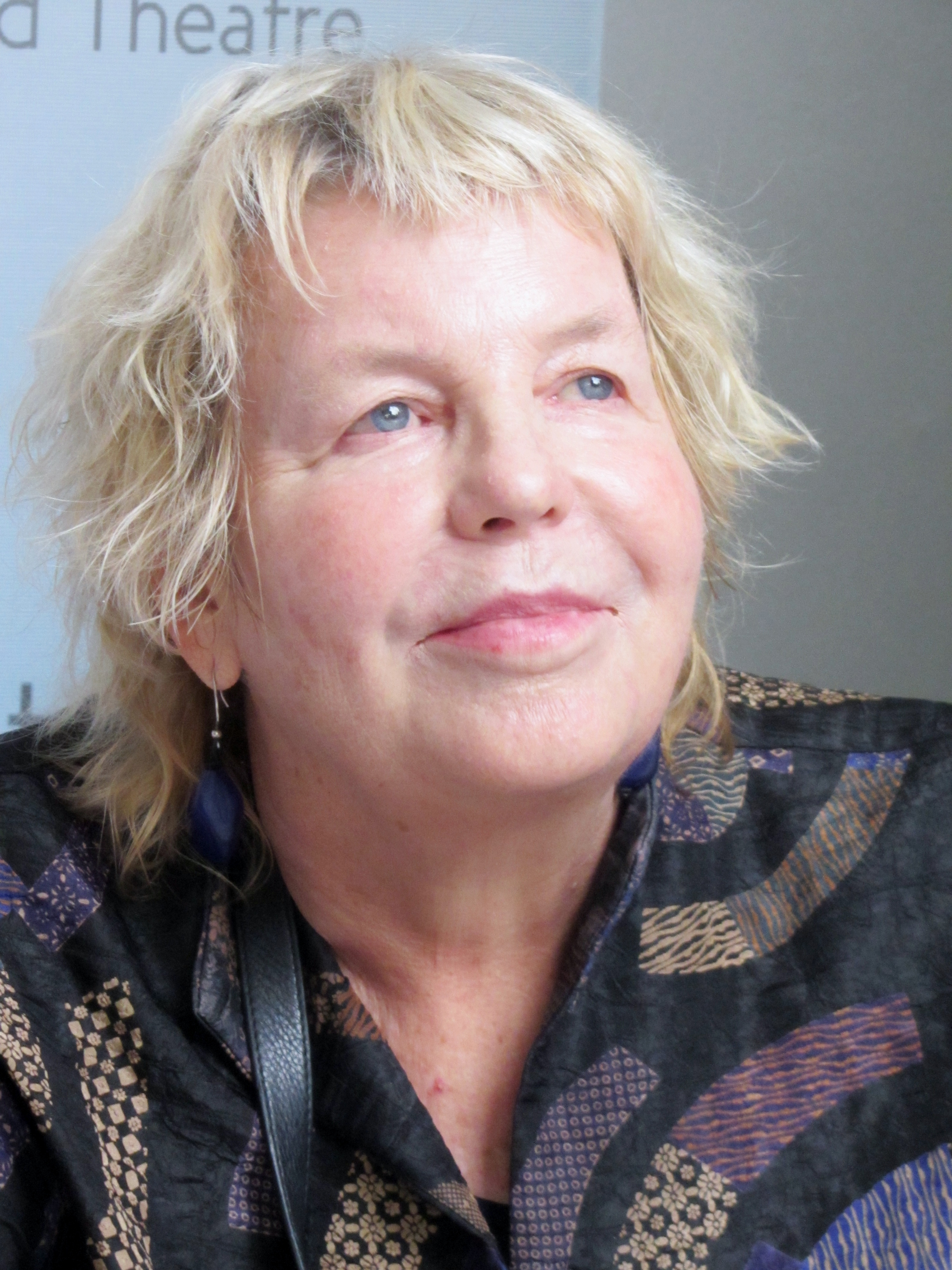
- Franks at the Miami Book Fair International, 2014
- Born: Lucinda Laura Franks; July 16, 1946; Chicago, Illinois, U.S.
- Died: May 5, 2021 (aged 74); Hopewell Junction, New York, U.S.
- Education: Vassar College (AB)
- Spouse: Robert Morgenthau (m. 1977; died 2019)
- Children: 2

Lucinda Laura Franks (July 16, 1946 – May 5, 2021) was an American journalist, novelist, and memoirist. Franks won a Pulitzer Prize in 1971 for her reporting on the life of Diana Oughton, a member of Weather Underground. With that award she became the first woman to win a Pulitzer for National Reporting, and the youngest person ever to win any Pulitzer. She published four books, including two memoirs, and worked as a staff writer at The New York Times (1974 to 1977) and The New Yorker (1992 to 2006).

== Early life and education ==
Lucinda Laura Franks was born on July 16, 1946, in Chicago. She was raised in a Christian family, the daughter of Lorraine Lois (Leavitt) and Thomas E. Franks, in Wellesley, Massachusetts. Franks attended high school at Beaver Country Day School and graduated from Vassar College in 1968 with a degree in English. While at Vassar, she cofounded a chapter of Students for a Democratic Society.

== Career ==
Franks began work at United Press International (UPI) in London in 1968, where she rose from making coffee to become the bureau's first female journalist. She was initially assigned to cover beauty pageants but went on her own time to Northern Ireland as civil war broke out. Her supervisor wanted to send a male reporter to replace her, citing UPI policy that female reporters were not allowed to cover war zones, but she persuaded him that the story would be over by the time a male replacement arrived, and she was allowed to continue her work.

On the strength of her work in Northern Ireland, Franks was transferred to New York City in 1970 to work on a story about the Weather Underground, which had accidentally exploded their facility for making bombs and killed several of their members. The resulting five-part story, written with Thomas Powers, on the life and death of Weather Underground member Diana Oughton, won the Pulitzer Prize for National Reporting in 1971. Then 24 years old, Franks was the youngest person to have won a Pulitzer. She was also the first woman to win the Pulitzer for National Reporting.

Franks left UPI in 1974, writing on staff at The New York Times for the next three years. From 1992 to 2006 she was on staff at The New Yorker. She also freelanced for New York, The New York Times Magazine, and The Atlantic, among other publications. She continued to find and report on high-profile stories, like a Michigan custody case where birth parents were seeking to regain custody of a three-year-old placed for adoption as a baby; Franks' New Yorker story was adapted as the 1993 television movie, Whose Child Is This? The War for Baby Jessica.

Franks's first book, Waiting Out a War: The Exile of Private John Picciano (1971), tells the story of a deserter in the Vietnam War. The work was based on reporting Franks had done at UPI. A review for Kirkus Reviews, calling Waiting Out a War a "book with more integrity than insight", emphasized how unremarkable Picciano's story was. Franks's next book was a novel published by Random House in 1991 titled Wild Apples. In it the death of the family matriarch leaves an apple orchard in the hands of rival sisters; a review in Publishers Weekly wrote that "Franks earnestly and perceptively confronts real emotional situations, rendering the sisters' relationship in highly credible fashion."

Late in her father Thomas's life, Franks discovered that he had been a secret agent for the US military during World War II, sent to pose as an officer of the SS and report on a subcamp of Buchenwald. Franks published a book about this and other discoveries about Thomas, titled My Father's Secret War: A Memoir, in 2007. The book draws from an extensive series of interviews Franks conducted with her father. Her second memoir, Timeless: Love, Morgenthau, and Me (2014), is about her marriage to Robert Morgenthau. In a review for The Wall Street Journal, Moira Hodgkin said, " 'Timeless' reads like a novel", remarking on "the astonishing candor with which Ms. Franks talks about their marital ups and downs," though ultimately more up than down: the book, Hodgson said, was "a long love letter to [Morgenthau]."

== Personal life ==
In 1977, Franks married longtime district attorney for New York County, Robert Morgenthau. Franks met Morgenthau in 1973, when she interviewed him for a story about corruption in the Nixon administration. They had two children. Morgenthau died in 2019 at the age of 99.

One of the Supersisters trading cards, produced in 1979, featured Franks's name and picture.

Franks died of cancer on May 5, 2021, in Hopewell Junction, New York, aged 74.

== Publications ==
- Waiting Out a War: The Exile of Private John Picciano. Coward, McCann & Geoghegan. 1974. ISBN 0-698-10463-3. OCLC 857714.
- Wild Apples. Random House. 1991. ISBN 0-394-57578-4. OCLC 22389489.
- My Father's Secret War: A Memoir. Miramax Books. 2007. ISBN 978-1-4013-5226-4. OCLC 78792493.
- Timeless: Love, Morgenthau, and Me. New York: Farrar, Straus and Giroux. 2014. ISBN 978-0-374-28080-2. OCLC 876367939.
