= Troy Neel =

American baseball player (born 1965)

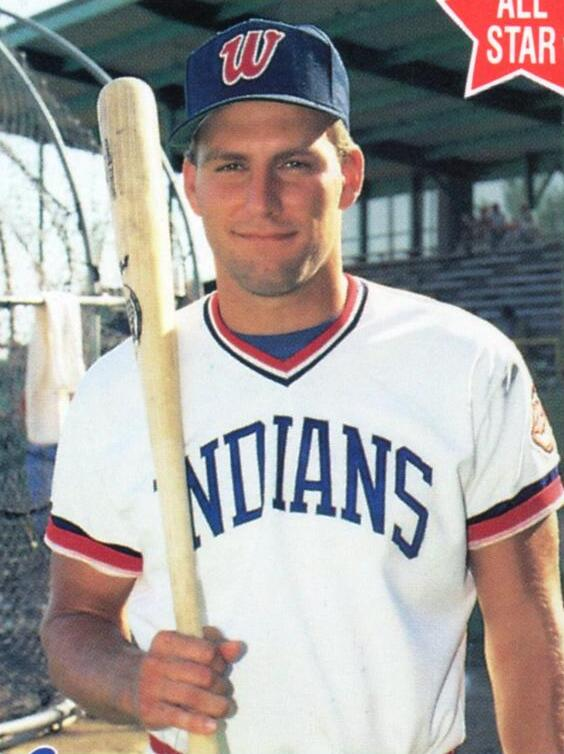
- Neel with the Waterloo Indians c. 1988
- Designated hitter / First baseman
- Born: September 14, 1965 (age 61); Freeport, Texas, U.S.
- Batted: Left Threw: Right

Professional debut
- MLB: May 30, 1992, for the Oakland Athletics
- NPB: April 1, 1995, for the Orix BlueWave

Last appearance
- MLB: August 11, 1994, for the Oakland Athletics
- NPB: August 24, 2000, for the Orix BlueWave

MLB statistics
- Batting average: .280
- Home runs: 37
- Runs batted in: 120

NPB statistics
- Batting average: .262
- Home runs: 137
- Runs batted in: 438

KBO statistics
- Batting average: .193
- Home runs: 1
- Runs batted in: 3
- Stats at Baseball Reference

Teams
- Oakland Athletics (1992–1994); Orix BlueWave (1995–1997, 1998–2000); Doosan Bears (2001)

Career highlights and awards
- Japan Series champion (1996); Japan Series MVP (1996)

Troy Lee Neel (born September 14, 1965) is an American former professional baseball player. After a solid start in Major League Baseball (MLB), Neel moved to Japan and compiled strong numbers in six seasons playing in Nippon Professional Baseball (NPB).

== Early life ==
Neel was born in Freeport, Texas. Troy attend Brazoswood High School and started on the baseball team that won the 1984 UIL Texas High School 5A state championship. He attended Texas A&M University before his professional baseball career. At the time, Neel was planning on being a linebacker as part of the famed Wrecking Crew defense. After one season, he missed baseball and transferred to Howard College to get back into baseball.

== Career ==
Initially, Neel was drafted by the Cleveland Indians in the 9th round of the 1986 MLB draft, before being traded to Oakland in 1991, where he made his Major League debut.

Neel played in the major leagues for the Oakland Athletics primarily as a first baseman and designated hitter from 1992 to 1994. He made his debut on May 30 against the Baltimore Orioles, hitting second in the lineup and playing the entire game in left field. He went 0 for 4 with 2 strike outs. His first Major League hit was as a pinch hitter off reliever Bobby Thigpen of the Chicago White Sox on June 5 and his first career home run came on July 6 against Jeff Muttis of the Cleveland Indians. That game was his best of the year, going 3 for 5 with a 2-run home run, a double and 3 runs scored. By the end of the season he saw action in 24 games, hitting for a .264 batting average (14 hits in 53 at bats), with 3 home runs and 9 runs batted in, playing first base, left field and designated hitter. In 1993 Neel became a first-string player, belting 19 home runs with 63 RBI's on a solid .290 average. The following year his playing time was a bit reduced to 83 games, yet he still provided punch with 15 HR and 48 RBI's. Unexpectedly that would turn out to be his last year in the majors. He finished with a career .280 average in 758 at bats.

Moving to Japan alongside teammate Doug Jennings, he had a successful baseball career for the Orix BlueWave, playing with them for six seasons from 1995 until 1998, before signing with the Anaheim Angels and being assigned to the Triple-A Vancouver Canadians in that year, before returning to Japan on April 30 the same year and playing there until 2000. He also was able to make fast friends with then future MLB stars Ichiro Suzuki and So Taguchi.

Neel was the Most Valuable Player in the 1996 Japan Series, as the BlueWave defeated the Yomiuri Giants 4-games-to-1. Neel had 6 RBI in the Series.

Neel finished his professional baseball career in 2001 playing with the Doosan Bears in Korea. He was cut midway through the season after both putting up bad numbers, and a barfight that involved him getting arrested. The Bears would end up winning that year's Korean Series without him.

== Personal life ==
=== Child support controversy ===
In 2000, Neel was ordered by the State of Texas to pay $5,000 a month in child support to his ex-wife who is the mother of his two children, a son and daughter. Instead of paying, Neel fled the country then rejoined his former team in Japan, the Orix BlueWave.

After retiring from baseball after being cut midway through the 2001 season, the remarried Neel purchased a 16-acre 700,000 ft^{2} (65,000 m^{2}) island in Vanuatu in the South Pacific, where he and his wife ran a 21-room resort which cost a reported $1.5 million overlooking a lagoon. He chose to live there because since Vanuatu did not have any extradition treaties with the United States, this would allow him to stay there for at least five years, then gain citizenship there so he would not have to pay his ex-wife anything. Called "the worst dead beat dad in 'the history of Texas'", he owed over $725,000 in child support, ultimately determined to be $778,000. In 2005, a grand jury in San Antonio indicted Neel on a charge of foreign travel to evade child support obligations. They were not able to do much about it, since Neel was still living in Vanuatu at the time, but this allowed the authorities on the island to not give him a Vanuatuan passport, and therefore, proper citizenship into the island.

His passport expired in 2008, and Vanuatu authorities forced him to leave the country. On December 11, 2008, Neel was arrested at the Los Angeles International Airport by US Health and Human Services investigators after he exited a plane from Sydney, Australia; he awaited trial in San Antonio, Texas. On May 7, 2009, Neel was scheduled to plead guilty in court to avoiding child support payments. Neel faced as much as two years in federal prison and a $250,000 fine.

Neel reached a one-lump settlement with his ex-wife, for $116,000 and not the $778,000 he owed, a reduction of 85%. He received no jail time sentence, only probation.
