= Kieran Lalor =

American politician

Member of the New York State Assembly from the 105th district
- In office January 1, 2013 – December 31, 2022
- Preceded by: George Amedore
- Succeeded by: Anil Beephan Jr.

Personal details
- Born: Kieran Michael Lalor; January 23, 1976 (age 50) Poughkeepsie, New York, U.S.
- Party: Republican
- Spouse: Mary Jo Lalor
- Children: 3
- Education: Providence College (BA); Pace University (JD)
- Awards: Marine Corps Achievement Medal; National Defense Service Medal; Iraq Campaign Medal; Global War on Terrorism Service Medal; Selected Marine Corps Reserve Medal Combat Action Ribbon
- Website: Official website

Military service
- Years of service: 2001–2007
- Rank: Corporal (USMC)
- Battles/wars: Iraq War; Katrina disaster relief

Kieran Michael Lalor (born January 23, 1976) is an American politician, entrepreneur and author who founded Iraq Vets for Congress (a political action committee). He works in the defense industry, and is a former social studies teacher, and a U.S. Marine Corps veteran of the Iraq War. Lalor was a member of the New York State Assembly, representing the 105th district.

Lalor was the Republican candidate in New York's 19th congressional district election of 2008 but lost to incumbent John Hall. Lalor is a resident of Fishkill, New York.

In November 2010 Lalor published a book about Marine Corps boot camp called, This Recruit: A First Hand Account of Marine Corps Boot Camp Written While Knee Deep in Mayhem.

== Early career and background ==
Lalor graduated from Providence College. He then worked as a social studies teacher at Our Lady of Lourdes High School in Poughkeepsie.

Lalor enlisted in the United States Marine Corps Reserve in July 2000 and thereafter served as a U.S. Marine Corps reservist. At basic training, he was the second oldest recruit in his platoon. He later enrolled at Pace University School of Law, but left school when his reserve infantry unit was called to active service after the September 11 attacks on the World Trade Center in 2001, with Lalor training at Camp Lejeune, North Carolina as part of a "ready reaction force." Lalor's unit was demobilized in December 2002 but was activated again in March 2003 and deployed to Iraq. While in Iraq, Lalor's unit participated in security and humanitarian operations in the city of Nasiriyah, located along the Euphrates River in southern Iraq.

Upon his return from Iraq, Lalor returned to the Pace University School of Law and graduated in 2007. His six-year military obligation ended in 2006, and Lalor achieved the rank of Corporal.

=== Iraq Vets for Congress (IVC) ===
Lalor founded Iraq Vets for Congress, a group of Republican congressional candidates who served in Iraq. On behalf of the group, Lalor addressed the National Press Club in April 2008

=== 2008 congressional campaign ===
Lalor declared his candidacy for the U.S. House of Representatives in November 2007 and was the first candidate to file paperwork as a candidacy for the 2008 race. Lalor won a District-wide Republican convention held in Mahopac, New York on May 22, 2008, prevailing over former Congressman Joseph DioGuardi and County legislator George Oros. Lalor won 347 votes, Oros received 311, and DioGuardi received 102. Oros vowed to wage a primary challenge but subsequently withdrew from the race. (Businessman Andrew Saul, a Bush appointee as Chairman of the Federal Retirement Thrift Investment Board and a board member of the New York Metropolitan Transportation Authority (MTA), also ran, but withdrew from the race for the Republican nomination in November 2007).

As of his October 15 report, Saul had raised more than $781,000 for the race, outraising the incumbent, while Lalor had raised less than $30,000, leading pundits to question his viability as a candidate in an election year where the Republican party is looking for candidates who self-finance.

In connection with his campaign, Lalor appeared on radio and television programs, including Fox News Channel and was described as "proud to call himself a Reagan Republican"; he believed a conservative candidate would have the best chance of unseating Democratic incumbent John Hall. Lalor criticizing former Governor George Pataki for his endorsement of Oros, and was an outspoken critic of Hall.

On November 4, 2008, Hall won by 59% to Lalor's 41%.

=== 2012 New York State Assembly campaign ===
Lalor officially kicked off his campaign for the 105th Assembly district in New York on May 11, 2012, on the radio station 101.5 WPDH on the Coop and Mulrooney morning show.

Lalor defeated Patrick Manning and Richard Wager in the Republican primary race, taking 52% of the vote to Manning's 28% and Wager's 20%. In the general election of November 2012, Lalor defeated Democratic challenger Paul F. Curran, gaining 56% of the vote to Curran's 44%.

=== New York State Assembly ===
Lalor was sworn into the New York State Assembly on January 9, 2013.

Lalor voted No on NYS Assembly Bill A02562 that "Requires hospitals to establish policies and procedures regarding domestic violence; establishes ongoing training programs on domestic violence for all current and new hospital employees; designates a hospital staff member to coordinate services to victims; provides for the interaction of hospitals with community domestic violence service providers in order to coordinate services to victims of domestic violence; requires hospitals to offer to contact a local advocate when admitting or treating a confirmed or suspected victim of domestic violence."

In 2018, Lalor received an 88 percent rating from the American Conservative Union, rating him as the second most conservative member of the Assembly for the year.

== Electoral history ==
New York State Assembly 105th District - 2012
Party	Candidate	Votes	%	±%
Republican	Kieran Michael Lalor	29,664	55.7%	
Democratic	Paul F. Curran	23,556	44.3%	

New York State Assembly 105th District - 2014
Party	Candidate	Votes	%	±%
Republican	Kieran Michael Lalor	22,731	65.49%	
Democratic	Joseph Torres	11,953	34.44%	

New York State Assembly 105th District - 2016
Party	Candidate	Votes	%	±%
Republican	Kieran Michael Lalor	35,790	62.49%	
Democratic	Joseph Torres	21,471	37.50%	

New York State Assembly 105th District - 2018
Party	Candidate	Votes	%	±%
Republican	Kieran Michael Lalor	29,487	57.41%	
Democratic	Laurette Giardino	21,878	42.59%	

Political offices
Preceded by George Amedore	New York Assembly, 105th District; 2013–present	Incumbent
