= St. Denis Church (Hopewell Junction, New York) =

Church of St. Denis
- Church of St. Denis
- 41°35′51.7″N 73°44′52.8″W
- Location: 602 Beekman Road, Hopewell Junction, New York
- Denomination: Roman Catholic
- Website: St. Denis Church

History
- Status: Parish church
- Founded: 1899
- Dedication: Saint Denis

Architecture
- Functional status: Active

Administration
- Archdiocese: Archdiocese of New York

St. Denis Church is a Roman Catholic parish church under the authority of the Roman Catholic Archdiocese of New York, located in Hopewell Junction, Dutchess County, New York. It was established in 1899 as a parish; it had previously been established a mission of St. Mary in Wappingers Falls.

== History ==
=== Background ===
The first Priests in the Hudson Valley were French Jesuits, led by Saint Isaac Jogues, who about forty years earlier preached the Gospel to the Indians in the Mohawk Valley. It is believed that Father Jogues traveled through what later became Dutchess County before he and his companions were captured and martyred at Auriesville in 1646. Father Ferdinand Farmer reported visiting Dutchess County in October 1781. His records mention Fishkill where he baptized 14 Canadian and Acadian Catholics. He again visited the area in November 1783.

The founding of the church of St. Denis on Beekman Road was connected with Daniel DeLaney. Born in County Kilkenny, Ireland in 1801, history has it that DeLaney, at some time prior to 1852, arrived in Beekman, evidently as a farm hand in the vicinity of Sylvan Lake and observed iron ore, which he recognized by virtue of having worked in an iron mine in Ireland. He purchased land around Sylvan Lake and went into iron mining. To obtain workers for his mine, DeLaney periodically traveled to New York City where he recruited Irish immigrants straight off the boat and brought them to Sylvan Lake. Soon the miners had wives and children and the colony of Catholics in Beekman started to grow.

=== Mission church ===
In 1858 or 1860, DeLaney donated a plot of land and, with the assistance of his miners, the first St. Denis was built on a knoll on Beekman Road just over the line in East Fishkill. St. Denis became a mission church of St. Mary's in Wappinger Falls which had itself been founded in 1845. Father George Brophy, its first resident pastor, served not only the parishioners of St. Mary's but also the workers at the "ore beds" at Sylvan Lake as well as the Catholics at Fishkill Landing. The territory served by St. Denis included all of the land East of Wappinger Falls to the Connecticut line, running from the parish of Mattewan on the South to Amenia on the North. By 1909, the parish of St. Denis had churches at Sylvan Lake, Hopewell Junction and Clove, as well as stations at Moores Mills and Poughquag. A station was likely a private home where Mass was said from time to time.

In the "History of Dutchess County 1660-1909", Father William Patrick Eagen reports that in 1874 Father McSwiggan had two assistants, Rev. W.H. Murthy and Rev. Charles McMullen who served mission churches at Pawling and Dover, both of which later became full parishes. By 1983, St. Denis parish, including its mission church of St. Columba in Hopewell Junction, encompassed over 200 square miles and ranked as one of the largest parishes in the Archdiocese.

The average attendance at Mass at St. Denis was 109, the average at Our Lady of Mercy at Clove was 31 and 35 at Hopewell Junction. He reported that the farmers would not drive their horses to church when the weather was inclement since there was no shelter for the "poor beasts", nor a way of keeping the conveyances dry. It appears that the sheds were built.

== Parish of St. Denis ==
In 1899 St. Denis ceased being a mission and became a full-fledged parish. In 1935 calamity struck when "the church at Sylvan Lake", then 75 years old, caught fire. The building erected through the efforts of Daniel DeLaney was a total loss. By June 14, 1936, the new St. Denis was dedicated by Cardinal Patrick Hayes. The building cost $16,000 and has room for 300. The new church was an old English design with cast stone trim and brick walls. Newspaper accounts said that the pews came from St. Peter's in Poughkeepsie and that they were over 100 years old. They have since been replaced.

== Pastors ==
- 1860–1874 Fr. Denis Sheehan
- 1874–1877 Fr. Patrick J. Healy
- 1877–1884 Fr. W.J. McSwiggan
- 1884–1892 Fr. Charles McMullen
- 1892–1896 Fr. Edward J. Byrnes
- 1896–1901 Fr. Eugene A. Shine
- 1901–1903 Fr. Andrew Corsini Mearns
- 1903–1905 Fr. John C. McEvoy
- 1905–1910 Fr. William P. Egan
- 1910–1915 Fr. James Corridan
- 1915–1917 Fr. James MacDonnell
- 1917–1921 Fr. John P. Hines
- 1921–1928 Fr. Edward L. Baxter
- 1928–1936 Fr. Francis E. McElhinney
- 1936–1940 Fr. James A. Dunnigan
- 1940–1945 Fr. Thomas B. Brown
- 1945–1947 Fr. Andrew F. Carney
- 1948–1958 Fr. Florian G. Wermuth
- 1958–1959 Fr. Francis X. Harper
- 1959–1963 Fr. William J. Brady
- 1963–1968 Fr. Joseph F. Tracy
- 1968–1973 Fr. John J. Gannon
- 1973–1976 Fr. William J. McGann
- 1976–1989 Fr. Joseph Meehan
- 1989–1993 Msgr. Dominick J. Lagonegro
- 1993–2008 Fr. William B. Cosgrove
- 2008–2010 Fr. Stephen P. Norton
- 2010–2012 Fr. Vincent DePaul Howley
- 2012–2021 Fr. Robert Porpora
- 2021– Fr. Andrew Carrozza
