= Paul Panik =

American baseball coach and former catcher

Current position
- Title: Assistant coach
- Team: Old Dominion
- Conference: Sun Belt

Biographical details
- Born: June 7, 1988 (age 37); Yonkers, New York

Playing career
- 2007–2010: Canisius
- Position(s): Catcher

Coaching career (HC unless noted)
- 2012: Western Connecticut State (asst.)
- 2013: Butler (asst.)
- 2014: Niagara (asst.)
- 2015–2016: Canisius (asst.)
- 2017: Iona (asst.)
- 2018: Albany (asst.)
- 2019–2021: Iona
- 2022–2024: William & Mary (H)
- 2025-Present: Old Dominion (H/RC)

Head coaching record
- Overall: 20–61
- Tournaments: MAAC: 0–0; NCAA: 0–0

Paul Panik Jr. (born June 7, 1988) is an American college baseball coach and former catcher, who is currently an assistant baseball coach at the College of William and Mary. Panik played college baseball at Canisius College for coach Mike McRae from 2007 to 2010. He then served as the head coach of the Iona Gaels (2019–2021).

== Playing career ==
Panik attended John Jay High School in Hopewell Junction, New York, and played for the school's varsity baseball team for three years. Panik then enrolled at Canisius College, where he played college baseball for the Canisius Golden Griffins baseball team.

As a freshman at Canisius College in 2007, Panik had a .214 batting average, a .391 on-base percentage (OBP) and a .271 SLG.

As a sophomore in 2008, Panik batted .294 with a .510 SLG, 3 home runs, and 11 RBIs.

In the 2009 season as a junior, Panik hit 3 doubles and had 11 RBIs.

Panik had his best season as a senior in 2010, hitting a career high in doubles (7), home runs (5), RBIs (33) and a .481 SLG.

== Coaching career ==
In 2013, Panik spent the season on the Butler Bulldogs baseball staff. In 2014, he joined the Niagara Purple Eagles baseball staff. In late 2014, Panik was named an assistant coach at his alma mater, Canisius College. After two years at Canisius, Panik joined the Iona Gaels baseball staff. Panik accepted a job as the assistant coach of the Albany Great Danes baseball program.

On June 25, 2018, Panik was named the head coach of the Iona program. Just three seasons later, Panik and Iona mutually agreed to part ways.

Panik reunited with Mike McRae in 2022, joining his staff at William & Mary.

In 2025 Panik move to the ODU coaching staff taking over a Hitting Coach and Recruiting Coordinator.

== Head coaching record ==
Statistics overview
| Season | Team | Overall | Conference | Standing | Postseason |
|---|---|---|---|---|---|
Iona Gaels (Metro Atlantic Athletic Conference) (2019–2021)
| 2019 | Iona | 14–38 | 8–16 | T-9th | |
| 2020 | Iona | 3–12 | 0–0 | | Season canceled due to COVID-19 |
| 2021 | Iona | 3–11 | 3–11 | 11th | |
| Iona: | | 20–61 | 11–27 | | |
| Total: | | 20–61 | | | |
National champion Postseason invitational champion Conference regular season champion Conference regular season and conference tournament champion Division regular season champion Division regular season and conference tournament champion Conference tournament champion

== Personal life ==
Paul is the elder brother of Major League Baseball (MLB) infielder Joe Panik.
