= New York State Bicycle Route System =

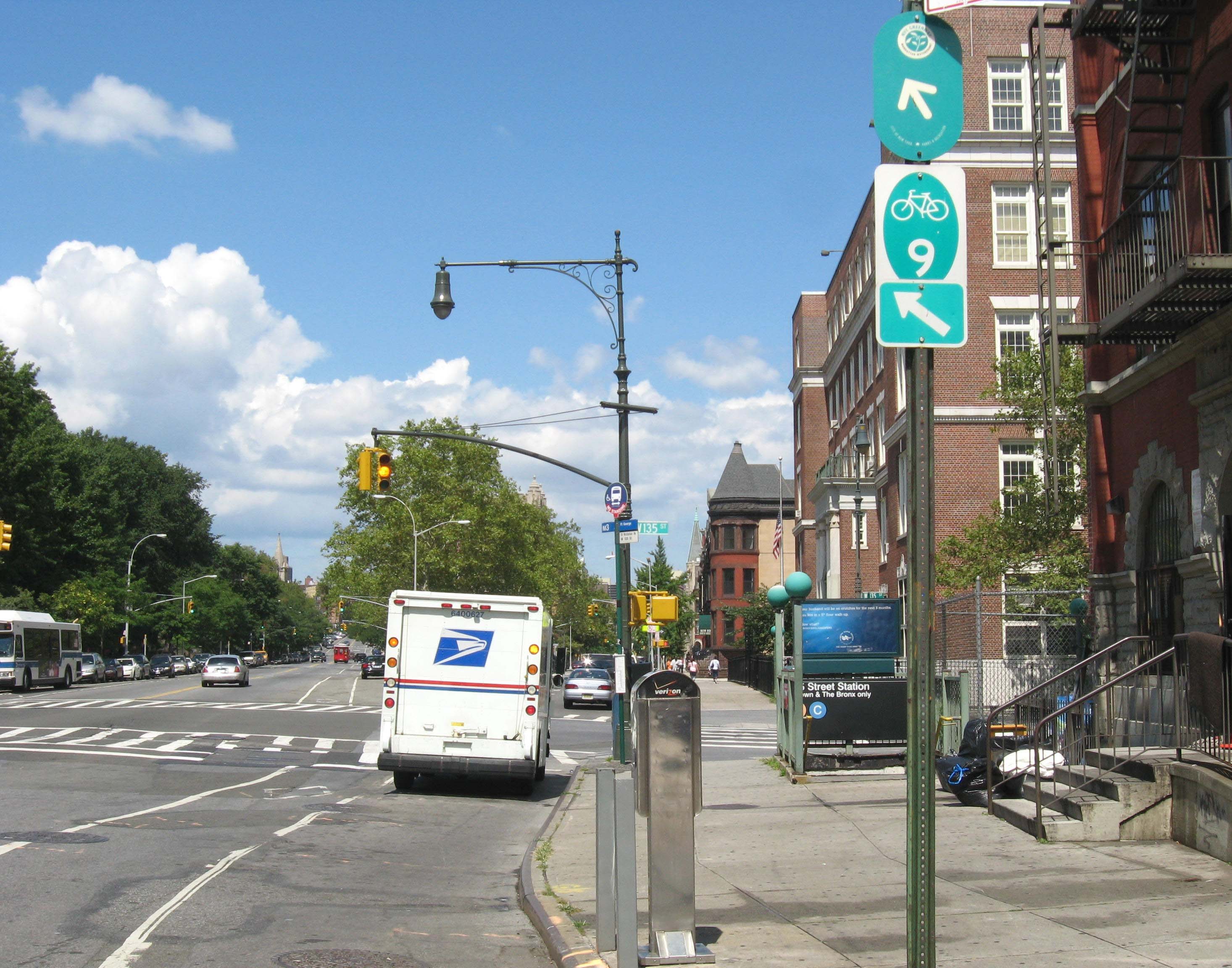
Bicycle Route 9 along Saint Nicholas Avenue in New York City

== Development of New York State Bicycle Route System ==
In the early 1990s, the New York State Department of Transportation (NYSDOT) created the state's first full-time bicycle and pedestrian program. Utilizing funding provided by the federal Intermodal Surface Transportation Efficiency Act (ISTEA) of 1991. Lou Rossi, as Director of the NYSDOT Transportation Planning Division, played a central role in getting the program started, and hired Jeff Olson as NYSDOT Statewide Bicycle and Pedestrian Program Manager.

In the first year of the program, Rossi proposed that NYSDOT establish a signed network of on-road bike routes across the state as a catalyst for becoming a more bicycle-friendly state. Working with the support of NYSDOT Commissioner John Egan, he collaborated with all 11 NYSDOT Regions and 13 Metropolitan Planning Organizations (MPOs) to define the potential routes. The top priorities were to establish a route from Albany to Buffalo to complement the developing Erie Canalway Trail (and to provide interim connections for gaps in the trail), and to sign a route from New York City to Montreal along the Hudson and Champlain Valleys.

The routes were numbered to align with the existing state highways that crossed the state, but were located on a combination of roadways that provided the best available conditions for bicyclists. The east-west route became known as Bike Route 5, and the north-south route was designated Bike Route 9. In an effort that brought together communities across the state, more than 1,000 miles of signage for both routes 5 and 9 was installed within two years by teams of NYSDOT staff. A cross-state celebration ride was held in the summer of 1994, with teams of riders carrying water from the Hudson River and Niagara Falls to meet at Sylvan Beach in the middle of the state. (photo provided)

By 1996, NYSDOT adopted the first Statewide Bicycle and Pedestrian Plan, which included a mapped network of signed routes connecting across the entire state. The route network was implemented over time, and NYSDOT provided maps of the system. For many years, the map for the Erie Canalway Trail included both the off-road trail and the on-road connections along Bike Route 5. New York became one of the first states to have a system of this kind, and it became one of the predecessors of the National Bike Route system currently being advanced by Adventure Cycling, AASHTO and others. The success of the NY State Bike Route system led to decades of projects across the state, including completion of the Empire State Trail in December 2020.

== Rossi Junction ==
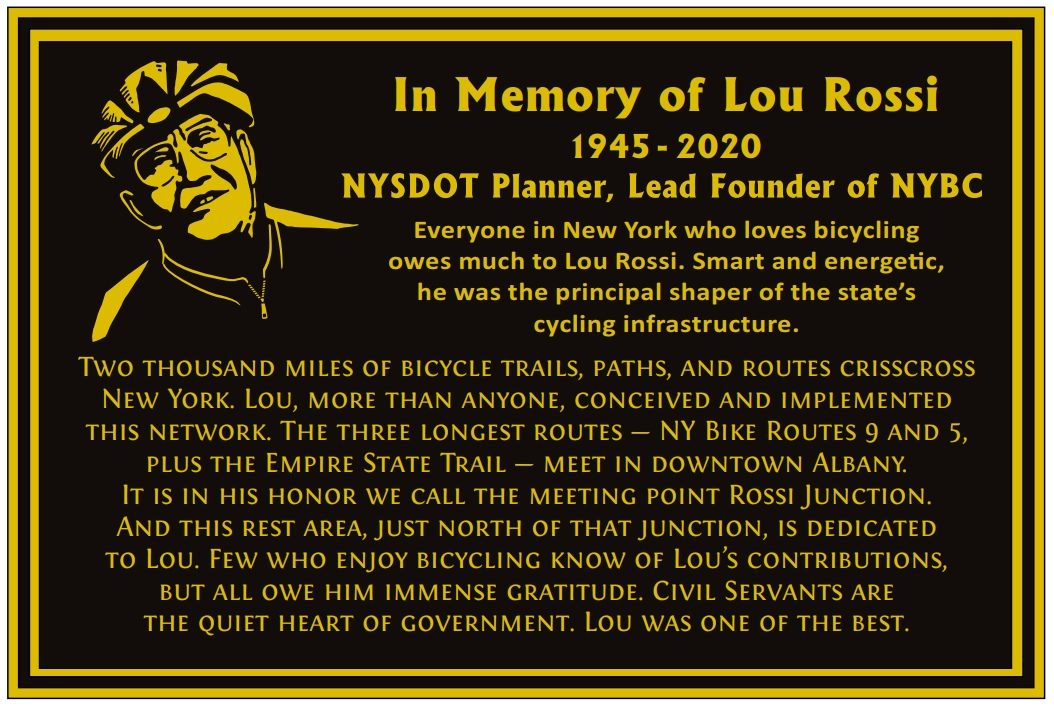

The two longest cross-state routes, the east-west Bike Route 5 and the north-south Bike Route 9, intersect in downtown Albany. They meet alongside the Hudson River. This emblematic point is known as Rossi Junction. A rest area here was dedicated to the late Lou Rossi. He was a committed civil servant who, more than anyone, was instrumental in bringing about the State’s system of signed bike routes. He typified the dedicated state workers who work and live in Albany.

== List of routes ==
The following is a list of New York State bicycle routes. These routes are designated by the New York State Department of Transportation.

=== State Bicycle Route 5 ===
New York State Bicycle Route 5
- Location: Niagara Falls–New Lebanon

New York State Bicycle Route 5

New York State Bicycle Route 5 runs from Niagara Falls east to the Massachusetts border in New Lebanon. The route passes through the communities of Niagara Falls (with a spur to Buffalo), Lockport, Middleport, Albion, Rochester, Lyons, Baldwinsville, Rome, Utica, Herkimer, Amsterdam, Rotterdam, Schenectady, Albany, and Rensselaer. It overlaps State Bicycle Route 9 over the Dunn Memorial Bridge over the Hudson River.

=== State Bicycle Route 9 ===
New York State Bicycle Route 9
- Location: New York City–Rouses Point

New York State Bicycle Route 9

New York State Bicycle Route 9 runs from New York City north to the border with Canada in Rouses Point. The route begins at Central Park in Harlem, Manhattan, crosses the George Washington Bridge and follows U.S. Route 9W (US 9W) through a portion of New Jersey before entering New York again in Palisades. The route passes through Nyack, Haverstraw, and then Bear Mountain State Park, where it crosses the Bear Mountain Bridge to move onto New York State Route 9D. Before reaching Downtown Cold Spring, NYS Bike Route 9 leaves NY 9D and moves onto Putnam CR 16 (Pekskill Road) overlapping the entire route until it terminates at New York State Route 301 then turns east to overlap NY 301 until it reaches U.S. Route 9. Finally running along its parent route, NYS Bicycle Route 9 passes through Fishkill, Wappingers Falls (where in intersects State Bicycle Route 17), Poughkeepsie (where in intersects State Bicycle Route 44), Rhinebeck(where in intersects State Bicycle Route 308), Red Hook(where in intersects State Bicycle Route 199), Hudson(where in intersects State Bicycle Route 23), Rensselaer, Albany (where it intersects State Bicycle Route 5), Troy, Waterford, Fort Edward, Hudson Falls, Adirondack Park, and Plattsburgh.

=== State Bicycle Route 11 ===
New York State Bicycle Route 11
- Location: Conklin–Lisle; Ellisburg–Rouses Point

New York State Bicycle Route 11 runs north / south in two segments. The southern segment runs from Pennsylvania border in Conklin where it connects to BicyclePA Route L, north to the border of Broome and Cortland counties in Lisle, passing through Binghamton.

The northern segment runs from the border of Oswego and Jefferson counties in Ellisburg north to the border with Canada in Rouses Point, passing through Watertown, Canton, Potsdam, and Malone. At the north end it connects to Vélo Québec Quebec Route Verte No.2.

=== State Bicycle Route 14 ===
New York State Bicycle Route 14
- Location: Geneva–Sodus Point

New York State Bicycle Route 14 runs from the border of Yates and Ontario counties in Geneva north to Sodus Point, passing through Lyons. The route is concurrent with USBR 11.

=== State Bicycle Route 17 ===
New York State Bicycle Route 17
- Location: Westfield–Wappingers Falls

New York State Bicycle Route 17 runs from Westfield east to State Bicycle Route 9 in Wappingers Falls. The route passes through Mayville, where it splits into two branches alongside Chautauqua Lake that join again in Jamestown. From here, the route passes through Salamanca, Allegany State Park, Olean, Wellsville, Bath, Corning, Elmira, Waverly, Binghamton, Hancock, Port Jervis, Middletown, Newburgh, and Beacon.

New York State Bicycle Route 17 generally follows NY 17, although it runs primarily on former segments such as NY 394, NY 430, NY 242, NY 353, NY 417, NY 21, two Steuben County Roads, with local roads in between, NY 415, NY 414, NY 352. However, in Delaware County, it heads northeast onto NY 10, then south onto NY 268 and then to NY 97, then east to U.S. Route 6 to NY 207, briefly taking U.S. Route 9W before turning onto the Newburgh–Beacon Bridge, only to move north onto NY 9D.

=== State Bicycle Route 19 ===
New York State Bicycle Route 19
- Location: Pike–Hamlin Beach State Park

New York State Bicycle Route 19 runs from the border of Allegany and Wyoming counties in Pike north to Hamlin Beach State Park, passing through Warsaw, Le Roy, Bergen, Brockport, and Hamlin.

=== State Bicycle Route 22 ===
New York State Bicycle Route 22
- Location: Brewster–New Lebanon

New York State Bicycle Route 22 runs from Brewster north to New Lebanon, passing through Pawling, Wassaic, and Austerlitz.

=== State Bicycle Route 23 ===
New York State Bicycle Route 23
- Location: Rip Van Winkle Bridge–Copake

New York State Bicycle Route 23 runs from the Rip Van Winkle Bridge east to the Massachusetts border in Copake, passing through Greenport, Claverack, and Hillsdale.

=== State Bicycle Route 24 ===
New York State Bicycle Route 24
- Location: Riverhead–Hampton Bays

New York State Bicycle Route 24 runs along New York State Route 24 (NY 24), from CR 104 at the Riverhead Traffic Circle, eastward to Old Riverhead Road in Hampton Bays. Originally, Bike Route 24 extended east of NY 24 proper to run along Old Riverhead Road where it briefly joined Squiretown Road beneath the NY 27 bridge, and before returning to Old Riverhead Road to terminate at Montauk Highway in Hampton Bays. This segment is now part of the Old Riverhead/Squiretown Road Bike Route under the supervision of the Town of Southampton, and was extended south along the rest of Squiretown Road into Ponquogue Avenue (Suffolk CR 32) to its southern terminus at the shared termini of Springville and Shinnecock Road.

=== State Bicycle Route 25 ===
New York State Bicycle Route 25
- Location: Smithtown–Orient Point

New York State Bicycle Route 25 runs from Smithtown east to Orient Point, passing through Port Jefferson Station, Shoreham, and Riverhead. The route is actually shared with NY 25A from the Village of the Branch to Calverton, with diversions in St. James along Woodlawn Avenue, then Northern Boulevard to Railroad Avenue toward St. James Railroad Station, and back to NY 25A from Lake Avenue. The route also diverts from Route 25A from Stony Brook to Setauket along Suffolk County Road 68, and from Port Jefferson to Sound Beach along East Broadway, Belle Terre Road and North Country Road. Along NY 25, the route diverges in Riverhead and Aquebogue at Manor Road, Middle Road, Ostrand Avenue, Elton Street, then to Hubbard Avenue and Edgar Avenue. Within Greenport, the bike route diverges along the second New York Truck Route 25 (Moores Lane), onto Suffolk County Road 48 before reuniting with NY 25 again south of Stirling.

=== State Bicycle Route 25A ===
New York State Bicycle Route 25A
- Location: Cold Spring Harbor–Smithtown

New York State Bicycle Route 25A runs from the border of Nassau and Suffolk counties in Cold Spring Harbor east to Smithtown, passing through Huntington. The route doesn't actually share NY 25A until it reaches Kings Park. Bike Route 25A begins on Suffolk County Road 11 (Pulaski Road) at the Cold Spring Harbor Railroad Station, then turns south onto Suffolk County Route 92 (Oakwood Road), only to move east again onto 11th Street, which turns into East Rogues Path. Terminating at Maplewood Road, it turns left there, which itself terminates at Suffolk County Route 35 (Park Avenue). Bike Route 25A turns northwest momentarily and then heads back east onto Little Plains Road, which is completely shared with the route. When Little Plains Road ends, Bike Route 25A shares the last segment of Suffolk County Road 9 (Cuba Hill Road), but continues onto Burr Road beyond County Route 10 (Elwood Road) until it reaches Suffolk County Road 4 (Town Line Road), and turns north. At Scholar Lane, Bike Route 25A heads east again and after crossing over the Sunken Meadow State Parkway turns north again over Old Commack Road, which runs mostly parallel to the parkway. Old Commack Road terminates at CR 11 in Kings Park, and reunites with the County Road again. Whereas CR 11 terminates at NY 25A, Bike Route 25A continues onto Old Dock Road until it reaches Kohr Road, where it turns south and turns onto NY 25A at Suffolk County Road 14. The route finally runs along the state highway it was named after until it reaches the Smithtown Bull.

=== State Bicycle Route 27 ===
New York State Bicycle Route 27
- Location: Southampton Village–Montauk Point State Park

New York State Bicycle Route 27 runs along NY 27 (also known as Montauk Highway) from Suffolk County Road 39A (North Highway) just inside the village of Southampton to the Montauk Point Lighthouse inside Montauk Point State Park (also the terminus of NYS Route 27).

=== State Bicycle Route 28 ===
New York State Bicycle Route 28
- Location: Kingston–Shandaken

New York State Bicycle Route 28 runs from Kingston north to the border of Delaware and Ulster counties in Shandaken, passing through Catskill Park.

=== State Bicycle Route 32 ===
New York State Bicycle Route 32
- Location: New Paltz–Kingston

New York State Bicycle Route 32 runs along a short segment of New York State Route 32 from New Paltz north to Kingston.

=== State Bicycle Route 44 ===
New York State Bicycle Route 44
- Location: Poughkeepsie–Millerton

New York State Bicycle Route 44 runs in close proximity to U.S. Route 44 from Poughkeepsie east and northeast to the Connecticut border in Millerton, passing through Millbrook.

=== State Bicycle Route 114 ===
New York State Bicycle Route 114
- Location: East Hampton–Greenport

New York State Bicycle Route 114 is shared entirely with NY 114, except within Sag Harbor where it diverts onto Hempstead Street, then Bay Street before rejoining NY 114, and in Greenport, where it continues west from NY 114's northern terminus along NY 25 until it reaches the second New York Truck Route 25 (Moore's Lane), and New York State Bicycle Route 25.

=== State Bicycle Route 199 ===
New York State Bicycle Route 199
- Location: Ulster–Milan

New York State Bicycle Route 199 follows Route 199 from Route 32 in Ulster across the Kingston–Rhinecliff Bridge east through Red Hook to Route 308 in Milan.

=== State Bicycle Route 208 ===
New York State Bicycle Route 208
- Location: Washingtonville–New Paltz

New York State Bicycle Route 208 runs along most of New York State Route 208 from Washingtonville north to New Paltz, passing through Montgomery.

=== State Bicycle Route 209 ===
New York State Bicycle Route 209
- Location: Port Jervis

New York State Bicycle Route 209 runs within Port Jervis from the Pennsylvania border, where it connects to BicyclePA Route Y1. The route runs along a long portion of U.S. Route 209 until it reaches Mill Dam Road in Stone Ridge, New York. The route follows Mill Dam Road until it turns north onto Bogart Lane until that road ends and then turns northwest onto Tongore Road until the intersection with Hurley Mountain Road (Ulster CR 5) and remains along this road until it reaches New York State Route 28 and New York State Bicycle Route 28. The route is proposed to continue north to Kingston.

=== State Bicycle Route 308 ===
New York State Bicycle Route 308
- Location: Rhinebeck–Milan

New York State Bicycle Route 308 runs entirely along New York State Route 308 from the Village of Rhinebeck to NY 199 in Milan.

=== State Bicycle Route 517 ===
New York State Bicycle Route 517
- Location: Pennsylvania/New York state line–Lockport

New York State Bicycle Route 517 runs from the Pennsylvania-New York State line at the Eastern Terminus of USBR 30 north through Chautauqua, Erie and Niagara Countries to Lockport. Route 517 passes through the communities of Shore Haven, Westfield, Van Buren Bay, Dunkirk, Silver Creek, Cattaraugus Indian Reservation, Farnham, Evans Center, Mount Vernon, Blasdell, Lackawanna, Buffalo, Getzville, South Lockport before ending in the City of Lockport at New York State Bicycle Route 5.
