= Benjamin Ten Broeck House =

Historic house in New York, United States

- U.S. National Register of Historic Places
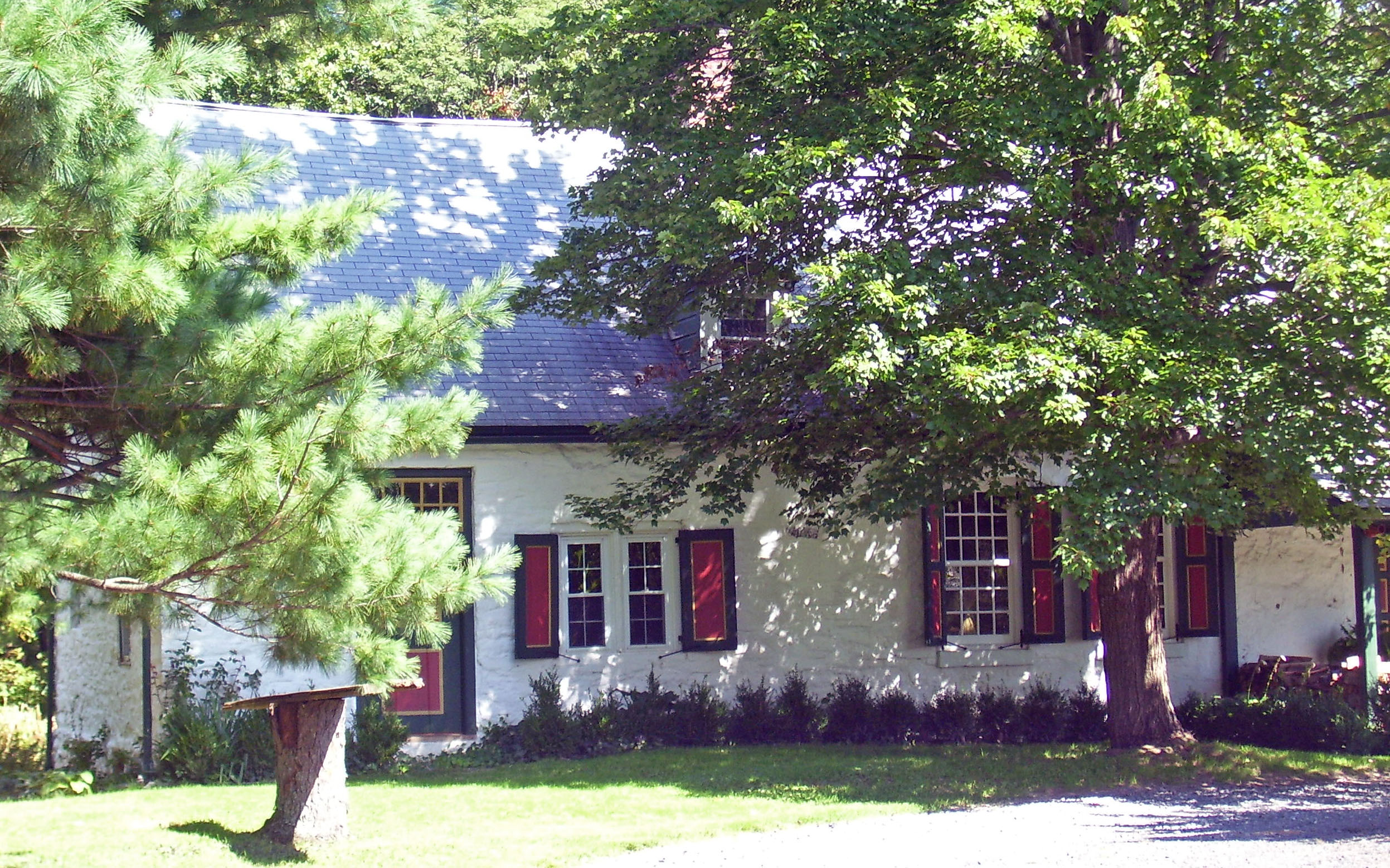
- South elevation, 2008

- Location within New York Location within the United States
- Location: Town of Ulster, NY
- Coordinates: 41°58′33″N 73°58′12″W
- Area: 2.7 acres (1.1 ha)
- Built: 1751–1770
- NRHP reference No.: 05001395
- Added to NRHP: December 7, 2005

The Benjamin Ten Broeck House, also known as the Felten-Ten Broeck-Chmura House, is located on Flatbush Road (NY 32) in the Town of Ulster, north of Kingston, New York, United States. It is a stone house built in three stages in the years before the Revolution.

It was built by Benjamin Ten Broeck, a wealthy landowner whose estate it was on, for his tenants. Since his house was demolished it is the only extant remnant of that estate. Its overall design is of Dutch origin, but the kitchen design indicates that it was used by Palatine German immigrants. Vandalism and theft have cost it some of its original finishings, but it has retained its integrity. In 2005 it was listed on the National Register of Historic Places.

== Building ==
The house is located on a 2.7-acre (1.1 ha) parcel of land on the east side of Flatbush Road just south of the onramps to NY 199 and the western approach to the Kingston-Rhinecliff Bridge. The area is mostly open fields or woodlots, with a few other houses roughly 0.3 mile (500 m) south along the same side of Flatbush. The house is set back about 200 feet (60 m) from the road, with large trees screening it from view. An unpaved driveway leads to it from the road, making a small circle in front of the house.

It is a one-and-a-half-story building of limestone rubble blocks white from lime washing. The gabled roof is shingled in asphalt; clapboard fills the gable fields on the side elevations. Two brick chimneys pierce the roof along with two gabled dormer windows in the center of the south side.

The south (front) elevation reflects the three phases of the house's construction. At the east end is a shed-roofed porch and the main entrance. In the center is a pair of large 12-over-12 sash windows in casements, with a smaller pair of windows followed by a secondary entrance at the north end. All the windows have solid wooden shutters painted red and green. The west profile has two windows, one on each story, with the east having double that. On the north (rear) elevation there are only two windows in the west and center.

Each section of the house is essentially an open room. The center section was partitioned into smaller spaces, and the east section is slightly below the floor level of the other two. The east and center sections have fireplaces, the latter with a wooden Georgian mantel. Exposed ceiling beams support the garrets above. The western and center sections are connected by a battened door with wrought iron strap hinges and pancake nailing plates.

== History ==
=== 1751–1770: Original construction ===
Benjamin Ten Broeck I, who built the house, was the great-grandson of Wessel Ten Broeck, who had come to the New Netherland colony in 1626 with Peter Minuit. In 1748 he built his manor house (since demolished) near the site where three years later he built the first section of present house, intended to house tenant farmers on his land. A family named Felten, probably the descendants of early 18th century refugees from the Palatinate region of Germany, were the first tenants.

Ten Broeck built the house in accordance with Dutch vernacular building traditions as they had been adapted by settlers in the area. Among those was an open jambless hearth in the center of the space for cooking and heating purposes. This section was probably open originally and subdivided later. The second phase, the western section, continued the line of the house in the Dutch fashion when it was built in 1765.

The placement of trimmer beams on the west wall of the 1765 addition suggests that the original plan called for another jambless hearth on that side. But no hearth support exists below, and it is likely instead that the plan was changed during construction to allow for a cast iron stove on a masonry support that could be heated with coals drawn from the fireplace in the center room. This arrangement, called a Stube, is typical of German houses of the time and suggests that the occupants of the house were of that national background.

The last phase, the eastern wing, was probably built around 1770 although the style of the contemporaneous mantel addition in the center suggests it could have been as late as 1790. The change to the center fireplace was probably a result of the new wing being conceived as a kitchen.

=== 1777–present: Changes and preservation ===
In 1777, British ships on the Hudson River fired on the Ten Broeck house during the burning of Kingston. The family took refuge in the farmhouse while the main house was repaired.

After the Revolution, most of the estate remained in Ten Broeck family hands until the early 20th century. Their residency on it is less clear. One account has it that Elizabeth Maraquat, Benjamin Ten Broeck I's granddaughter, remained in the main house until 1820. The earliest recorded deed for the land it sits on, however, is from 1803 and describes it as being sold by a Johannis Snyder of Kingston to William Prince of Fairfield County, Connecticut. Snyder, whom the deed indicates was living on the land at the time, is believed to be the younger brother of Maria Felten. This suggests the former tenants had already taken title to the property by that time.

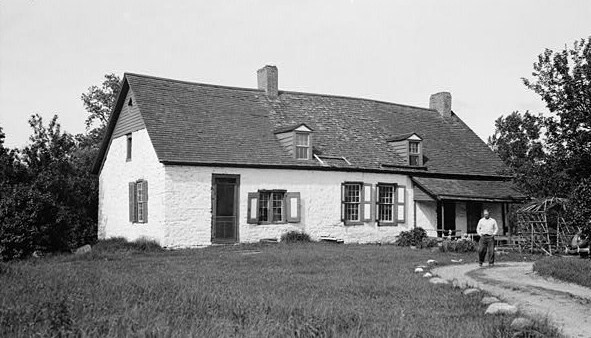
House as photographed for HABS in 1936

In 1904 the main house was demolished, leaving the tenant house the only remnant of what was once a large estate north of Kingston. Three decades later, in 1936, the house was documented for the Historic American Buildings Survey (HABS). Photographs taken of it at that time show that there were no trees around it.

Shortly afterwards, in 1939, a Kingston antique dealer visited the house. He was gathering artifacts for the Winterthur Museum in Delaware, and succeeded in exchanging a historically accurate window casement for one of the originals. He also offered to buy the interior door but the owner at that time, a farmer named Steven Chmura, declined.

Since then, in periods of vacancy between ownership, the house has been subject to theft and vandalism. This cost it the original shutters and the door between the central and western sections. Around 1990 the western door was closed off and all the floorboards replaced with similarly designed modern wood. The current owner has also had to replace the window casements.

== See also ==
- National Register of Historic Places listings in Ulster County, New York
