= New York State Route 308 =

State highway in Dutchess County, New York, US

New York State Route 308
- Map of the Rhinebeck area with NY 308 highlighted in red and NY 982M in blue

Route information
- Maintained by NYSDOT
- Length: 6.19 mi (9.96 km)
- Existed: 1930–present

Major junctions
- West end: US 9 in Rhinebeck
- NY 9G in Rhinebeck
- East end: NY 199 in Red Hook

Location
- Country: United States
- State: New York
- Counties: Dutchess

Highway system
- New York Highways; Interstate; US; State; Reference; Parkways
← NY 307	→ NY 309

New York State Route 308 (NY 308) is a short state highway, 6.19 miles (9.96 km) in length, located entirely in northern Dutchess County, in the U.S. state of New York. It is a major collector road through a mostly rural area, serving primarily as a shortcut for traffic from the two main north–south routes in the area, U.S. Route 9 (US 9) and NY 9G, to get to NY 199 and the Taconic State Parkway. The western end of NY 308 is located within Rhinebeck's historic district, a 2.6-square-mile (6.7 km^{2}) historic district comprising 272 historical structures. The highway passes near the Dutchess County Fairgrounds, several historical landmarks, and briefly parallels the Landsman Kill.

Artifacts found near Lake Sepasco, near NY 308's eastern terminus at Rock City, date to about 1685, when the Sepasco Native Americans built the Sepasco Trail from the Hudson River, eastward through modern-day Rhinebeck (then Sepasco or Sepascoot) to the lake, following roughly NY 308 and its side roads. The trail remained until 1802, when part of the Ulster and Delaware Turnpike—also known as the Salisbury Turnpike—was chartered over the trail and extended from Salisbury, Connecticut, to the Susquehanna River at or near the Town of Jericho (now Bainbridge).

NY 308 was designated as part of the 1930 renumbering of New York state highways, incorporating a portion of the former Ulster and Delaware Turnpike. The route originally extended from Milan westward to Rhinecliff to serve a ferry landing on the Hudson River. It was truncated to US 9 in the 1960s, but its former routing to Rhinecliff is still state-maintained as an unsigned reference route. The highway was also intended to cross the Hudson via the Kingston–Rhinecliff Bridge until plans were changed to involve other routes and the site for the bridge was moved about 3 miles (5 km) upriver.

== Route description ==
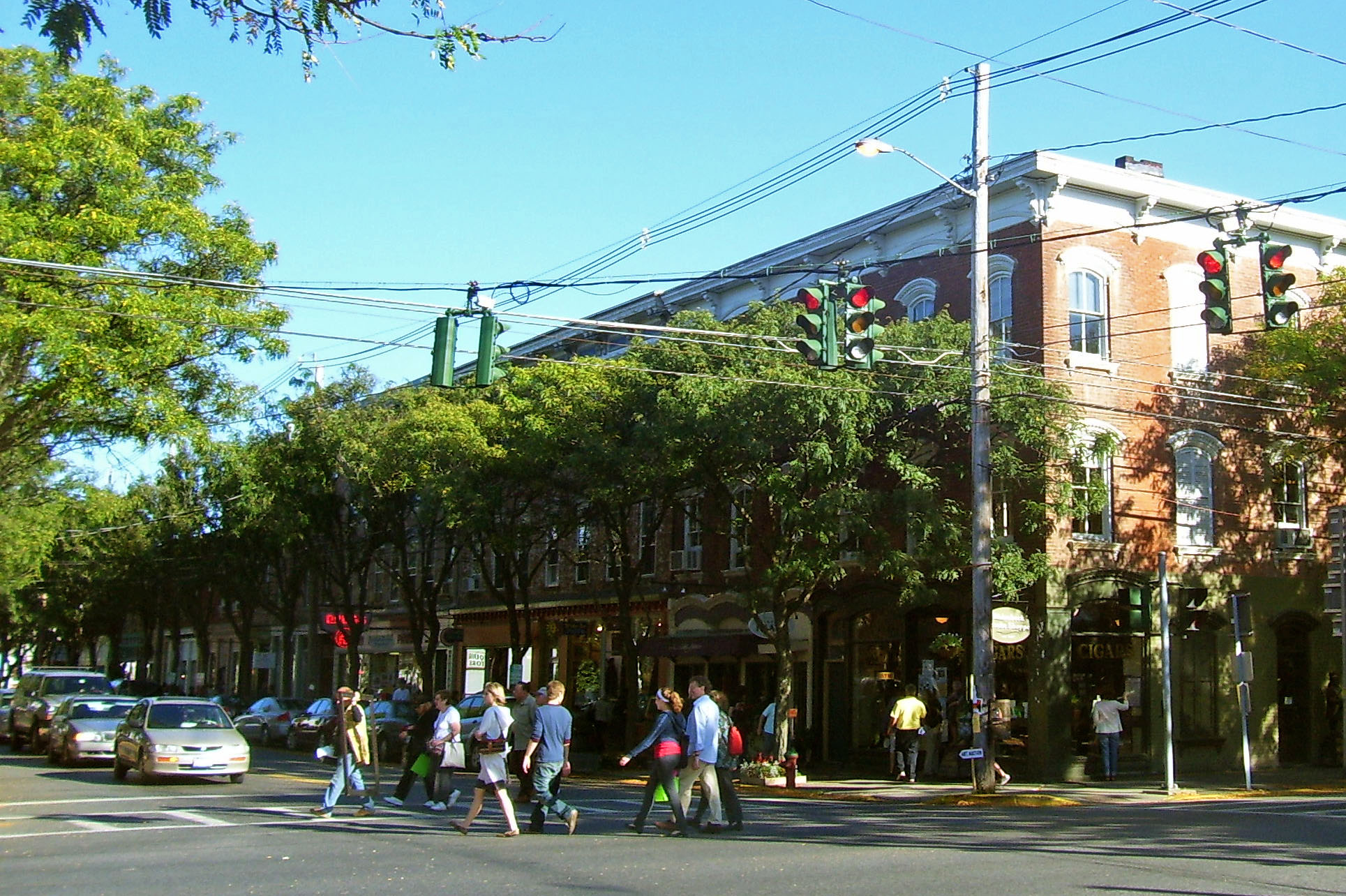
NY 308's western terminus at US 9 in downtown Rhinebeck

NY 308 begins from its western terminus at an intersection with US 9 in the Dutchess County village of Rhinebeck, at about 200 feet (61 m) in elevation. It is within the Rhinebeck Village Historic District, a 1,670-acre (6.8 km^{2}) historic district that contains 272 buildings in a variety of architectural styles dating from over 200 years of the settlement's history. One of those buildings, the Beekman Arms Inn, at the corner of routes 9 and 308, claims to be the oldest continuously-operated inn in the United States. founded in 1766.

The highway proceeds eastward on East Market Street for its first half-mile (800 m), passing at first two blocks of stores, then Rhinebeck's village and town halls, followed by residences. It merges with South Street where the Landsman Kill begins to parallel it closely on the south side. Between the stream and NY 308, just past this junction, is the Jan Pier House, another of Rhinebeck's National Register-listed properties.

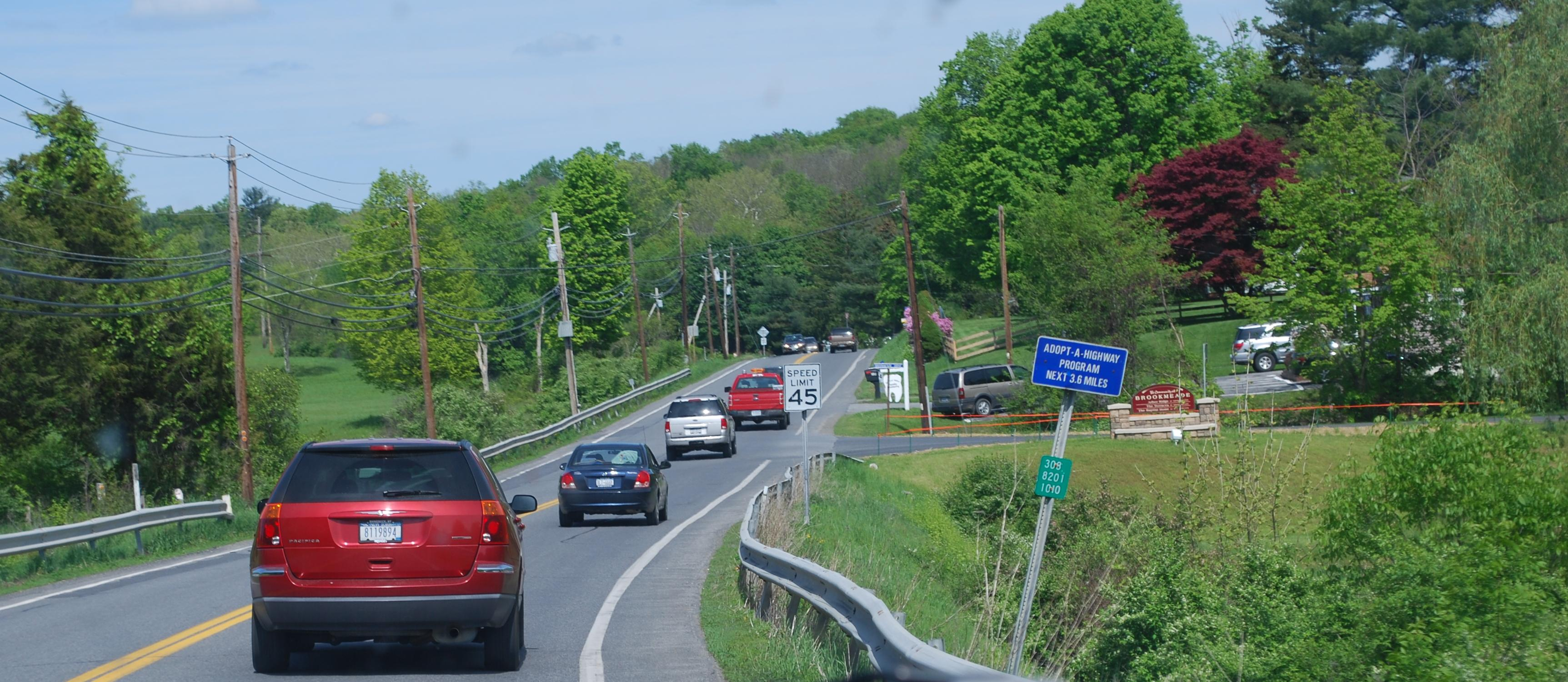
View east along NY 308 east of Rhinebeck

After passing Wynkoop Lane on the north NY 308 leaves the village and enters the Town of Rhinebeck; the surrounding area becomes more rural, with more woodlots and fields. Following the intersection with County Route 101 (CR 101, known as Violet Hill Road) NY 308 turns northeast. Another half-mile takes it to its grade-separated intersection with NY 9G, the only state highway NY 308 crosses. After the interchange, it crosses Landsman Kill for the last time, then gradually turns east into a rural area. Between US 9 and NY 9G, NY 308 carries an average of about 6,000 vehicles per day. East of NY 9G, the traffic volume drops to about 3,500 vehicles per day.

Several small lakes surround NY 308 as it intersects CR 52, Salisbury Turnpike, in the hamlet of Eighmyville, 1.1 miles (1.8 km) east of Route 9G, and subsequently turns northeast again for the next two miles (3.2 km), crossing a large area of open fields in a level area, passing between two large hills of at least 400 feet (120 m). After passing Sepasco Lake on the east, NY 308 turns east once again at Old Rock City Road. It passes just to the south of the Red Hook Golf Club before coming to an end at NY 199 in Rock City, a hamlet within the town of Milan that is situated just east of where the Milan, Red Hook, and Rhinebeck town lines converge. The elevation at the east terminus is 330 feet (100 m)

== History ==
=== Native Americans and old roads ===
As indicated by artifacts recovered close to the road in Milan and in other areas along the Hudson River, the earliest inhabitants of the northern Dutchess County region were the Mohicans, a Native American nation, about 3,000 years ago. The range of the Mohicans extended from northern Dutchess County to the southern tip of Lake Champlain, and from the Catskill Mountains to the Berkshires in Massachusetts. The total population of the Mohicans was estimated at 8,000 during the time of first contact with the Europeans, although only 800 remained after the American Revolution. Artifacts were also recovered along the shore of Lake Sepasco – a small lake NY 308 passes near its eastern terminus, including ancient arrowheads displayed at the Museum of Rhinebeck History in October 2000.

A group of these Native Americans were, in deeds and correspondence, known as the Sepasco Indians, a name specific to Native Americans in the Sepasco area (modern-day Rhinebeck). The word Sepasco probably originated from the tribe's word for little river or stream, sepuus, which is believed to have referred to the Landsman Kill. By 1685, a trail known as the Sepasco Trail was formed by them and was routed from the Hudson River, eastward through the present-day Village of Rhinebeck, ending at Lake Sepasco. The trail from the Village of Rhinebeck to Lake Sepasco follows roughly modern-day NY 308, in some areas slightly to the south, where the highway's side roads are curved in a pattern similar to that of the Sepasco Trail. It is possible that the trail as a whole existed as a spur of an ancient path that stretched from Rhinebeck to today's Cornwall, Connecticut.

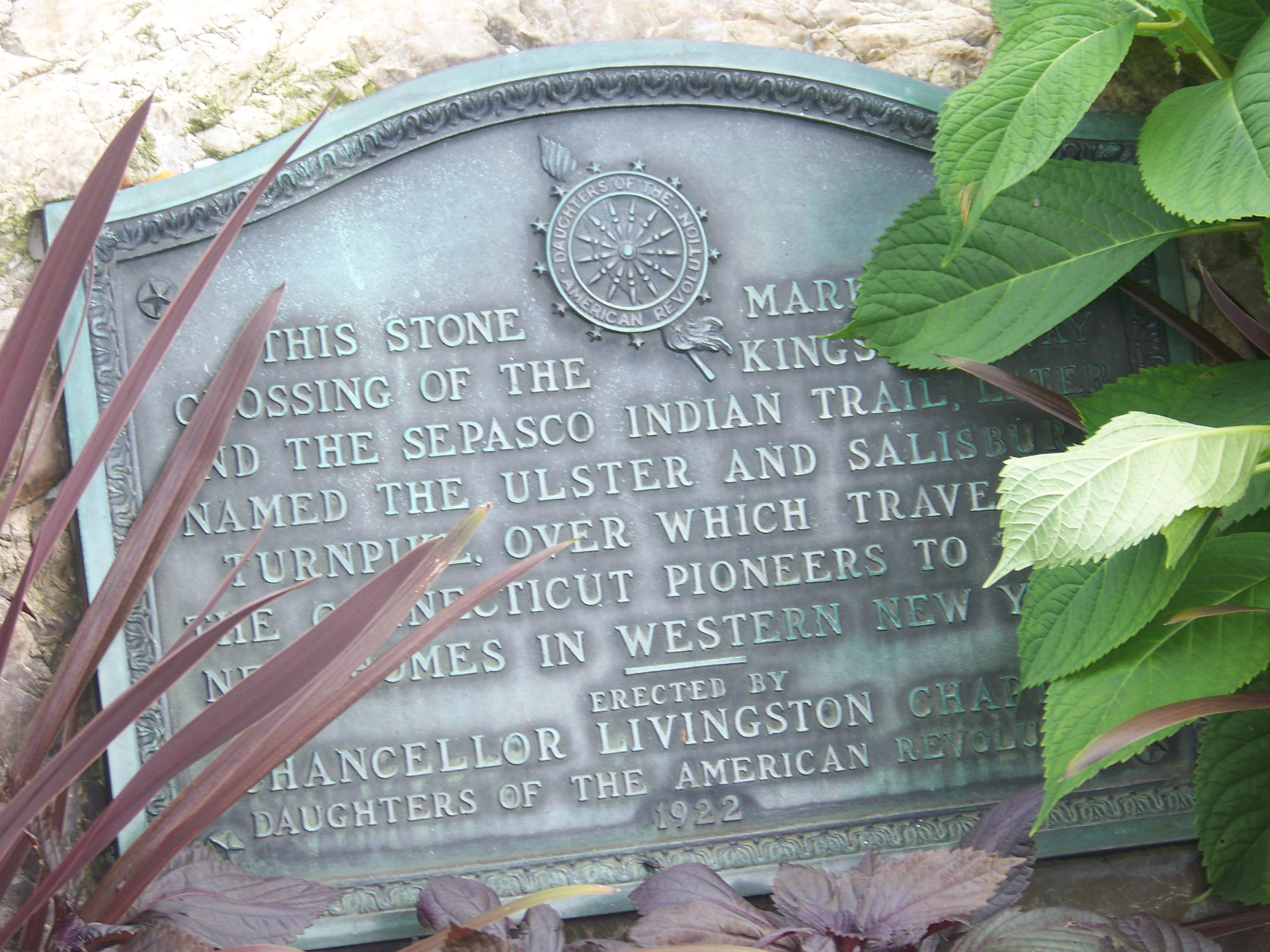
A plaque at the intersection of NY 308 and US 9, placed in 1922, marks the crossing of the Kings Highway and the former Sepasco Trail.

The trail remained intact until 1802, when part of the Ulster and Delaware Turnpike was chartered over it "for improving and making a road from the west line of the Town of Salisbury in the State of Connecticut to the Susquehannah [sic] River at or near the Town of Jericho [present-day Bainbridge]". The portion of the Ulster and Delaware Turnpike east of the Hudson River was also commonly known as the Ulster and Salisbury Turnpike. The turnpike crossed the river by way of the Kingston–Rhinecliff Ferry and used modern Rhinecliff Road and West Market Street to the village center of Rhinecliff, then followed roughly modern NY 308 to the hamlet of Eighmyville. It continued east from there using part of CR 52 to eventually connect with NY 199.

A bronze plaque attached to a large boulder was erected in November 1922 by Chancellor Livingston Chapter of the Daughters of the American Revolution on the property of the Beekman Arms, that marked the crossing of the Kings Highway (present-day US 9) and the Ulster and Salisbury Turnpike. Still existent, it reads "This stone marks the crossing of the Kings Highway and the Sepasco Indian Trail, later named the Ulster and Salisbury Turnpike, over which traveled the Connecticut Pioneers to their new homes in western New York."

=== Designation ===
The NY 308 designation was assigned as part of the 1930 renumbering of New York state highways. At the time, it extended from the Rhinecliff ferry landing to Rock City in the town of Milan. West of US 9, NY 308 continued to follow the old turnpike alignment to Hutton Street, where it connected to the Kingston–Rhinecliff Ferry. In 1947, the ferry was the only crossing of the Hudson River between Catskill (the Rip Van Winkle Bridge) and Poughkeepsie (the Mid-Hudson Bridge)—a distance of 36 miles (58 km)—and the only one serving the Kingston area.

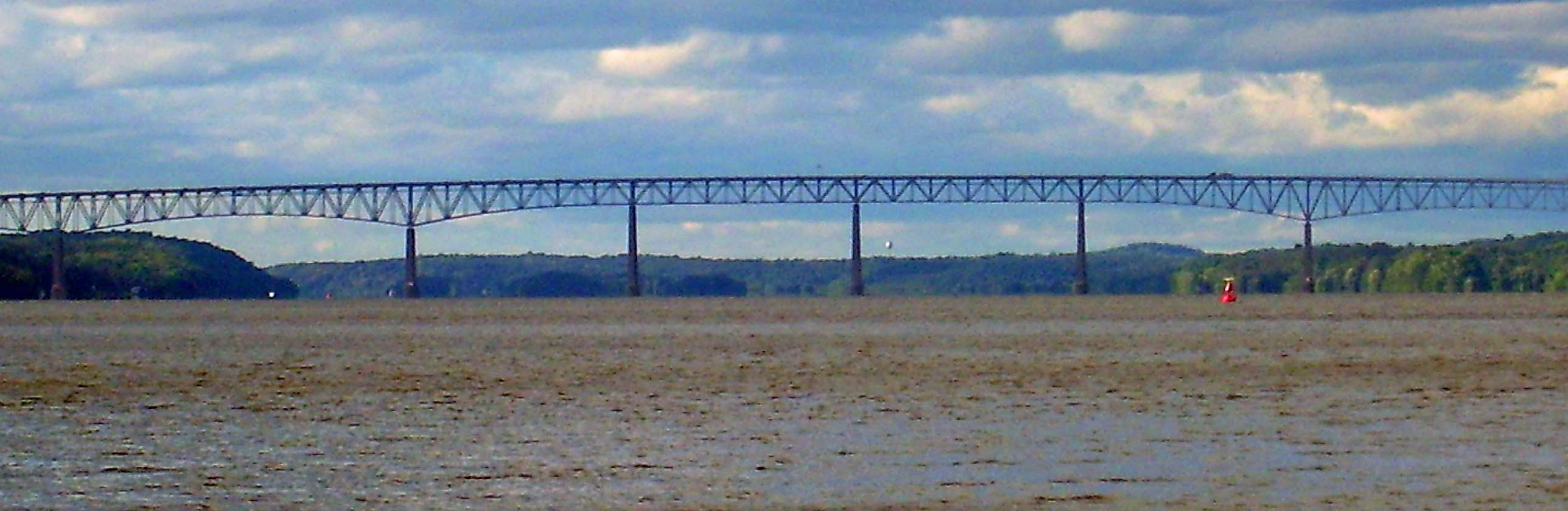
The Kingston–Rhinecliff Bridge

Initial plans for the Kingston–Rhinecliff Bridge, a structure that replaced the ferry between the two locations, called for the bridge to span the Hudson River between downtown Kingston (at Kingston Point) and the village of Rhinebeck along a corridor similar to that of NY 308. Due to political and economic factors, the bridge site was moved 3 miles (5 km) upstream (northward). The bridge, then partially complete, opened to traffic on February 2, 1957, at which time the ferry service between Kingston and Rhinecliff was terminated. However, NY 308 continued to extend west to Rhinecliff up to the 1960s, when it was truncated to US 9 in the village of Rhinebeck. The section of former NY 308 west of US 9 is now designated as NY 982M, an unsigned reference route.

== Major intersections ==
The entire route is in Dutchess County.

Location	mi	km	Destinations	Notes
Village of Rhinebeck	0.00	0.00	West Market Street (NY 982M)	Continuation past US 9
Village of Rhinebeck	0.00	0.00	US 9 (Mill Street / Montgomery Street)	Western terminus
Town of Rhinebeck	1.82	2.93	NY 9G to New York Thruway / Kingston Bridge – Poughkeepsie, Germantown	
Town of Milan	6.19	9.96	NY 199 to Taconic State Parkway	Eastern terminus; hamlet of Rock City, New York
1.000 mi = 1.609 km; 1.000 km = 0.621 mi
