= Maizefield =

Historic house in Red Hook, NY, USA

- U.S. National Register of Historic Places
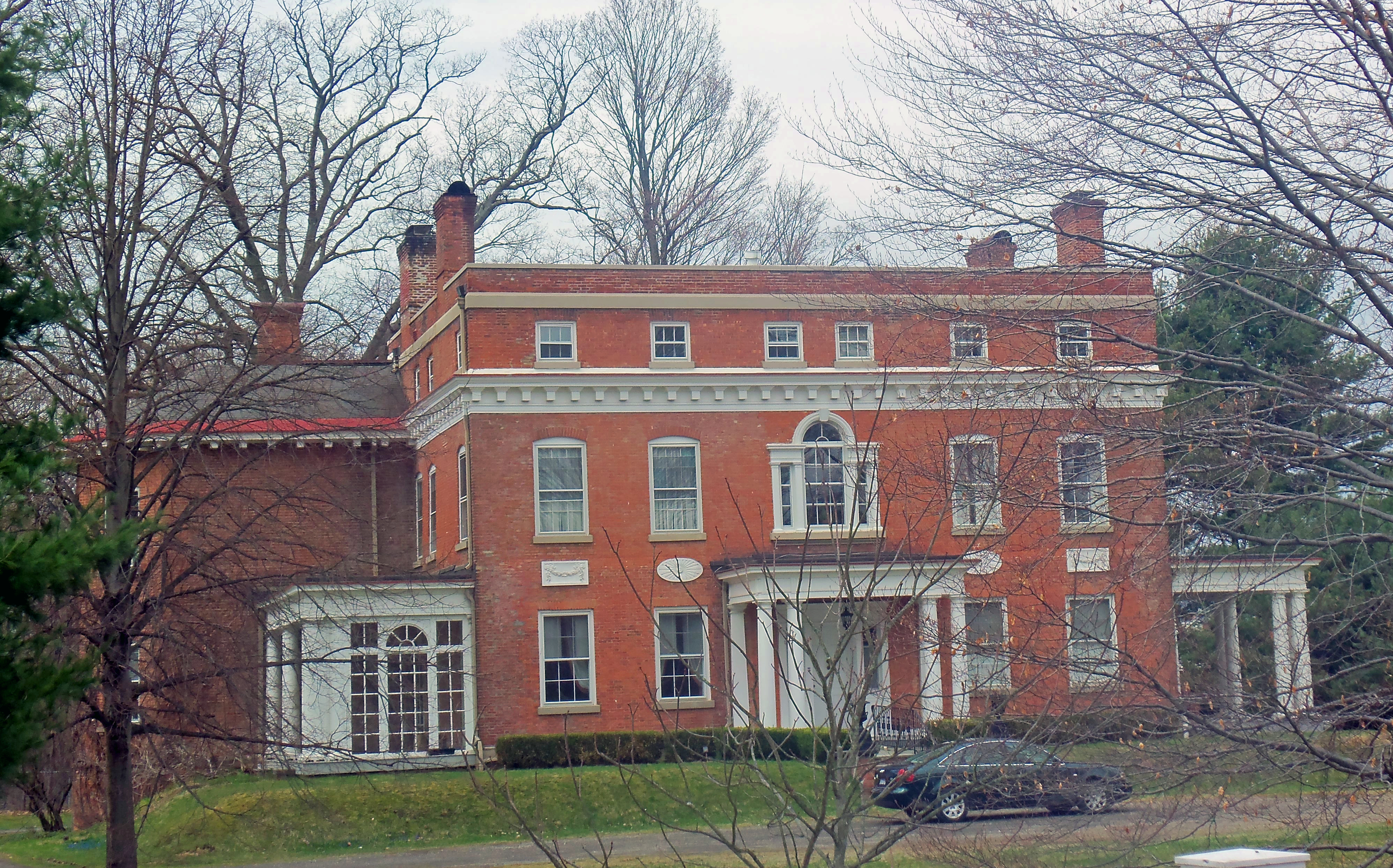
- East (front) elevation, 2013

- Location within New York Location within the United States
- Location: Red Hook, NY
- Nearest city: Kingston, NY
- Coordinates: 41°59′53″N 73°52′54″W
- Area: 5 acres (2.0 ha)
- Built: c. 1795, 1849
- Architect: Alexander Jackson Davis
- Architectural style: Federal
- NRHP reference No.: 73001184
- Added to NRHP: November 26, 1973

Maizefield, often locally called Maizeland, is a historic house on West Market Street (New York State Route 199) in the village of Red Hook, New York, United States. It is a large plain brick building, in the Federal style, with clear English Georgian influences, built around the end of the 18th century. In 1973 it was listed on the National Register of Historic Places.

The house was occupied by General David Van Ness, a Continental Army officer during the Revolutionary War and later Brigadier General of the Dutchess County Militia, state assemblyman and senator who was the first supervisor of the Town of Red Hook. It is not known if the house was built prior to his ownership; he sold the property shortly before his death in the 1810s. Aaron Burr hid there for a while shortly after killing Alexander Hamilton in a duel.

The house has been altered several times since then, including the addition of large wing on the south side. In the middle of the century, a timber-frame Victorian cottage was built on the southwest corner of the property. Later research found that it was designed by Alexander Jackson Davis. A number of prominent local families have lived in both houses since, and they remain private residences.

== Buildings and grounds ==
The house is on a 5-acre (2.0 ha) lot on the north side of West Market, on the eastern outskirts of the village, roughly 1,300 feet (400 m) west of the junction with Broadway (U.S. Route 9) at the center of town. Surrounding terrain is generally level. Red Hook Middle School, a similarly large building on a slightly larger parcel, is to the east along with some other residences on larger lots.

To the south, across West Market, are residential neighborhoods with smaller houses on smaller lots. North of the property is the track and football field associated with Red Hook High School to the northwest. Further west, at the western boundary of the village, is the school's driveway, some of its parking lots and its soccer field.

A high brick wall, with two openings near the west corner, runs along the south boundary of the property. Two wooden paneled fences, almost the same height, delineate the eastern and western bounds. Entry to the lot is via a driveway on the east that connects to the middle school's entrance road, opposite another entry road on the south side of the school building. The driveway goes south of the house, leading to carports on its east and west. Tall, mature shade trees and a chain-link fence screen the house on the south and west, with other trees lining the north and east bounds.

=== Main house ===
On the east and south elevations the main house stands on a slight, landscaped rise. Maintained shrubbery is in front of the first story windows. The main block of the house is faced in brick laid in English bond on all sides but the west, which is done in stone. It is three stories high, five bays wide by four deep, roughly 55 by 40 feet (17 by 12 m), and topped by a flat roof pierced by four brick chimneys at the corners. Extending from the west side of the south face is a two-story, semi-octagonal wing with a hipped roof pierced by one brick chimney; to its east is a small, partially enclosed, flat-roofed one-story porch. Verandas are affixed to the north and west sides; the former also has a flat roof but is unenclosed.

On the east (front) facade's first story, two double-hung six-over-six sash windows are on either side of the centrally located main entrance. They have plain surrounds, with plain stone sills and splayed brick lintels. Between them and their second-story counterparts are wooden panels, rectangular with a festoon motif on the outer bays and elliptical with a sunburst pattern on those closer to the center.

Above the entrance, in the center of the second story, is a Palladian window that has a plain stone sill and six-over-six double-hung sash, the only feature it shares with the other windows. This window has a wooden surround with molded lintel. Its transom is set with a window with two muntins, one paralleling the semicircular arch near the center and the other radiating upward towards the molded wooden keystone at the center of the arch. The two flanking windows have three vertical lights flanked by engaged smooth square pilasters topped by a wide plain frieze. On the sides, the other windows are similar to those below except for being topped by a gentle splayed brick arch.

A frieze above gives way to a modillioned cornice with large blocks. Above it are the windows of the third story, all square set with three-over-three double-hung sash with stone sills, plain wooden surrounds and splayed brick lintels. In the middle there are two, set slightly closer together. A plain stone belt course above them sets off the roof parapet, itself capped with stone.

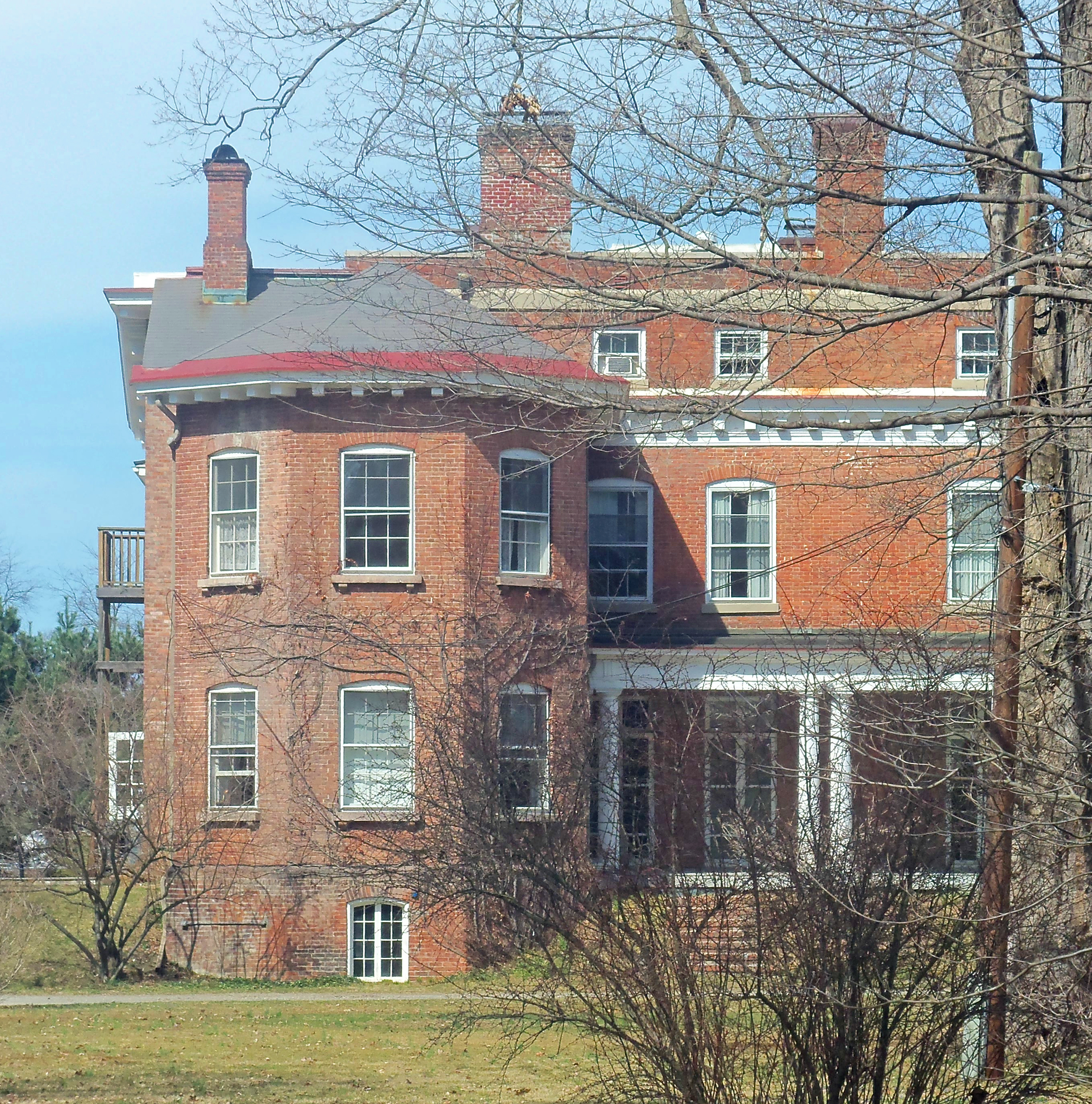
South elevation, 2013

The downslope in the ground exposes the basement of the wing. Brick steps lead up to the porch on the eastern side. Its gently pitched hipped roof is supported on the front by two smooth round columns in the center with a similar column on either side, topped by a wide plain frieze and molded cornice.

The east wall has a full-height window partly echoing the Palladian window in the center of the east facade. A 15-pane central window topped by a semicircular transom with three radiating muntins is flanked by two 10-pane windows topped with two-pane transoms. These are also echoes of the French doors they shelter, which serve as a secondary entrance. Above them on the second story are three windows with the same treatment as those on the east facade, with two in the center bays and one at the corner, leaving the bay in between them blank. That placement is also followed by the six-over-six double-hung sash above the cornice on the third story.

On the wing, all windows have the same treatment as those on the second story, except for one on the south facet of the exposed basement. It is set with a gently arched casement window of two panels with eight panes each. It, too, is topped by a splayed brick arch. The modillioned cornice on the main block continues on the roof's overhanging eave; the shingled roof has a red section near its base. A cross-gabled section near the main block's southwest corner supports the wing's chimney. On the west side of the wing, a wooden staircase descends from the second floor; a one-story modern addition is on the west elevation just to its north.

A deck projects from the north side of the western addition. Just to its east, on the north side of the main block, is a full-width veranda. Like its counterpart on the south, its gently hipped roof is supported by paired smooth circular wooden columns topped by a plain wide frieze. Unlike the southern veranda, it is completely unenclosed.

The main entrance is sheltered by a portico similar to the north and south verandas. It has coupled smooth round columns topped by a full entablature and gently pitched hipped roof. An iron lantern on a chain hangs from the underside. It illuminates a six-paneled double wooden door with flanking sidelights. It is framed by pilasters, with a frieze of triglyphs and metopes above topped by a dentilled cornice.

It opens on a central hall that ends slightly before it reaches the western wall. Much of the finishing on the first floor, such as doors, frames, cornices, and plaster decoration in ceilings is from the house's mid-19th century renovations. The largest original piece remaining is a mantelpiece in the northeast parlor, decorated with garlands and fruit baskets. Folding interior shutters still exist on all the windows. Upstairs, the doors, frames and fireplace trim is also original.

=== Outbuildings ===
An unpainted wooden picket fence separates the southwest corner of the property. One of the two lots within it is the primary outbuilding of the historic Maizefield property. Two cuts in the brick wall provide access to it, the eastern to the front walk and the western to the driveway.

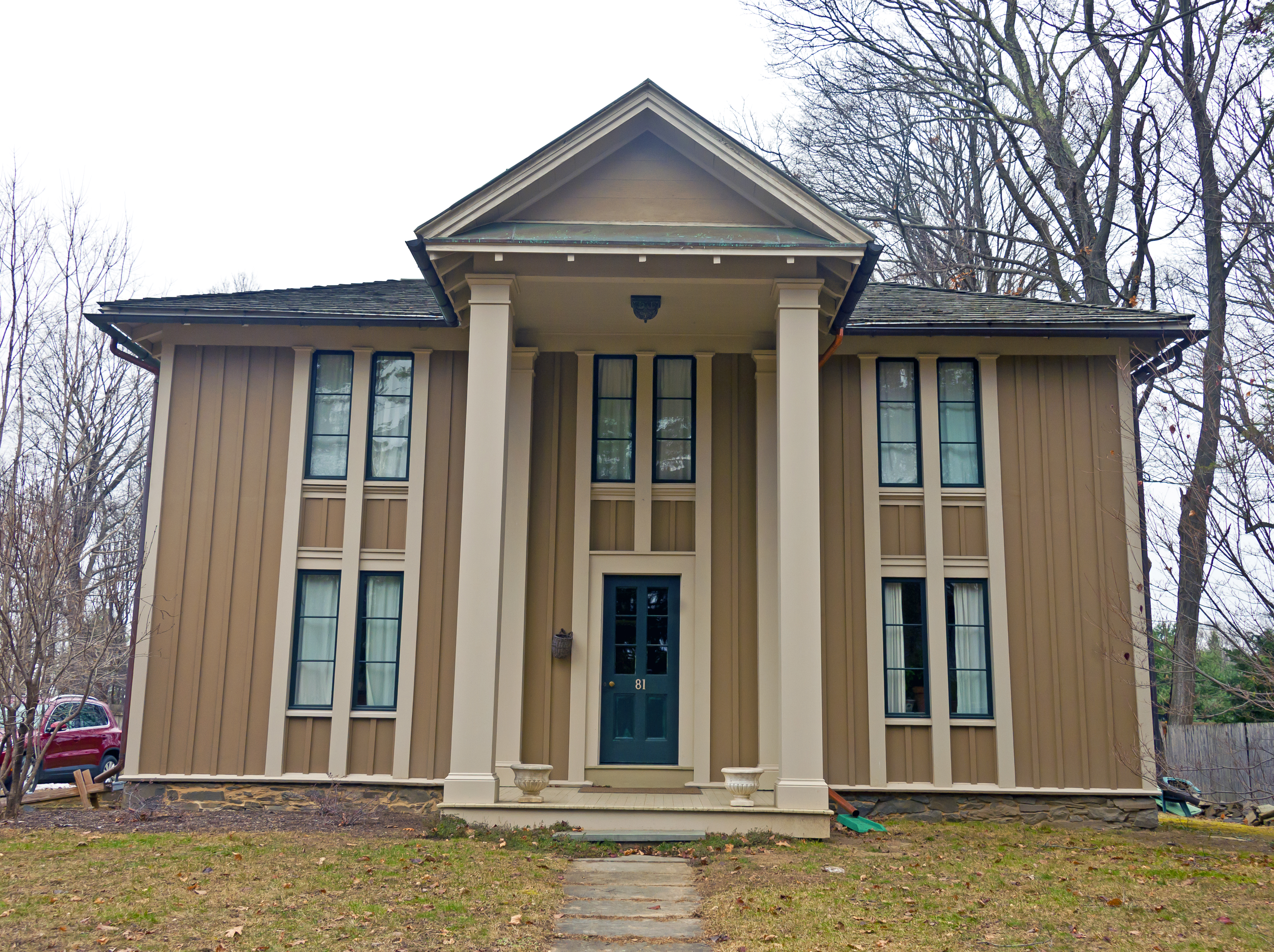
South (front) elevation of cottage, 2014

The outbuilding is a two-story, three-by-one-bay timber frame cottage on an exposed stone foundation. It is sided in vertical board and batten and topped with a hipped roof covered in shingles, pierced by two centrally located brick chimneys. On the south (front) elevation is a full-height portico topped by a cross-gable.

All windows are identical, consisting of large, paired, three-pane single casement windows with molded wooden sills and lintels, divided and flanked by small plain square wooden pilasters. The pilasters rise from a wooden water table at the foundation to a narrow plain frieze below the roofline. Regularly placed brackets support the overhanging eaves, which are emphasized by gutters running their full length.

The portico covers only the single center bay. Its roof is supported by four smooth square wooden columns, two freestanding in front and two engaged with the main block at the rear. All have molded capitals and plinths. A single electric light is affixed to the center of the ceiling. The overhanging eave and brackets of the main block's roof line continue around the portico. A slightly sloping section of roof above it on the front forms the bottom of a recessed pediment with plain entablature in the gable.

Both sides feature one window with the same treatment as those in the front in the center of each story. On the north end is an architecturally sympathetic one-story wing. Beyond it, at the rear of the lot, is a timber-frame garage, also sympathetic.

== History ==
David Van Ness came to what later became Red Hook from Columbia County to the north, where his brother Peter built Lindenwald, later the home of President Martin Van Buren and today a National Historic Landmark, outside Kinderhook. He eventually moved south to what is today the hamlet of Upper Red Hook in the northern part of town, married a daughter of prominent local farmer Jacob Heermance, and settled down there, eventually becoming the local postmaster. During the Revolutionary War, he served as an officer in the Continental Army, attaining the rank of captain. In 1778 he was promoted to major in the Dutchess County Militia

After the Revolution, with the coming of American independence, Van Ness went into public service. He was elected to the State Assembly in 1790, and served as an elector in the 1792 presidential election. The following year he was promoted to brigadier general, second in command of the militia. He continued to serve as postmaster, and since he had brought the title with him, the small settlement at the crossroads, previously referred to as Hardscrabble, became known from then on as Red Hook.

Starting in 1789 he had begun acquiring property in the lower village of Red Hook, then part of the Town of Rhinebeck, at the crossroads of what is today Routes 9 and 199. His purchases totaled 364 acres (147 ha) by 1797, including the land on which Maizefield now stands. It is unclear whether the house was there prior to his purchases or he built it; either way, it is believed to have been built at a later point in that period, around 1795 at the earliest.

At the time of its construction, Maizefield had some differences from the current house. An undated watercolor painting shows its original appearance. A side-gabled roof tops the house, and there are no extensions on the north or south. There was, however, a west wing. The painting also shows several outbuildings, including a Dutch barn, but not the cottage currently on the southwest corner.

The house's interior plan represents a break with previous styles. Houses built by pioneering European settlers in the region had kept their ceilings low to conserve heat during the long, cold winters. But that era had ended by the late 18th century, and the descendants of those settlers, more prosperous in their lives and sophisticated in their tastes, wanted to live in less cramped, more elegant homes, and so built higher ceilings such as those in Maizefield. This change occurred without any corresponding improvement in home heating; the four hearths were thus necessary to keep the house sufficiently heated during the winter.

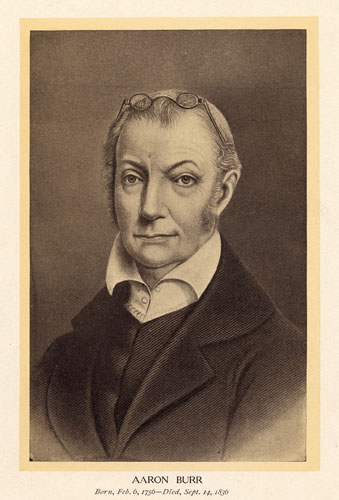
A portrait of Aaron Burr around the time of the duel

With the house complete, in 1800 Van Ness returned to elective office. This time he served a term in the State Senate; the following year he retired from his position in the militia. After he returned to private life, Maizefield played a bit part in the aftermath of one America's early 19th-century political scandals. In 1804, Van Ness's nephew William, an associate and political ally of Vice President Aaron Burr, carried personal letters between Burr and Alexander Hamilton, a fierce opponent of Burr's possible bid for the presidency. In the letters, Burr demanded an apology and explanation from Hamilton for remarks about Burr attributed to him at a Claverack dinner the previous year. When Hamilton's answers proved insufficient to Burr, he instead demanded satisfaction. Van Ness was Burr's second in the ensuing duel, which took place on a midsummer morning on the banks of the Hudson River in what is now Weehawken, New Jersey, near their homes in Manhattan. Burr's shot killed Hamilton, and Van Ness hid Burr for a time afterward at Maizefield.

The construction of Maizefield and Van Ness's subsequent redesignation of the small settlement nearby as Red Hook had helped promote the development of the future village, and in 1812 the state legislature created the Town of Red Hook by dividing what was then Rhinebeck relatively evenly, using an old land-grant boundary to create the line between the two towns today. Van Ness, one of the citizens who had likely petitioned the legislature for the separation, had served as Rhinebeck's town supervisor on occasion. He was thus chosen as the first supervisor of the new town, and also repeated his earlier service as an elector in that year's presidential election.

He did not hold the office long, and in 1815 sold Maizefield, retiring to New York City where he died three years later. Subsequent owners, many of whom, like Van Ness, were members of prominent local families, began altering the property. The south wing and verandas likewise were added later in the century when they became popular. At some other point, the gabled roof was replaced with the current third story and flat-roof combination. Much of the original interior trim was replaced with newer styles in the 1830s.

The later owners began subdividing the property as well, further fueling the growth of the village. In 1849, one owner built on the property the small cottage at the southwest. A century later, research in a pattern book revealed that the architect commissioned was Alexander Jackson Davis.

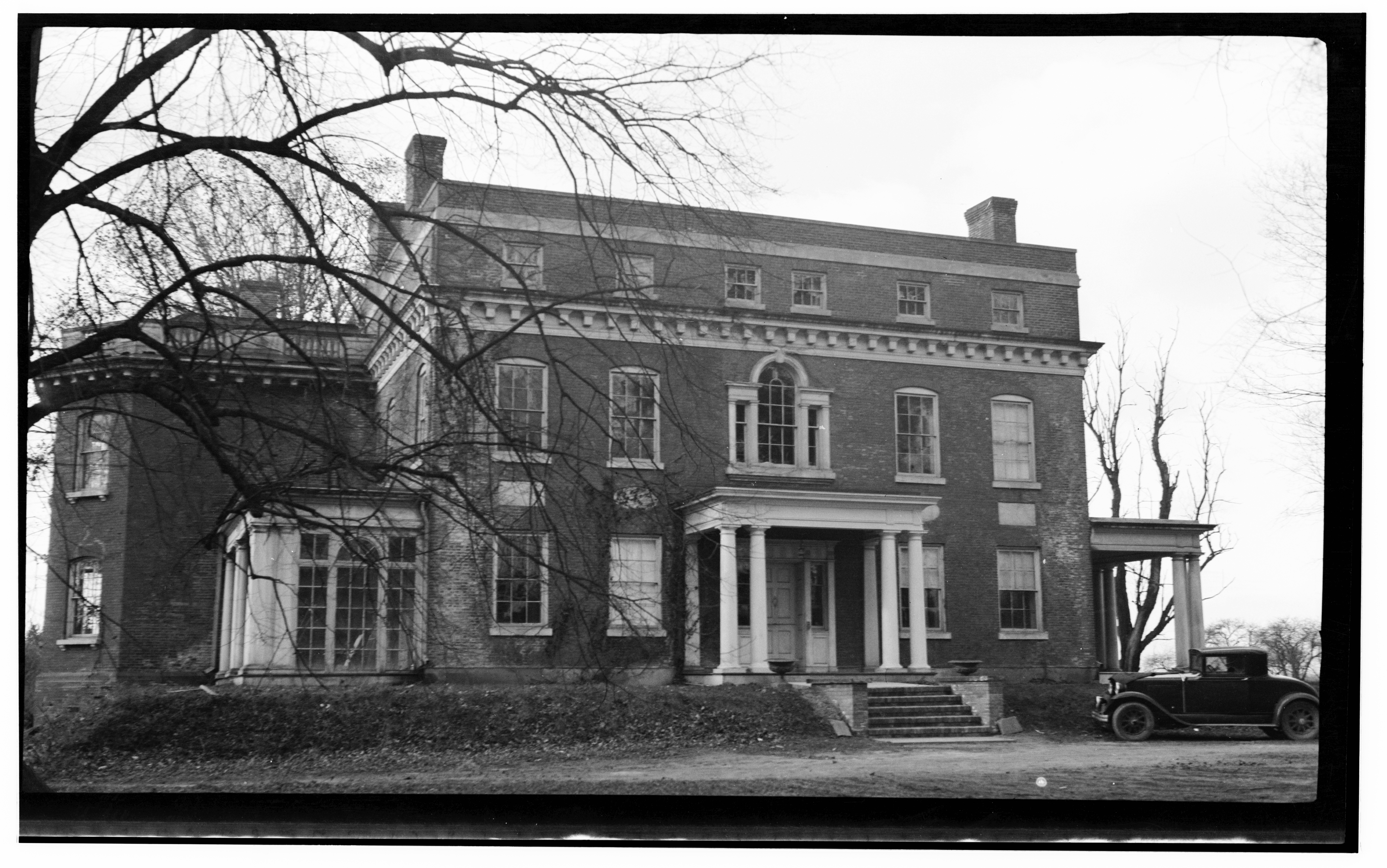
Maizefield in the 1930s

In the 1880s an advertisement for the sale of the house called it "Maizeland". That name is still the predominant in local usage, although the name Maizefield is still used as well. Maizefield was the name used by the 1960s owner of the house, who got it listed on the National Register under that name.

The last major change to the house came in the 1930s, when the west wing was removed. During the 1960s, the owner renovated it in preparation for its nomination to the Register. There have been no significant changes since, and it remains a private residence.

== See also ==
- National Register of Historic Places listings in Dutchess County, New York
