= Rock City, New York =

Hamlet in New York, USA

Coordinates: 41.97051°N 73.82094°W

Rock City is a hamlet and populated place in Dutchess County, New York, United States. It is located at the intersection of New York State Route 199 and Route 308, where the towns of Milan, Red Hook, and Rhinebeck meet.
