= New York State Route 199 =

New York state highway in Ulster and Dutchess counties

New York State Route 199
- Map of the Mid-Hudson Valley with NY 199 highlighted in red

Route information
- Maintained by NYSDOT and NYSBA
- Length: 30.91 mi (49.74 km)
- Existed: 1930–present

Major junctions
- West end: US 9W / US 209 in Ulster
- NY 32 in Ulster; NY 9G from Rhinebeck to Red Hook town; US 9 in Red Hook village; NY 308 in Milan; Taconic State Parkway in Milan; NY 82 in Pine Plains
- East end: US 44 / NY 22 in North East

Location
- Country: United States
- State: New York
- Counties: Ulster, Dutchess

Highway system
- New York Highways; Interstate; US; State; Reference; Parkways
← NY 198	→ NY 200

New York State Route 199 (NY 199) is a 30.91-mile-long (49.74 km) state highway located in the Hudson Valley of the U.S. state of New York. Its western end is in Ulster County, where it begins as the continuation of the short U.S. Route 209 freeway east of its interchange with U.S. Route 9W; after crossing the Kingston–Rhinecliff Bridge over the Hudson River the rest of the highway crosses northern Dutchess County. As it does it passes through downtown Red Hook and Pine Plains, reaching its eastern end at U.S. Route 44 and State Route 22 southwest of Millerton in the upper Harlem Valley.

The portion of Route 199 east of its junction with the Taconic State Parkway was originally part of the Ulster and Delaware Turnpike, a toll road linking Bainbridge to Salisbury, Connecticut. This segment of the turnpike was incorporated into New York State Route 41, a new route connecting Barrytown to Millerton, in the mid-1920s. NY 41 was renumbered to 199 as part of the 1930 renumbering of state highways in New York.

When the Kingston–Rhinecliff Bridge opened in 1957, NY 199 was realigned to continue across the bridge to the town of Ulster. The former routing of the highway between Barrytown and NY 9G along Barrytown Road remained state maintained until 1980, when ownership and maintenance of the highway was transferred to Dutchess County. It is now designated as County Route 82 (CR 82).

== Route description ==
=== Route 9W to Red Hook ===
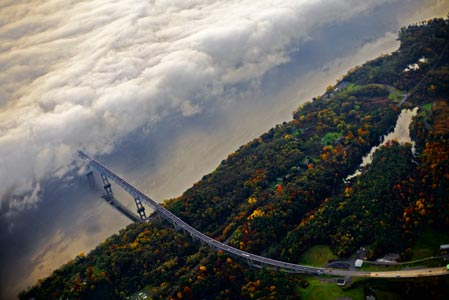
Aerial view of NY 199 as it approaches the Kingston–Rhinecliff Bridge (at left) from the west

The western terminus of Route 199 is the northern terminus of U.S. Route 209 in Ulster County. When the four-lane freeway section of the latter road reaches the cloverleaf interchange with US 9W, in the town of Ulster, between Kingston and Lake Katrine, it assumes the 199 designation as it continues eastward through woodlands. Veering slightly northward, it has another interchange with State Route 32 after a mile (1.6 km), with the eastbound lanes reaching the toll gantry for the Kingston–Rhinecliff Bridge 0.4 miles (640 m) further on.

West of the toll gantry, the highway becomes a two-lane freeway before crossing the 1.5-mile (2.4 km) bridge, on an east-southeast heading. On the east bank, now in the Dutchess County town of Rhinebeck, it remains two lanes as it traverses wooded areas, part of the Hudson River Historic District, a National Historic Landmark. The road returns to a due-east course shortly after the crossing; it becomes a two-lane expressway and has its first traffic light at the intersection with River Road (also County Route 103).

At 0.6 miles (0.97 km) past that intersection, the highway reaches another traffic light at State Route 9G. It joins that highway northbound, immediately entering the town of Red Hook, for a two-mile (3.2 km) stretch through woodlands, first heading northwest then due north. The two lanes widen to four on either side of the Rokeby Road intersection.

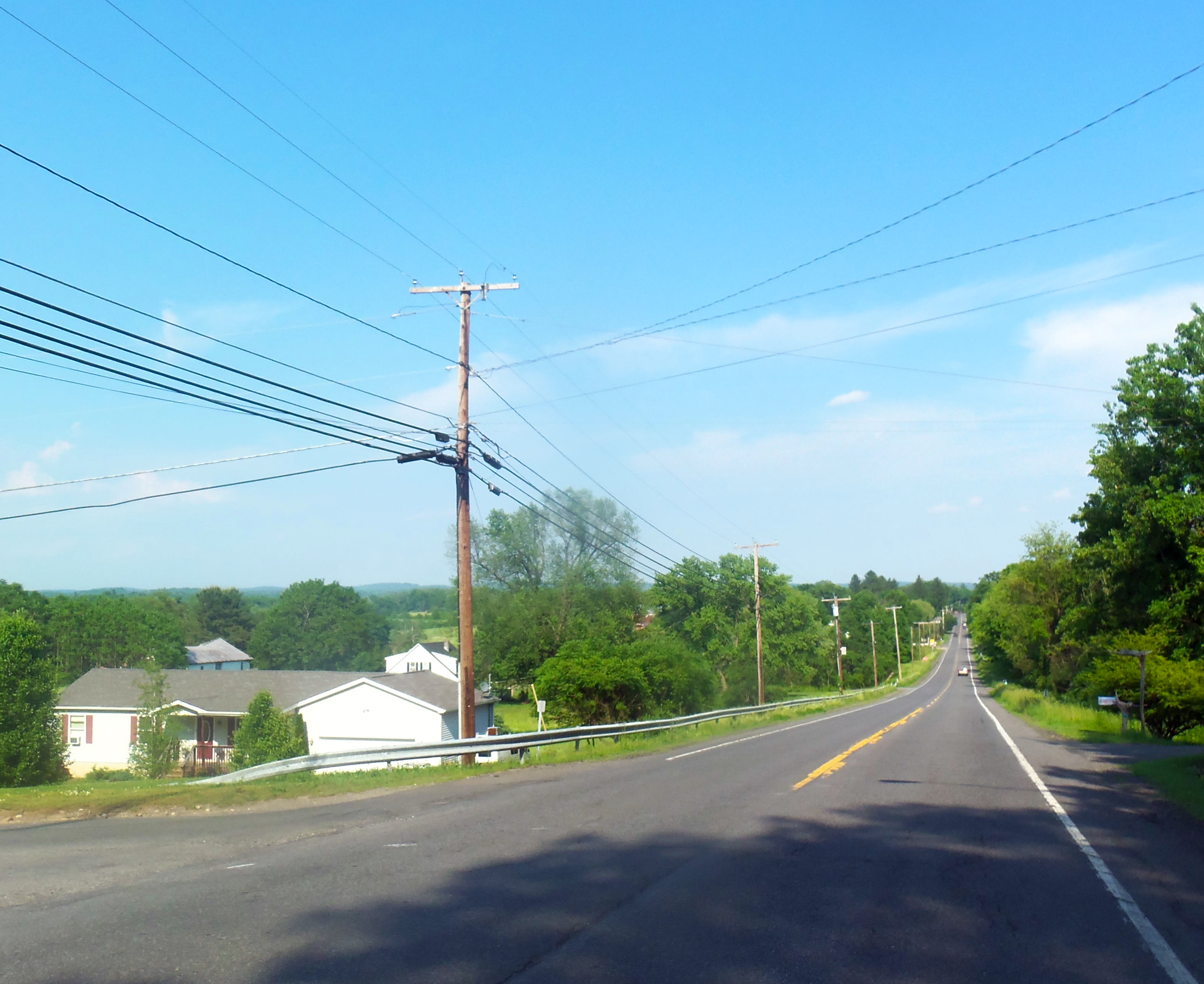
NY 199 approaching Red Hook

The 9G concurrency ends a mile to the north, where the roadway reaches another traffic light after a bend northeast. Here NY 199 turns east, going over a slight rise and then trending slightly southward towards the village of Red Hook. At the village line, a mile east of NY 9G, it passes Red Hook High School, the historic Maizefield estate, and the middle school, becoming West Market Street. At the center of town, another traffic light marks the intersection with U.S. Route 9.

=== Red Hook to Pine Plains ===
NY 199 becomes East Market Street and leaves the village approximately a half-mile (800 m) to the east, curving gently through a mix of fields and woodlots in the surrounding landscape. A mile (1.6 km) past the village, the road makes the first of four crossings of the Saw Kill. After crossing the Lakes Kill a thousand feet (300 m) further on, the road starts a long turn southeastward past the former Sky Park Airport and Red Hook Golf Club.

The Saw Kill crosses again just north of the end of this section, at the small hamlet of Rock City, where the towns of Red Hook, Rhinebeck and Milan meet. State Route 308 has its eastern terminus here, and a signal over the third crossing of the Saw Kill regulates traffic as NY 199 makes the abrupt turn eastward again. A sculpture of an oversized fork marks this "fork in the road". The road and the Saw Kill parallel each other for another mile of rural landscape before the stream makes its final and uppermost crossing just past the Milan Hill Road (County Route 54) intersection on the north side.

Past this point the highway bends southeast again, crossing Little Wappingers Creek, as the landscape becomes hillier and more wooded. A mile and a half further it resumes heading east, past Milan's town hall, to its interchange with the Taconic State Parkway, climbing slightly. East of the Taconic NY 199 crosses the small hamlet of Lafayetteville, turning to the north as it descends for a mile through a narrow, wooded valley to Wilbur Pond and Lafayetteville Multiple Use Area.

For the next two miles NY 199 continues to descend, turning northeast and entering the town of Pine Plains midway. After crossing Ham Brook, the highway turns north northeast for three-quarters of a mile (1.1 km), bending back to the southeast around the side of an unnamed hill. The road returns to an east southeast heading as it descends another mile and the hills abruptly give way to more level ground on the outskirts of central Pine Plains, where NY 199 passes Stissing Mountain High School and becomes West Church Street, still trending south.

=== Pine Plains to Harlem Valley ===
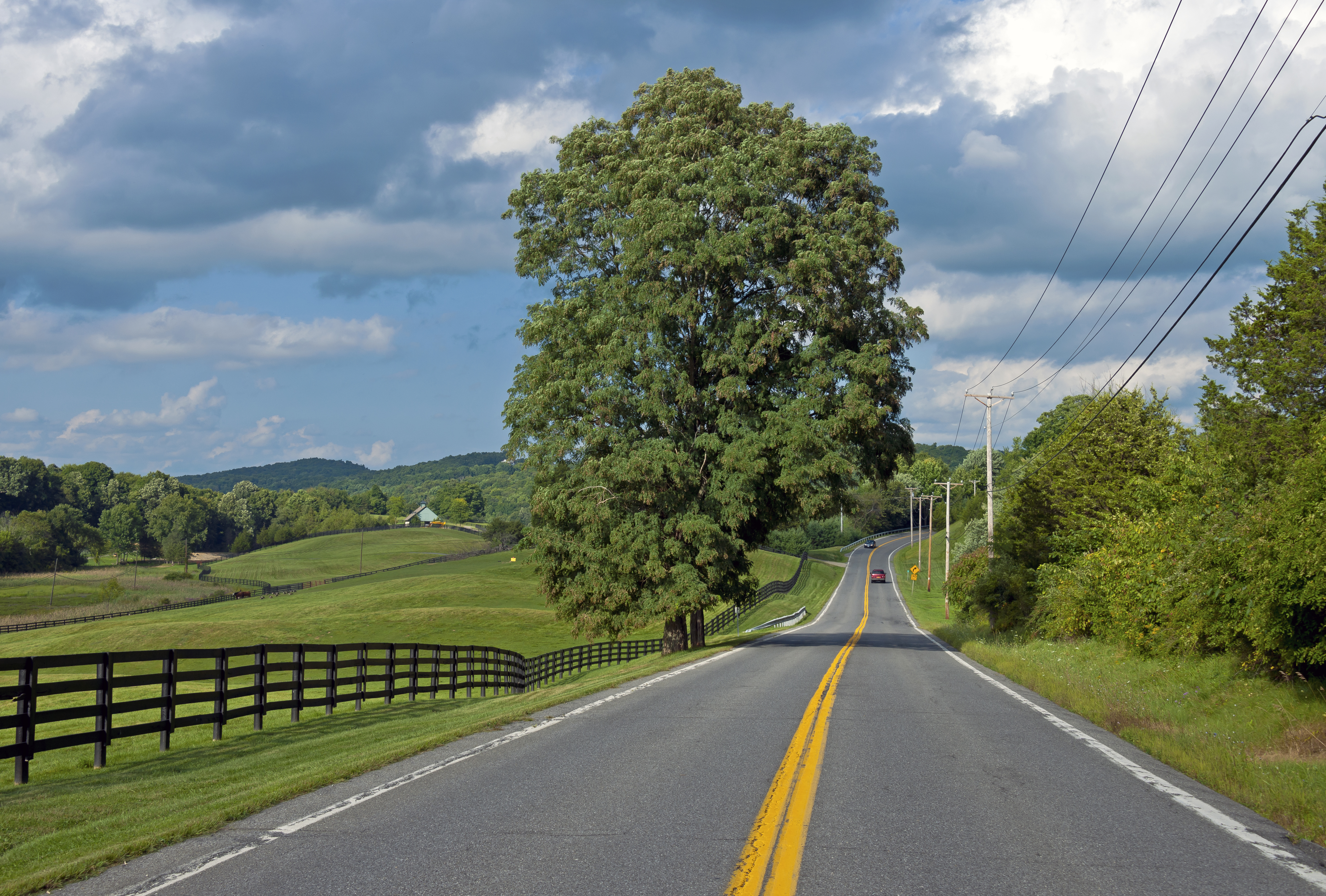
Countryside along NY 199 east of Hammertown

At the junction with Main Street in the center of town, the first traffic light since Rock City also marks where State Route 82 comes in from the south. It forms NY 199's other concurrency when it joins the highway heading eastbound. The joined roads continue together east southeast back into the countryside for the next mile and a half. Just past Pine Plains' town hall, at Hammertown, NY 82 turns north, towards the Columbia County hamlet of Ancram, ending the concurrency.

From this intersection NY 199 turns northeast again briefly, then east, into a landscape of rolling hills, farms and woodlots. Three miles (5 km) of long curves in a generally eastward direction, climbing slightly, it reaches another small hamlet, Pulvers Corners, at an intersection with County Route 59. East of there, the road drops briefly into a swampy area, then climbs again as it turns southeast. At the North East town line, it reaches 1,000 feet (305 m) above sea level, the highest elevation along its route. NY 199 continues southeast down a narrow valley for its last 2.3 miles (3.7 km) to its eastern terminus, at U.S. Route 44 and State Route 22 1.5 miles (2.4 km) southwest of Millerton.

== History ==
=== Origins and designation ===
On April 2, 1802, the New York State Legislature created a turnpike corporation for the purpose of building a road—the Ulster and Delaware Turnpike—from the Susquehanna River in the vicinity of the town of Jericho (now Bainbridge) to the Connecticut state line at Salisbury. The portion of the Ulster and Delaware Turnpike east of the Hudson River was also commonly known as the "Ulster and Salisbury Turnpike" or just the "Salisbury Turnpike". The turnpike crossed the Hudson River from Kingston to Rhinecliff by way of the Kingston–Rhinecliff Ferry and used modern Rhinecliff Road and West Market Street to reach the village of Rhinebeck. East of Rhinebeck, the turnpike passed through the hamlets of Eighmyville, Milan, Lafayetteville, and Pine Plains and the village of Millerton on its way to the Connecticut border. The turnpike corporation operated through the late 19th century.

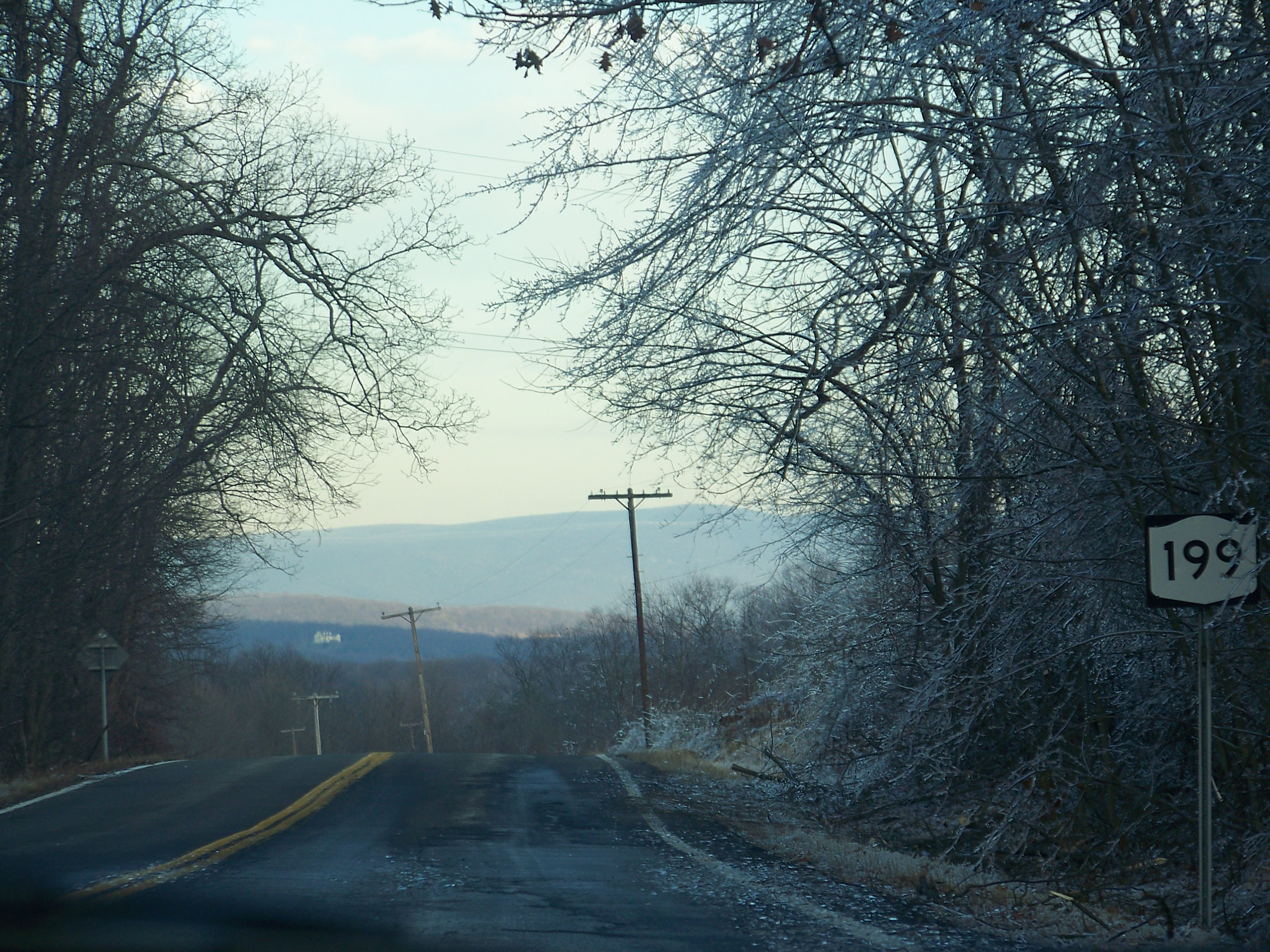
NY 199 after the December 2008 ice storm

In the mid-1920s, the portion of the Ulster and Delaware Turnpike from Lafayetteville to modern NY 22 in North East was designated as part of NY 41, a new route extending from Barrytown, a riverside hamlet 6 miles (10 km) north of Rhinecliff, to North East by way of Red Hook, Lafayetteville, and Pine Plains. The designation lasted for only half a decade as NY 41 was renumbered to NY 199 as part of the 1930 renumbering of state highways in New York.

=== Kingston–Rhinecliff Bridge ===
Initial plans for the Kingston–Rhinecliff Bridge, a structure that replaced the ferry between the two locations, called for the bridge to span the Hudson River between downtown Kingston (at Kingston Point) and the village of Rhinebeck along a corridor similar to that of then-NY 308. Due to political and economic factors, the bridge site was moved 3 miles (5 km) upstream (northward). The partially completed bridge opened to traffic on February 2, 1957, as a realignment and extension of NY 199. The route left its original alignment east of Barrytown and followed NY 9G southward to the eastern bridge approach in the town of Rhinebeck. From there, NY 199 crossed the new bridge and ended at a junction with NY 32 just west of the Hudson River, then the western endpoint of the Kingston bridge approach. An extension of NY 199 west to US 9W was completed in the late 1950s; in 1964 the completion of the Catskill Expressway portion of U.S. Route 209 allowed more direct access from Route 199 and the bridge to the New York State Thruway.

The original routing of NY 199 from the Hudson River at Barrytown to NY 9G remained state-maintained as a reference route for just over two decades. On April 1, 1980, ownership and maintenance of the highway, named Barrytown Road, was transferred from the state of New York to Dutchess County as part of a highway maintenance swap between the two levels of government. Barrytown Road is now designated as CR 82.

== Major intersections ==
County	Location	mi	km	Destinations	Notes
Ulster	Ulster	0.00	0.00	US 209 south – Ellenville	Continuation south
Ulster	Ulster	0.00	0.00	US 9W – Kingston, Saugerties	Cloverleaf interchange
Ulster	Ulster	0.98	1.58	NY 32 – Kingston, Saugerties	Parclo interchange; last eastbound exit before toll
Hudson River		1.37– 3.00	2.20– 4.83	Kingston–Rhinecliff Bridge (eastbound toll)	
Dutchess	Town of Rhinebeck	4.44	7.15	Eastern end of limited-access section	
Dutchess	Town of Rhinebeck	4.44	7.15	NY 9G south – Rhinebeck, Dutchess County Fairgrounds	Western end of NY 9G concurrency
Dutchess	Town of Red Hook	6.39	10.28	NY 9G north – Germantown, Hudson	Eastern end of NY 9G concurrency
Dutchess	Village of Red Hook	8.15	13.12	US 9 – Hudson, Rhinebeck	
Dutchess	Milan	11.91	19.17	NY 308 west – Rhinebeck	Eastern terminus of NY 308; hamlet of Rock City
Dutchess	Milan	15.63	25.15	Taconic State Parkway – New York City, Albany	Parclo interchange; exit 67 on Taconic State Parkway; hamlet of Lafayetteville
Dutchess	Town of Pine Plains	22.58	36.34	NY 82 south – Millbrook	Western end of NY 82 concurrency; hamlet of Pine Plains
Dutchess	Town of Pine Plains	24.01	38.64	NY 82 north – Ancram	Eastern end of NY 82 concurrency
Dutchess	North East	30.91	49.74	US 44 / NY 22 – Millerton, Amenia, Millbrook	Eastern terminus
1.000 mi = 1.609 km; 1.000 km = 0.621 mi: Concurrency terminus; Electronic toll collection

== See also ==
- List of county routes in Dutchess County, New York
- New York State Bicycle Route 199
