= Milan, New York =

- Town
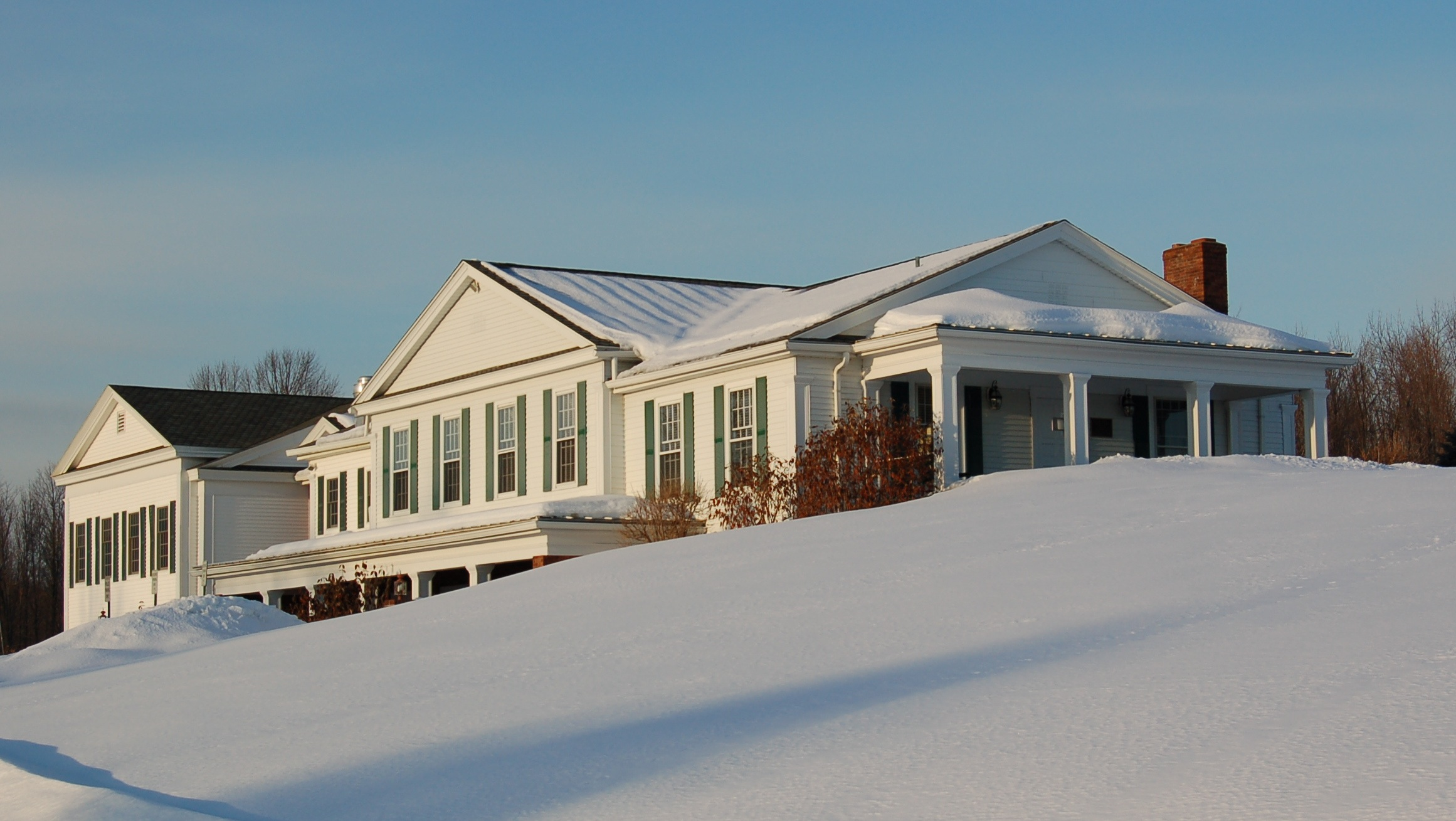
- Wilcox Memorial Town Hall, Route 199, Milan

- Left: Map of Dutchess County, New York with Milan highlighted. Right: Map of New York State with Dutchess County highlighted.
- Coordinates: 41°58′40″N 73°46′50″W
- Country: United States
- State: New York
- County: Dutchess

Government
  - Type: Town Council
  - Town Supervisor: Al LoBrutto (D)
  - Town Council: Members' List: • Douglas Raelson (D); • Debra Blalock (D); • Bill Jeffway (D); • Jack Campisi (D)

Area
  - Total: 36.58 sq mi (94.73 km^{2})
  - Land: 36.11 sq mi (93.52 km^{2})
  - Water: 0.47 sq mi (1.21 km^{2})
- Elevation: 551 ft (168 m)

Population (2020)
  - Total: 2,245
  - Density: 64.8/sq mi (25.01/km^{2})
- Time zone: UTC-5 (Eastern (EST))
  - Summer (DST): UTC-4 (EDT)
- ZIP codes: 12571 (Red Hook); 12572 (Rhinebeck); 12514 (Clinton Corners); 12581 (Stanfordville)
- Area code: 845
- FIPS code: 36-027-47207
- GNIS feature ID: 0979218
- Website: www.milan-ny.gov

Milan (/ˈmaɪlɪn/ MY-lin) is a town in Dutchess County, New York, United States. As of the 2020 census it had a population of 2,245, slightly down from 2,370 in 2010. Milan is located approximately 90 miles (140 km) north of New York City, 60 miles (97 km) south of Albany, and 150 miles (240 km) west of Boston. It is bordered by Rhinebeck and Red Hook to the west, Pine Plains to the east, Stanford to the southeast, Clinton to the south, and Gallatin to the north by Columbia County. The only major route in the town is the historic Taconic State Parkway, though NY 199 serves as the main local thoroughfare.

== History ==
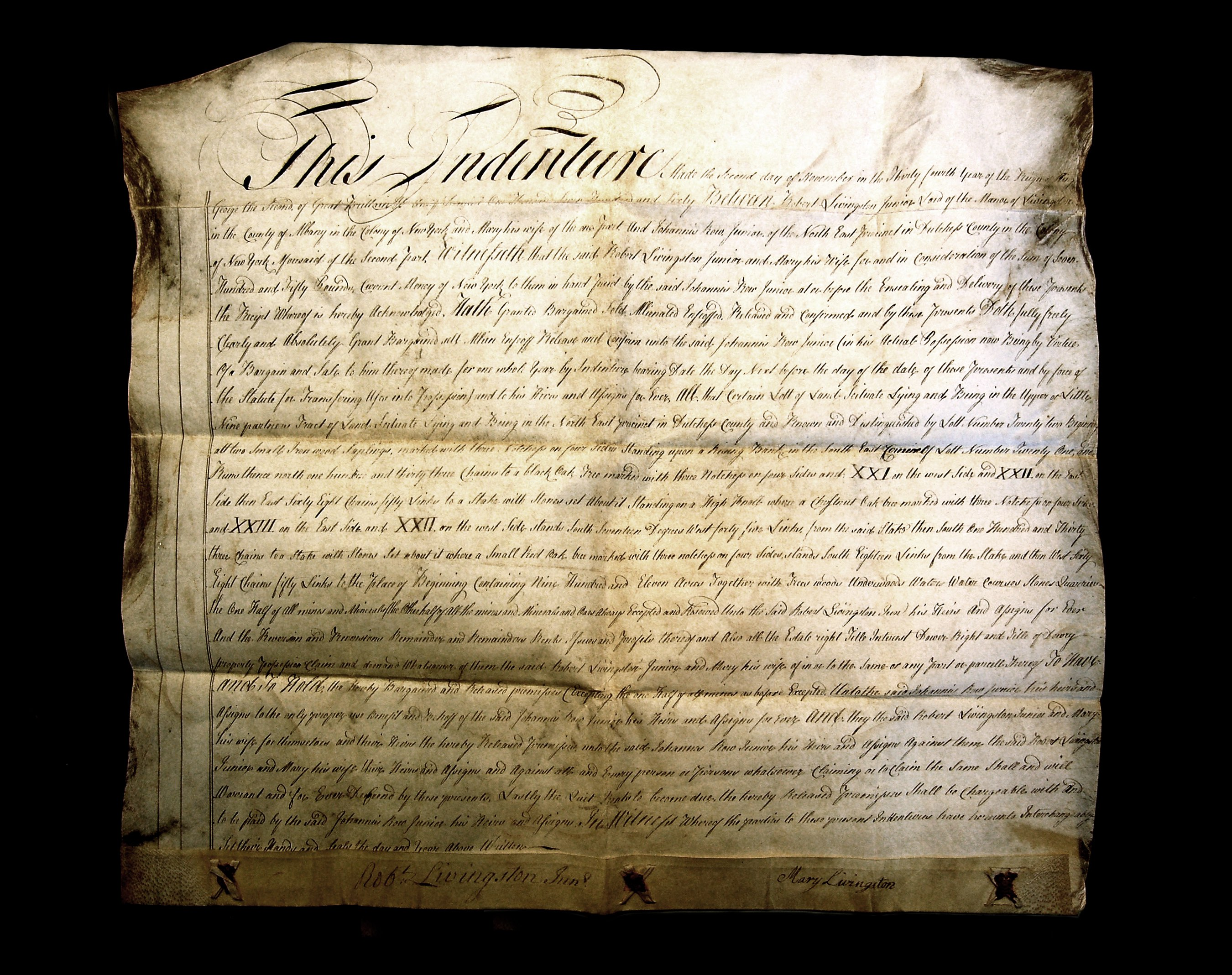
This 1760 deed transferring 911 acres from Robert Livingston, 3rd Lord of the Manor to Johannes Rowe Jr., is the first land sale.

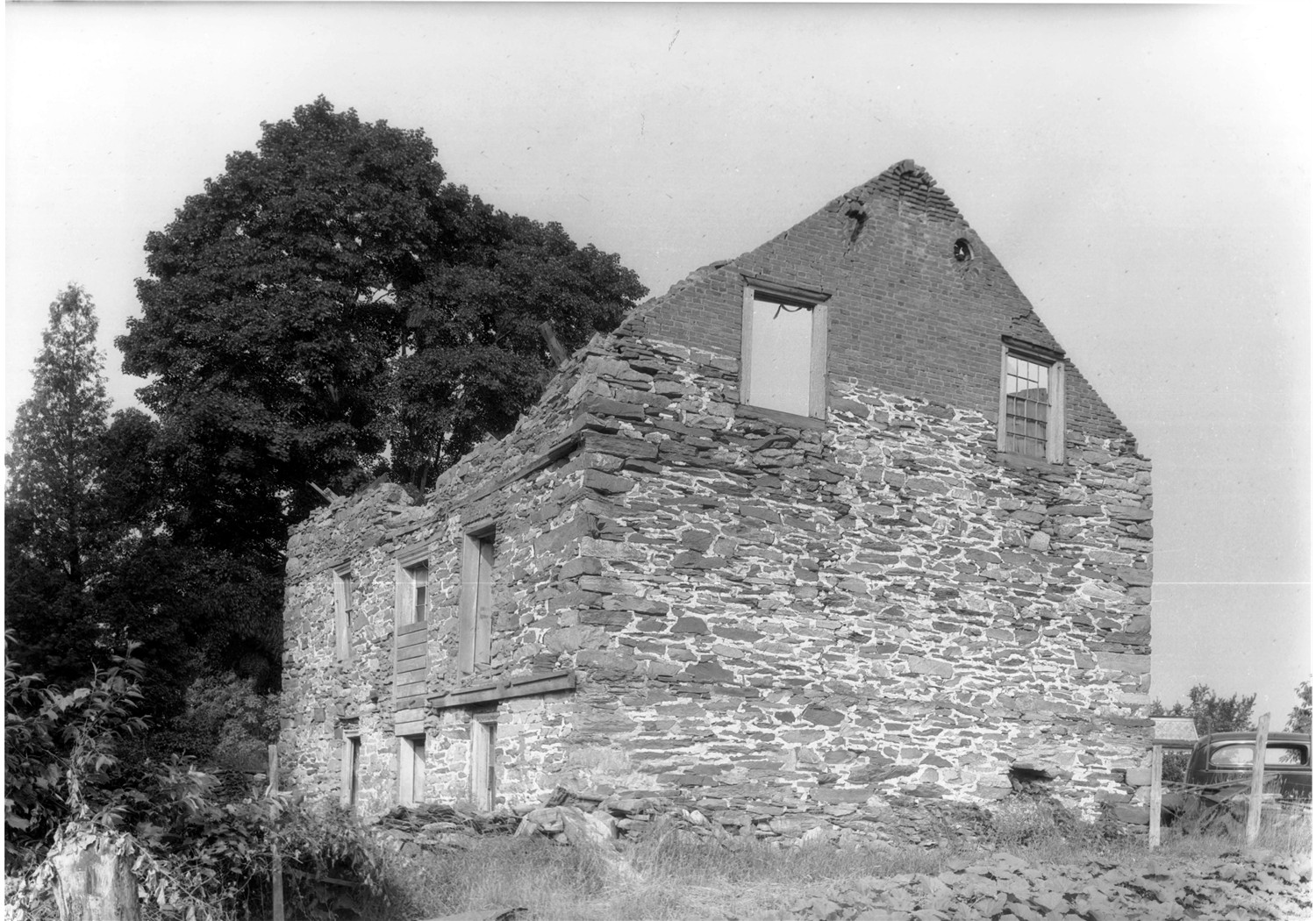
Johannes Rowe Jr. built this house c. 1766. Photographed in 1940, it was taken down shortly thereafter.

The area that comprises Milan today was the western part of the Little Nine Partners Patent of 1706. Milan was largely a farming and mill town and remains very rural.

The first settler in the area was Johannes Rowe. The son of a Palatine immigrant, Rowe bought 911 acres (3.69 km^{2}) from Robert Livingston, 3rd Lord of the Manor of Livingston, and built a stone house in 1766 on what is now Rowe Road near the Milan Town Hall. The remains of the house were photographed in 1940 for the Historic American Buildings Survey.

=== Establishment of town and post office ===
The New York State Legislature voted on March 6, 1818, to create the town of Milan from the western part of the town of North East, to be effective "from and after the last day in March" 1818. The session laws stated that the first town meeting would be held the first Tuesday of April and at the home of Stephen Thorn, who was elected town supervisor along with John F. Bartlett, town clerk.

Two 19th-century histories of the town of Milan and Dutchess County (1877 and 1882) state there is no knowledge or evidence as to why the name "Milan" was chosen, but the name Milan had appeared in other areas of the state, and it was not unusual to take European city names at the time. What is now the city of Syracuse was known as "Milan" for a brief period between 1809 and 1812. A settlement 40 miles (64 km) south of Syracuse was originally called "Milan" in 1790 before incorporation in 1802 as the town of Locke. An unincorporated village there continued to be referred to as "Milan" but the Milan designation for that post office was changed to "Locke" on July 29, 1817. This cleared the way for the operation of the Milan post office on August 14, 1818, at what is now Case's Corners.

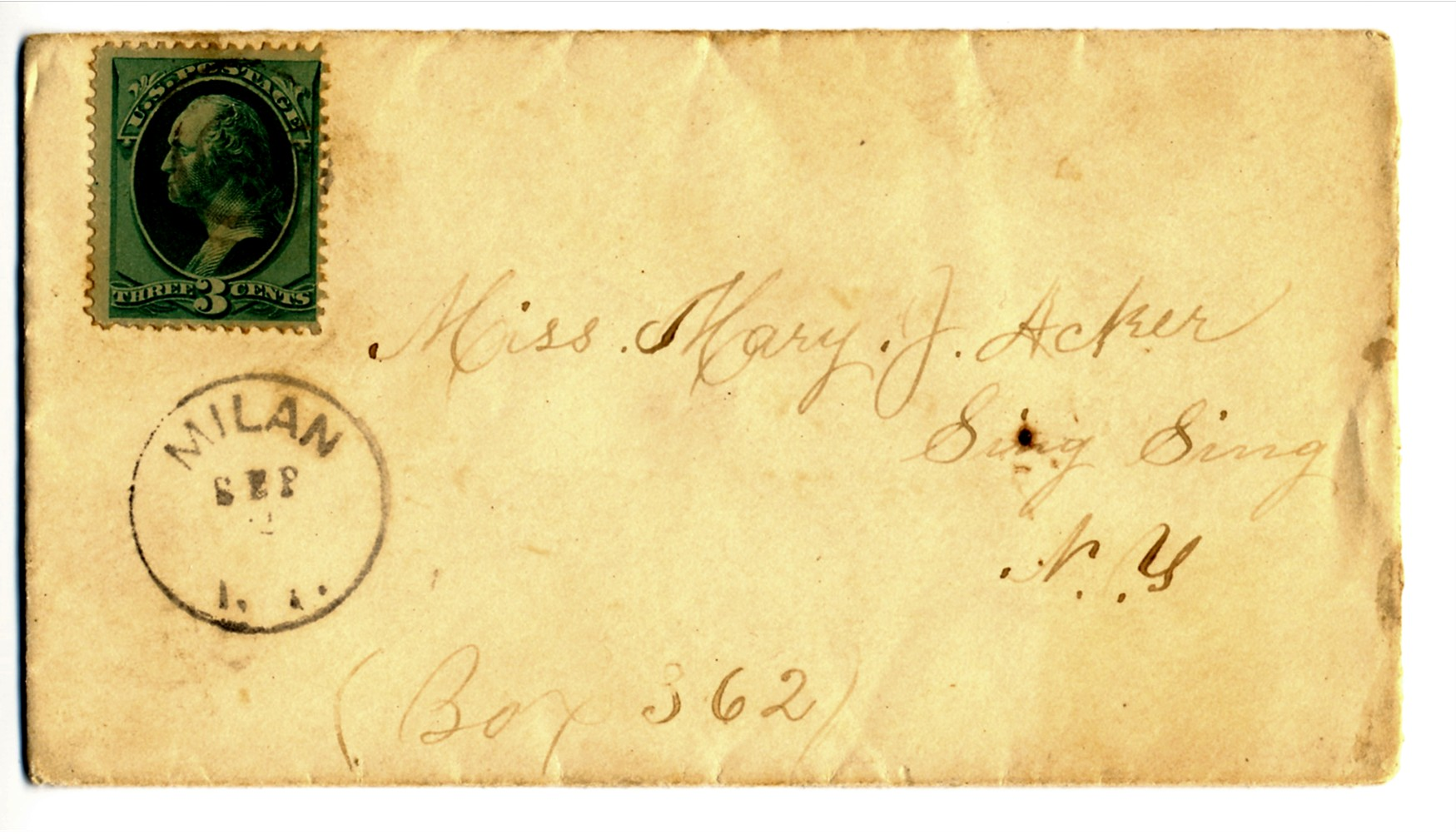
The Milan post office operated from 1818 to 1908 at what is now Case's Corner. A rare cancellation shown above.

=== A town "in-between" ===
The main thoroughfares for the community ran from the Hudson River to Salisbury, Connecticut, and travelers referred to the road as the "turnpike." It later became recognized as the Salisbury Turnpike, and sections of the road still exist today and bear that name.

In addition to farming and local mills in Milan, lead and iron were mined in areas around what is now Millerton, New York, and Salisbury, Connecticut, which was then brought to Livingston's furnaces at Ancram in Columbia County. Milan was "in-between" those towns and the river and as a result had a great deal of important commercial traffic going east–west through the town.

=== Remains least populous town ===
The early population peaked in 1840 at 1,745 residents and went into decline until 1930 with only 622 residents. It was the opening of the Erie Canal (1825) and then the development of the railroad and the move to river cities and the western migration that caused the decline. Also, Milan's soil was hilly and rocky and tough to farm. Then following the 1930s and the Great Depression the population grew again, due in part to the construction of the Taconic Parkway, which ended in Milan at the time, and then the post-World War II boom.

The 1840 population level was reached again in 1980, some 140 years later. From the 1980s to the turn of the new century, Milan was one of the fastest-growing towns in Dutchess County. However, it remains the least-populous town in the county.

=== State historic markers ===
Partial list of New York State historic markers in Milan:

- Jackson Corners—Colonial Inn: built about 1773 Stage Inn, doctor's office, hotel, store, post office of Jackson Corners.
- Jackson Corners—Nobletown Road: running from post road in Livingston, through Gallatin, Ancram, state line, Nobletown, to Barrington, N.H. In use before 1798.
- Turkey Hill Road—Fulton Homestead: John Fulton, first owner. Deed recorded October 12, 1795, has always been in possession of the Fulton family. In Fulton name Until 1933.
- Turkey Hill Road—Burial Ground: Chief Crow and other Mohican shacomecos of Moravian faith buried here. Last burial about 1850.

== Geography and roads ==
According to the United States Census Bureau the town has a total area of 36.6 square miles (94.7 km^{2}), of which 36.1 square miles (93.5 km^{2}) is land and 0.46 square miles (1.2 km^{2}), or 1.28%, is water.

The northern town line is the border of Columbia County.

The Taconic State Parkway runs north–south along the eastern part of the town. The entire highway and its supporting structures are listed on the National Register of Historic Places.

New York State Route 199 runs east–west through the town of Milan, going to Red Hook and over the Kingston–Rhinecliff Bridge to the west. It is the direct route to Pine Plains and Millerton to the east.

== Parks and recreation ==
The New York State Department of Environmental Conservation owns, manages and maintains two Multiple Use Areas in Milan. Both are east of the Taconic State Parkway.

The Lafayetteville Multiple Use Area comprises 769 acres (3.11 km^{2}), with an entrance on Route 199 between the Taconic State Parkway and New York State Route 82.

The Roeliff Jansen Kill Multiple Use Area is 125 acres (0.51 km^{2}) and is accessed from a pull-off on the east side of the Taconic State Parkway near the Roeliff Jansen Kill.

Dutchess County owns, manages and maintains the 615-acre (2.49 km^{2}) Wilcox Memorial Park on Route 199, 3.4 miles (5.5 km) east of the Taconic State Parkway.

The town of Milan owns, manages and maintains the Milan Rec Park on South Road. It contains a softball field and children's play area, and has a trail maintained by the Milaners Youth Group. It is also the location of the recycling and transfer station.

Dutchess County Tourism describes a scenic driving tour that includes the town.

== Development ==
In 2002 the Durst Organization, largely known for its high-rise developments in Manhattan, bought 2,300 acres (9.3 km^{2}) that straddles the town of Milan and Pine Plains, with plans to create a second home and recreational community. The original proposal included almost 1,000 homes along with golf courses. Durst's January 2010 revised plans would allow for 624 homes (572 in Pine Plains and 52 in Milan).

By 2002 Red Wing Sand and Gravel of East Fishkill had bought two large parcels in the northern part of Milan (269 acres (1.09 km^{2}) on Turkey Hill Road and 163 acres (0.66 km^{2}) on Academy Hill Road) with a view to operating two large-scale mines. But on March 30, 2010, the New York Supreme Court ruled in favor of the Town of Milan and its town-wide ban on mining. The town was defended successfully by the office of the New York Attorney General, preventing the mining company from proceeding to develop mines at those locations.

== Demographics ==
Historical population
Census	Pop.	Note	%±
1820	1,797		—
1830	1,886		5.0%
1840	1,725		−8.5%
1850	1,764		2.3%
1860	1,522		−13.7%
1870	1,474		−3.2%
1880	1,275		−13.5%
1890	1,026		−19.5%
1900	950		−7.4%
1910	893		−6.0%
1920	704		−21.2%
1930	622		−11.6%
1940	695		11.7%
1950	806		16.0%
1960	944		17.1%
1970	1,322		40.0%
1980	1,668		26.2%
1990	1,895		13.6%
2000	2,356		24.3%
2010	2,370		0.6%
2020	2,245		−5.3%
U.S. Decennial Census

As of the census of 2010, there were 2,370 people, 964 households, and 650 families residing in the town. The population density was 65.7 inhabitants per square mile (25.4/km^{2}). There were 1,279 housing units at an average density of 35.4 per square mile (13.7/km^{2}). The racial makeup of the town was 95.3% white, 1.9% African American, 0.5% Native American, .5% Asian, .04% Pacific Islander, .8% some other race, and 1.1% from two or more races. Hispanic or Latino of any race were 4.4% of the population.

There were 964 households, out of which 30.6% had children under the age of 18 living with them, 55.0% were headed by married couples living together, 7.3% had a female householder with no husband present, and 32.6% were non-families. 24.5% of all households were made up of individuals, and 9.1% were someone living alone who was 65 years of age or older. The average household size was 2.45, and the average family size was 2.94.

In the town, the population was spread out, with 22.0% under the age of 18, 6.6% from 18 to 24, 20.5% from 25 to 44, 36.4% from 45 to 64, and 14.6% who were 65 years of age or older. The median age was 45.6 years. For every 100 females, there were 106.4 males. For every 100 females age 18 and over, there were 105.6 males.

For the period 2009 through 2013, the estimated median annual income for a household in the town was $65,529, and the median income for a family was $77,396. Male full-time workers had a median income of $58,333 versus $45,489 for females. The per capita income for the town was $37,627. About 3.1% of families and 3.0% of the population were below the poverty line, including 2.6% of those under age 18 and 1.5% of those age 65 or over.

== Locations ==
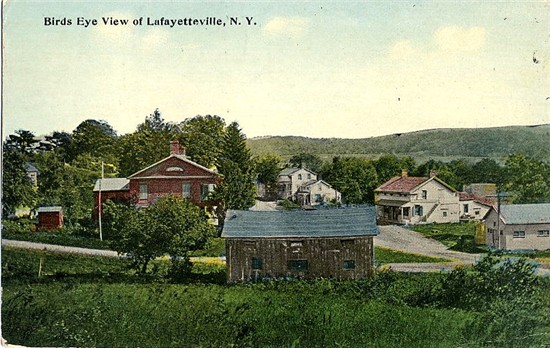
Lafayetteville in 1918

- Jackson Corners – in the northeastern part of town on the Roeliff Jansen Kill. Jackson Corners post office was operated from 1835 to 1860, and 1862 to 1930. In 1840, it had one church and 25 houses.
- Lafayetteville – a hamlet east of Milan village, formerly called Lafayetter Corners. It was named after the Marquis de Lafayette, who visited the area in 1824. The post office was operated from 1849 to 1903.
- Milanville – location of the Milan post office from 1818 to 1908. At the junction of Salisbury Turnpike and Milan Hollow Road, this area is now known as "Case's Corner" after Rensselaer Case.
- Rock City – a hamlet west of Milan village; had a grist and sawmill and 20 houses in 1840. It was formerly Travers Mill. A post office was operated from 1835 to 1904.
- Shookville – a former community in the northwestern part of the town founded by Jacob Shook. A post office was operated from 1827 to 1835.

== Notable people ==
- Jane Marsh Parker (1836-1913), author, historian, clubwoman
