= Kingston–Rhinecliff Bridge =

Bridge in New York, United States

George Clinton Kingston–Rhinecliff Bridge
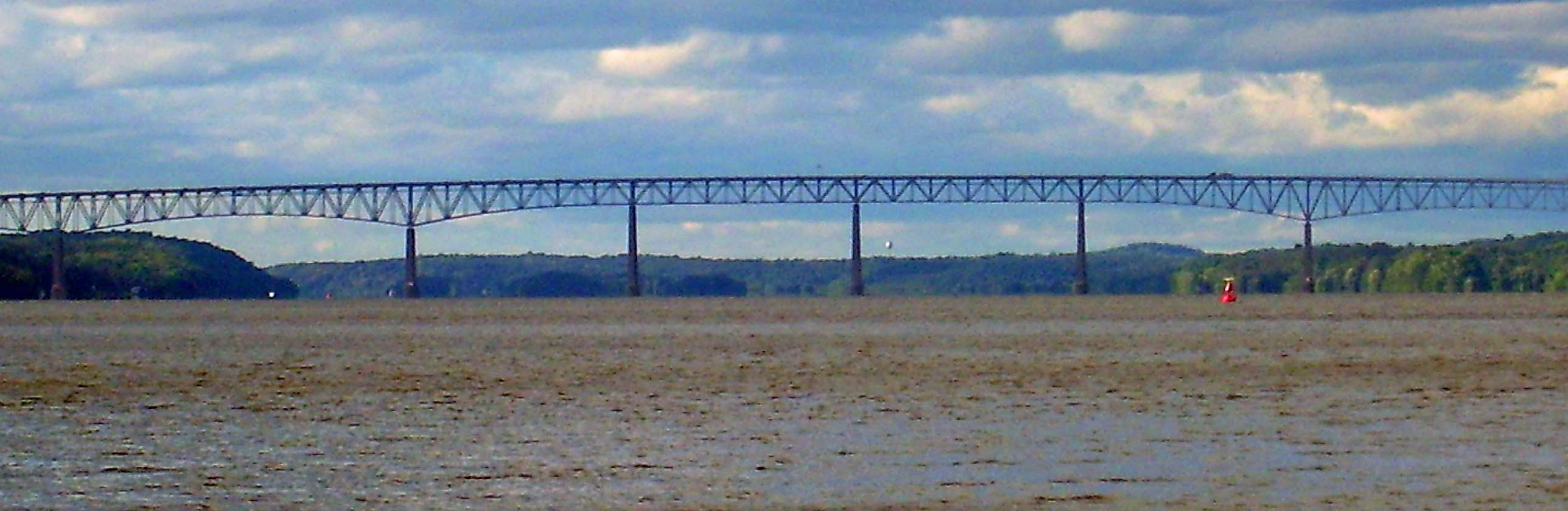
- Coordinates: 41.9776°N 73.94625°W
- Carries: 2 lanes of NY 199
- Crosses: Hudson River
- Locale: Kingston, New York and Rhinecliff, New York
- Official name: George Clinton Kingston–Rhinecliff Bridge
- Maintained by: New York State Bridge Authority

Characteristics
- Design: Continuous under-deck truss bridge
- Total length: 7,793 ft (2375 m)
- Width: 2 lanes with shoulders
- Longest span: 2 × 800 ft (244 m)
- Clearance below: 152 ft (46.3m) above river

History
- Opened: February 2, 1957; 69 years ago

Statistics
- Toll: (Eastbound only) cars: $1.65 E-ZPass $2.15 tolls-by-mail

Location
- Interactive map of George Clinton Kingston–Rhinecliff Bridge

The George Clinton Kingston–Rhinecliff Bridge is a continuous under-deck truss toll bridge that carries NY 199 across the Hudson River in New York State north of the City of Kingston and the hamlet of Rhinecliff. It was opened to traffic on February 2, 1957, as a two-lane (one in each direction) bridge, although it was not actually complete. The formal opening was May 11, 1957. The original cost was $17.5 million.

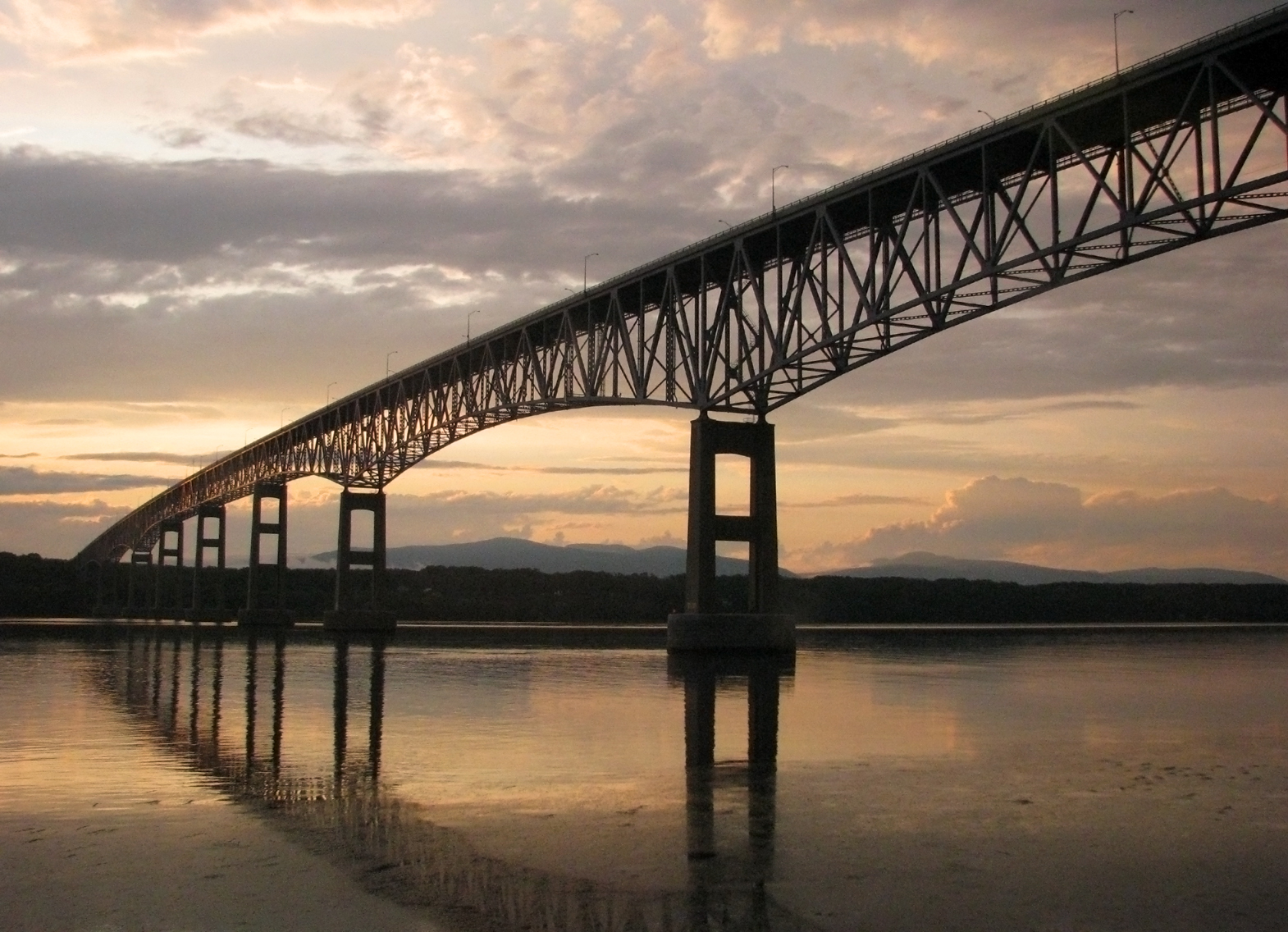
Bridge seen from Eastern shore of the Hudson River

The bridge, owned by the New York State Bridge Authority (NYSBA), carries two lanes of traffic and approximately 17,000 vehicles per day. It was designed by David B. Steinman and the builders were Harris Structural Steel and Merritt-Chapman & Scott Corporation, and is the second northernmost, and second newest, of the five bridges that NYSBA owns and operates. The bridge has two main spans, since there is an east and west channel in the Hudson River at this point.

== Development ==
Planning for a bridge in this general area to replace the ferry service, which was viewed as sporadic and unreliable (there were no Hudson bridges for a half-hour or more drive time in either direction), began in the early 1940s. The site for the bridge, as originally proposed, was between Kingston Point and downtown Rhinebeck, and the design was initially a suspension bridge almost identical in appearance to the Mid-Hudson Bridge. When the site was relocated about 3 miles (4.8 km) northward, there was no stable bedrock for anchorages, so the design was changed to a continuous under-deck truss. Construction commenced in 1954. When the Newburgh-Beacon Bridge was proposed, provisions were inserted in the enabling legislation that construction on that bridge could not commence until the Kingston–Rhinecliff was completed.

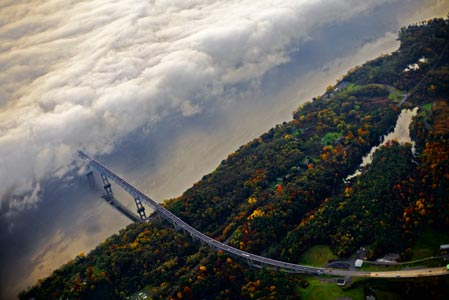
Eastward commuters drive into fog which covers the Rhinecliff half of the Kingston–Rhinecliff Bridge on a fall morning

Like all NYSBA bridges, the Kingston–Rhinecliff is a toll bridge, with the toll collected only for eastbound vehicles. Originally, tolls were collected in both directions. In August 1970, the toll was abolished for westbound drivers, and at the same time, eastbound drivers saw their tolls doubled. The tolls of eleven other New York–New Jersey and Hudson River crossings along a 130-mile (210 km) stretch, from the Outerbridge Crossing in the south to the Rip Van Winkle Bridge in the north, were also changed to eastbound-only at that time.

In 2000 the state ceremonially renamed the bridge after George Clinton, New York's first Governor, fourth Vice President of the United States and a resident of the Hudson Valley.

In late 2019, a pedestrian path was added to the bridge. It is 4 feet wide, separated from traffic by a 3-foot-high barrier. The path is part of the Empire State Trail project. The path is on the south side of the bridge, next to eastbound traffic. It is for pedestrians only; bicyclists on the span will continue to be required to use the shoulders of the road.

At midnight on December 1, 2021, the bridge was converted to all-electronic tolling in the eastbound direction and the toll plazas were dismantled. At the same time, the road heading towards the bridge was narrowed to two lanes, and a turn lane was added in the other direction.

== Tolls ==
In 2019, the bridge authority announced that tolls on its Hudson River crossings would increase each year beginning in 2020 and ending in 2023. As of May 1, 2021, the current toll for passenger cars traveling eastbound on the Kingston–Rhinecliff Bridge was $1.75 in cash, $1.45 for E-ZPass users. In May 2022, tolls will rise to $1.55 for E-ZPass users and $2 for cash payers. In 2023, the E-ZPass toll increased to $1.65, and the cash toll rose to $2.15. No toll is collected for westbound traffic.

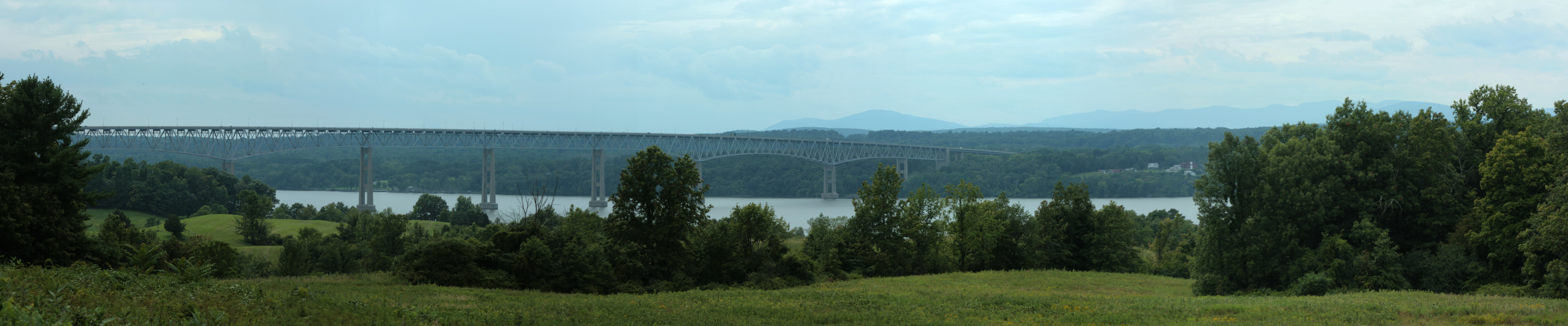
Bridge seen from Kingston Point

== See also ==
- List of fixed crossings of the Hudson River
