= Rhinebeck (town), New York =

Rhinebeck, New York
- Town
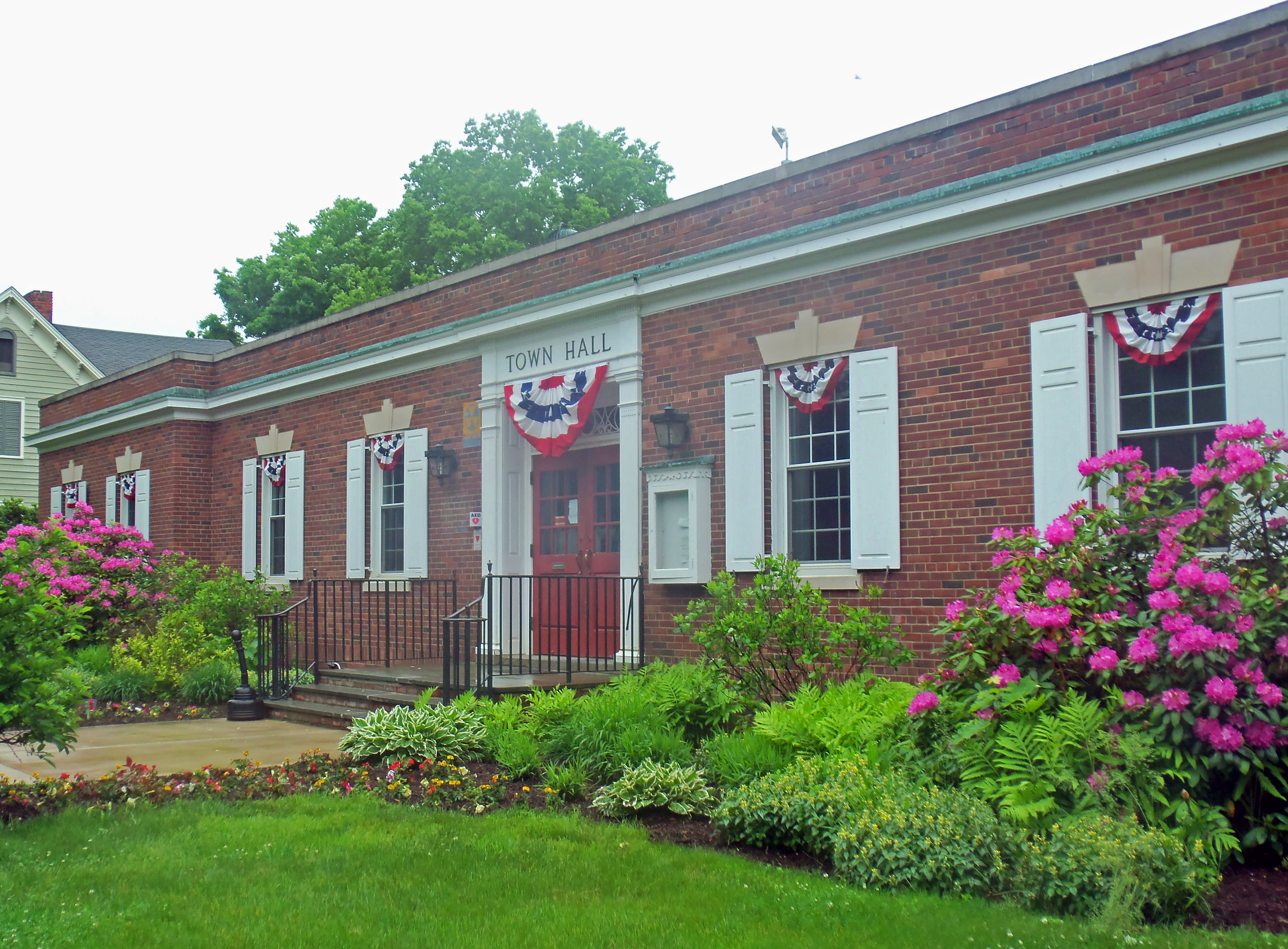
- Rhinebeck Town Hall

- Seal

- Location of Rhinebeck, New York
- Coordinates: 41°55′39″N 73°54′32″W
- Country: United States
- State: New York
- County: Dutchess

Government
  - Type: Town Council
  - Town Supervisor: Elizabeth Spinzia (D)
  - Town Council: Members' List: • Allan Scherr (D); • Josh Pulver (D); • Ed Roberts (D); • Chauncey Walker (D)

Area
  - Total: 39.8 sq mi (103.1 km^{2})
  - Land: 35.7 sq mi (92.5 km^{2})
  - Water: 4.1 sq mi (10.6 km^{2})
- Elevation: 200 ft (61 m)

Population (2020)
  - Total: 7,596
  - Density: 213/sq mi (82.1/km^{2})
- Time zone: UTC-5 (Eastern (EST))
  - Summer (DST): UTC-4 (EDT)
- ZIP Codes: 12572 (Rhinebeck); 12574 (Rhinecliff)
- Area code: 845
- FIPS code: 36-61357
- GNIS feature ID: 0962436
- Website: www.rhinebeckny.gov

Rhinebeck is a town in Dutchess County, New York, United States. The population was 7,596 at the 2020 census. It is part of the Kiryas Joel–Poughkeepsie–Newburgh metropolitan area as well as the larger New York metropolitan area.

The town of Rhinebeck is in the northwestern part of Dutchess County in the Hudson Valley. "Rhinebeck" also refers to the village of Rhinebeck, located within the town. Rhinebeck residents living within the village are citizens of the town as well, but town residents living outside of the village line are not citizens of the village.

U.S. Route 9 passes through the town. It also includes the hamlet of Rhinecliff, which has an Amtrak station with service to Burlington, Montreal, Toronto, Chicago, Cleveland, Buffalo, Albany, and New York City.

Rhinebeck is home of the Dutchess County Fair.

== Geography ==
According to the United States Census Bureau, the town has a total area of 39.8 square miles (103.1 km^{2}), of which 35.7 square miles (92.5 km^{2}) is land and 4.1 square miles (10.6 km^{2}), or 10.24%, is water.

The western town line, marked by the Hudson River, is the border of Ulster County. Neighboring Dutchess County towns are Red Hook to the north, Milan and Clinton to the east, and Hyde Park to the south.

== Demographics ==
Historical population
Census	Pop.	Note	%±
2000	7,762		—
2010	7,548		−2.8%
2020	7,596		0.6%

As of the census of 2000, there were 7,762 people, 3,001 households, and 1,797 families residing in the town. The population density was 214.1 inhabitants per square mile (82.7/km^{2}). There were 3,255 housing units at an average density of 89.8 per square mile (34.7/km^{2}). The racial makeup of the town was 92.5% white, 3.61% African American, .09% Native American, 1.37% Asian, 1.17% from other races, and 1.26% from two or more races. Hispanic or Latino of any race were 3.94% of the population.

There were 3,001 households, out of which 25.9% had children under the age of 18 living with them, 50.2% were married couples living together, 7.1% had a female householder with no husband present, and 40.1% were non-families. 34% of all households were made up of individuals, and 15.2% had someone living alone who was 65 years of age or older. The average household size was 2.22 and the average family size was 2.87.

In the town, the population was spread out, with 20.3% under the age of 18, 5.8% from 18 to 24, 25.4% from 25 to 44, 25.7% from 45 to 64, and 22.8% who were 65 years of age or older. The median age was 44 years. For every 100 females, there were 91.5 males. For every 100 females age 18 and over, there were 84.1 males.

The median income for a household in the town was $52,679, and the median income for a family was $67,837. Males had a median income of $49,028 versus $31,995 for females. The per capita income for the town was $29,069. About 3.1% of families and 9.7% of the population were below the poverty line, including 6.9% of those under age 18 and 5.6% of those age 65 or over.

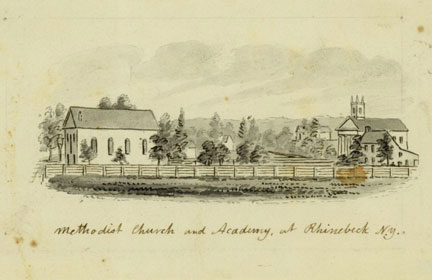
The Methodist Church and Academy at Rhinebeck, N.Y. (circa 1856-1860) by John Warner Barber

In 1941, in Rhinebeck, a set of four historic panoramas of London, dating from about 1810, were found lining a barrel of pistols. The Rhinebeck panorama was acquired by the Museum of London in 1998.

== Notable people ==
- John Jacob Astor IV (1864–1912), millionaire businessman, real estate builder, inventor, writer born in Rhinebeck; died in the sinking of the RMS Titanic
- Hilarie Burton, actress known for her role on One Tree Hill, lives in Rhinebeck with her husband Jeffrey Dean Morgan.
- Gerrit Graham (1948-2026), film, television, and stage actor (Phantom of the Paradise, Demon Seed, Used Cars), lived in Rhinebeck
- Savannah Guthrie (born 1971), currently anchor for Today show on NBC
- Dorothy Knapp (artist) (1907–1986), artist who designed commercial first day covers
- Annie Leibovitz (born 1949), photographer
- Mark Linn-Baker (born 1954), actor
- Joseph Mazzello (born 1983), actor born in Rhinebeck
- Jeffrey Dean Morgan (born 1966), actor who built his home in Rhinebeck and co-owns a sweet shop there with friend Paul Rudd
- Charles B. Wessler (born 1955), movie producer (Dumb & Dumber, There’s Something About Mary, Green Book), lives in Rhinebeck
- Cole Palen (1925–1993), founder and former owner of the Old Rhinebeck Aerodrome living aviation museum
- Steve Rikert (born 1969), racing driver born in Rhinebeck
- Emma Roberts (born 1991), actress born in Rhinebeck
- Paul Rudd (born 1969), actor, lives in Rhinebeck and co-owns a sweet shop there with his friend Jeffrey Dean Morgan.
- Oliver Sacks (1933-2015), neurologist and author, had a second home in Rhinebeck
- Anthony "Fat Tony" Salerno (1911–1992), former head of the Genovese crime family, spent most of his time at his 100-acre (0.40 km^{2}) Rhinebeck horse farm during the 1970s and 1980s, before his incarceration
- William Seabrook (1884– 1945), explorer and author, committed suicide in Rhinebeck
- Lorraine Toussaint, actress
- Rufus Wainwright, singer-songwriter born in Rhinebeck

== Communities and locations in the town of Rhinebeck ==
- Eighmyville—a location northeast of Rhinebeck village.
- Ellerslie—a location in the southwestern part of the town near the Hudson River.
- Rhinebeck, the eponymous village.
- Rhinecliff—a hamlet on the east bank of the Hudson River.
- Weys Corners—a location in the northeastern part of the town.
- Württemberg—a hamlet in the southeastern part of the town.
