= Oliver Barrett House =

Historic house in New York, United States

- U.S. National Register of Historic Places
- U.S. Historic district – Contributing property
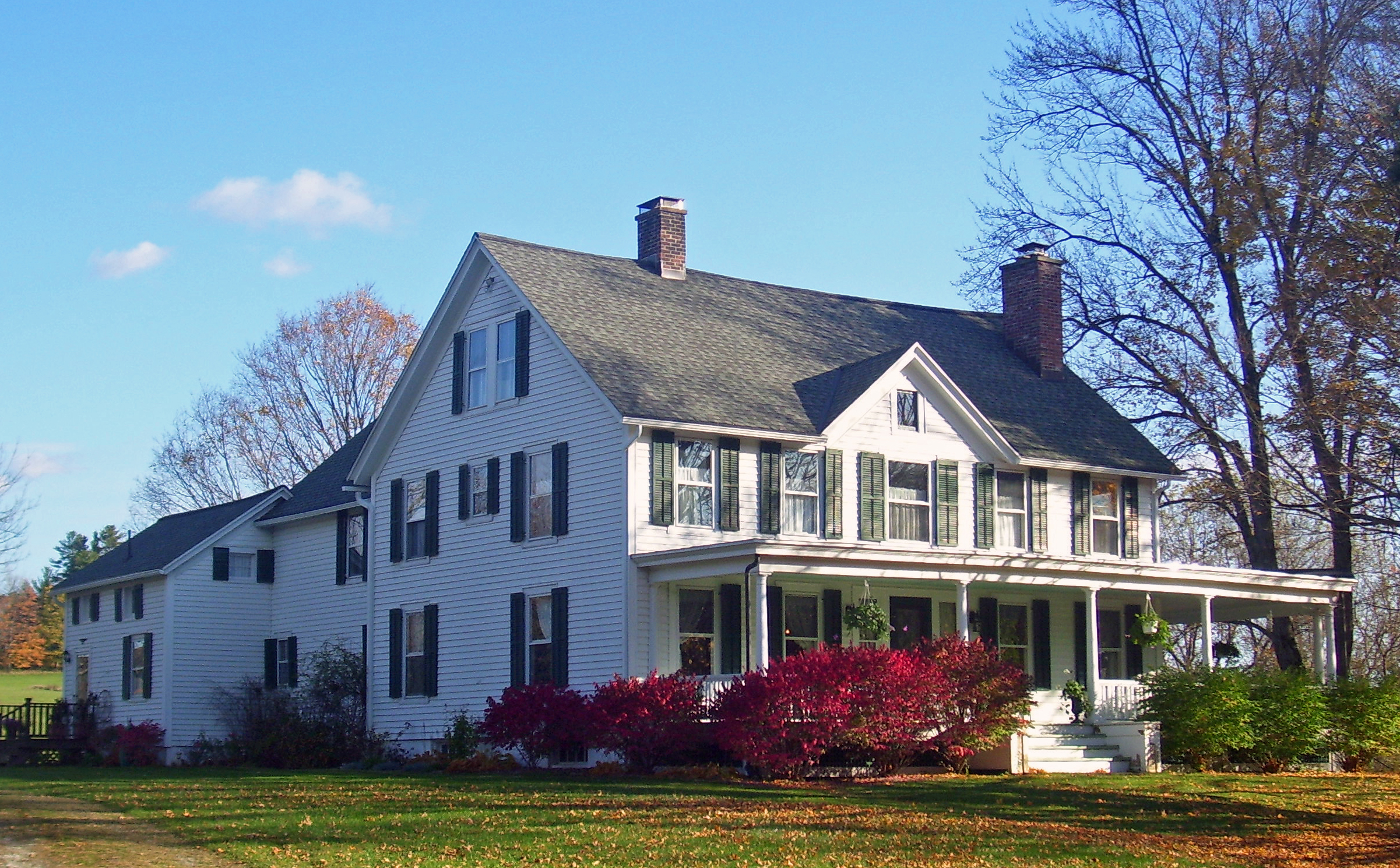
- West elevation and north profile, 2008

- Location within New York Location within the United States
- Location: North East, New York
- Nearest city: Hudson
- Coordinates: 41°54′9″N 73°31′2″W
- Area: 11.8 acres (4.8 ha)
- Built: 1853
- Architectural style: Federal, Queen Anne
- Part of: Coleman Station Historic District
- NRHP reference No.: 00001416

Significant dates
- Added to NRHP: November 22, 2000
- Designated CP: cp

The Oliver Barrett House is located on Reagan Road in the Town of North East, New York, United States, south of the village of Millerton. It is a frame farmhouse built in the mid-19th century, possibly on the site or with materials from another, older house. In the early 20th century it underwent substantial renovations, particularly of its interior. Later in the century it was subdivided into rental units, a conversion reversed by more recent owners.

It combines the Federal and Queen Anne architectural styles. Barrett, a successful farmer who became the first postmaster of the small rural hamlet in the area. It has been a contributing property to the Coleman Station Historic District since that was created in 1991, and was listed on the National Register of Historic Places in its own right in 2000.

== Buildings and grounds ==
The house is north of the three-way intersection of Coleman Station, Reagan and Sheffield Hill roads, just east of the Harlem Valley Rail Trail and a mile (1.6 km) west of the Connecticut state line. It sits near the bottom of the topographical bowl that forms Coleman Station, on an 11.8-acre (4.8 ha) parcel, mostly clear with some mature trees clustered south of the house, on the east side of the road. The surrounding land is gently rolling, with the house on a small rise that drops to a small pond in the rear formed by a tributary of Webutuck Creek.

Opposite the creek the ground rises sharply again to Hiddenhurst, the early 20th-century retirement estate of Thomas Hidden, now itself listed on the National Register as well. To the south, across Sheffield Hill Road, are some former worker housing from the former Sheffield Farm dairy complex nearby. Across Reagan Road, to the northwest of the property, is the Victorian Arthur Peck House, another contributing property to the district. The land to the southwest, across the rail trail, rises sharply into a woodlot.

There are four resources on the property, two buildings and two sites. The house and the sites of an original barn and silo, as well as that of the post office which served Coleman Station for a century, are considered contributing resources to the National Register listing. The garage, built around 1989, is not.

=== Exterior ===
The main block of the house is a two-story, five-bay structure of hand-hewn heavy timber frame on a foundation of concrete and stone. It is sided in weatherboard and topped with an asphalt side-gabled roof with slightly overhanging eave pierced by two brick chimneys. There is a projecting rear wing with extensions.

A wraparound porch with wooden guardrail and a flat roof supported by round wooden columns runs the length of the west and south elevations. A set of wooden steps lead up to the centrally located main entrance. Above it at the roofline is a pediment with a small casement window. All the other windows are double-hung sash with louvered shutters. The three-bay north and south elevations have a double window at the attic level, with the lower story windows slightly offset to the east and a smaller window between the two on the second story. Fenestration on the rear is asymmetrical and irregular.

The kitchen wing, attached at the northeast, is a full two stories. From it another wing of one and a half stories projects further east. Both have identical treatments to the main block. At the east end of the second wing's north elevation there is an entrance with small porch.

=== Interior ===
At the main entrance, an oak paneled door with original beveled glass opens into a wide center hallway, floored in wide oak strips, with a large oak staircase. A paneled door on the north leads to a small parlor, with large double pocket doors leading to a larger parlor and another small single pocket door opening into a large mourning room. In both of these rooms the oak strips on the floor are arranged in a pattern of concentric rectangles. A double pocket door separates them. On the south wall of the parlor is a brick fireplace, built later, with original wooden mantelpiece. The windows have heavy oak trim, raised panels beneath them and a beveled-edge mirror between the two on the west wall.

The room on the north side of the hall has a brick corner fireplace with an oak mantel and beveled mirror above. One of the original cranes remains in the fireplace. Flooring is medium-width oak strip original to the house.

On the south side of the central hall, is another double pocket door leading to the dining room and a small closet built into the paneling below the stairs. All doors on the central hallway have raised panels and brass hardware original to the early 20th century, when they were installed. A door leads from this room to the dining room, in the rear wing.

The main entrance to the dining room is the pair of pocket doors at the east end of the center hall. It has diagonal maple-strip flooring and an oak and glass china cupboard. The south wall has an exterior door of oak paneling with a beveled glass window, flanked by two large windows with raised panels below.

Another door leads into the kitchen wing, which includes a full bathroom and pantry, the latter now used as a laundry room. It is floored in large terra cotta tiles. An original staircase, with rounded pine handrail and square newels and balusters leads upstairs.

The second floor is laid out similarly to the first, on a center hall plan. Its hallway turns toward the rear to access the backstairs to the attic, with risers slightly steeper than those on the other stairs. There is a small kitchenette in the south room. Many doors are original, with one having an original thumb latch. The floor is wideboard pine, most of it original.

In the basement, under the entire house except for the rear extension, the original hand-hewn timber is visible. The beams below the front parlor with the corner fireplace are half-round with bark still attached, and the walls there mortared-over stone instead of the concrete elsewhere in the basement. The heavy board-and-batten doors between the three rooms and their hardware are original. The sub-flooring under the parlor and mourning room runs on a diagonal to support the unusual pattern above it.

== History ==
Although its own origins are murky, the Barrett House's history is intertwined with the development of Coleman Station from a remote farm community in the early days of settlement to a dairy production center today. Its existence and renovation correspond with changes in its community.

=== 1808–1853: Development of Barrett farms ===
The Barrett name's presence in Coleman Station dates formally to 1808, when Caleb Dakin, the son of an early landowner in the area, sold 50 acres (20 ha) to his son-in-law Ezra Barrett. When Ezra died in 1819, his daughter Rhoda inherited more land and an interest in her father's estate. Ezra also bought land from two other farmers in the area, increasing the total landholding to over 150 acres (61 ha) at its greatest extent.

Oliver Barrett, born in 1819, was the youngest of the couple's five children. He grew up and became a successful farmer, eventually becoming one of the largest producers of fluid milk in an area gradually transitioning from diverse animal farming to dairy farming. In the late 1840s the New York and Harlem Railroad, the state's first, was built through the area. A neighbor, John Wheeler, petitioned the Post Office to open a branch in the area, then known as Oblong due to its location in a thus-shaped region at the center of colonial-era land dispute between New York and Connecticut.

In 1853 the post office was designated. Ten months later Barrett was appointed its first postmaster. He served in the position for 14 years, during which he was also a local justice of the peace.

=== 1853–1915: First version of house ===
Barrett married his first wife, Catherine Hornfager, in late 1854, a year after assuming the postmaster's responsibilities. It is believed the house was built sometime before his wedding, though its origins are unclear. Local tax maps do not show a house at the location until 1867, but the house's initial architectural style, combining a basic Federal appearance with some late Greek Revival touches, strongly suggests a construction date prior to the Civil War. It would have been common for a prosperous young farmer to move into a new house with his bride at the time of their wedding, as well.

The house's interior suggests either the expansion or reconstruction of an existing house, possibly after a fire. The first story's corner fireplace, and the stone foundation beneath one of the parlors, may be the remnants of an older, prior structure. It has also been suggested that a smaller house elsewhere was moved to the current site and used as the basis for an expanded house.

A railroad station was built nearby in the late 1860s. It would eventually lead to the area being known as Coleman's Station after Amasa Coleman, the local entrepreneur who lobbied what was by then the New York Central Railroad for a station that could serve the dairy farmers primarily, since the Sharon station several miles to the south was handling both their produce and passenger traffic from wealthy summer vacationers heading to and from New York City and the town of the same name across the state line. In 1872 the Post Office officially changed the name of the local office to Coleman's Station from Oblong.

Oliver Barrett resumed the postmaster's duties with the name change. His wife had died two years earlier, so he remarried. Julia Elizabeth Pulver became his wife in 1874. His son Ezra Lathrop Barrett, known professionally as E. Lathrop Barrett, became the railroad's station agent, a job complementary to his father's. Barrett would remain postmaster until retiring in 1892. He came out of retirement in 1895 and served until his death the following year.

The next year Rhoda Louise Barrett bought out her siblings' share of the estate. They sold a small parcel of land across the street to Arthur Peck, a businessman who owned a tavern in nearby Millerton, by then established as the commercial and civil center of the Town of North East. The deed allowed him to build a house on the property but prohibited him from building another tavern in Coleman Station's small commercial area around the rail depot.

=== 1915–present: Renovations and conversions ===
Rhoda married the following year. Her new husband, Howard Schutt, became postmaster in 1908. He held this job for another ten years. Near the end of that period, in 1915, they embarked on a substantial renovation of the family homestead. Many of their changes were in the last phases of the Victorian styles, particularly the Queen Anne style. The wraparound porch was added to the exterior, and much of the current interior was remodeled in this style at that time.

Starting in the 1920s, the Schutts began to break up the farm. Eventually all but 55 acres (22 ha) was sold to Sheffield Farms, a large corporate farm that had acquired all or most of some of the surrounding family farms. It would, by the middle of the century, become one of New York City's largest suppliers of milk.

After Rhoda's death in 1941, the farm and house were sold to a Meyer Sutter. He in turn sold to William Greenberg in 1947, who sold it to Stanley Duncan, husband of a descendant of another nearby 19th century farmer. At some point afterwards, the house was converted into a three-unit rental property and more land sold until the land reached its present size and was no longer used as a farm. The Post Office closed the Coleman Station post office in 1954, and the only remaining barn and silo from the original farm burned down sometime before 1970. The remains of both are the property's other two contributing resources.

In 1986 the Duncan family sold the house again. The new owners restored it to single-family use. In 1990 they added the mourning room fireplace and a third chimney, and the pond west of the house. There have been no other changes made to the house and property since then.

== See also ==
- National Register of Historic Places listings in Dutchess County, New York
