= Dakin-Coleman Farm =

Historic house in New York, United States

- U.S. National Register of Historic Places
- U.S. Historic district – Contributing property
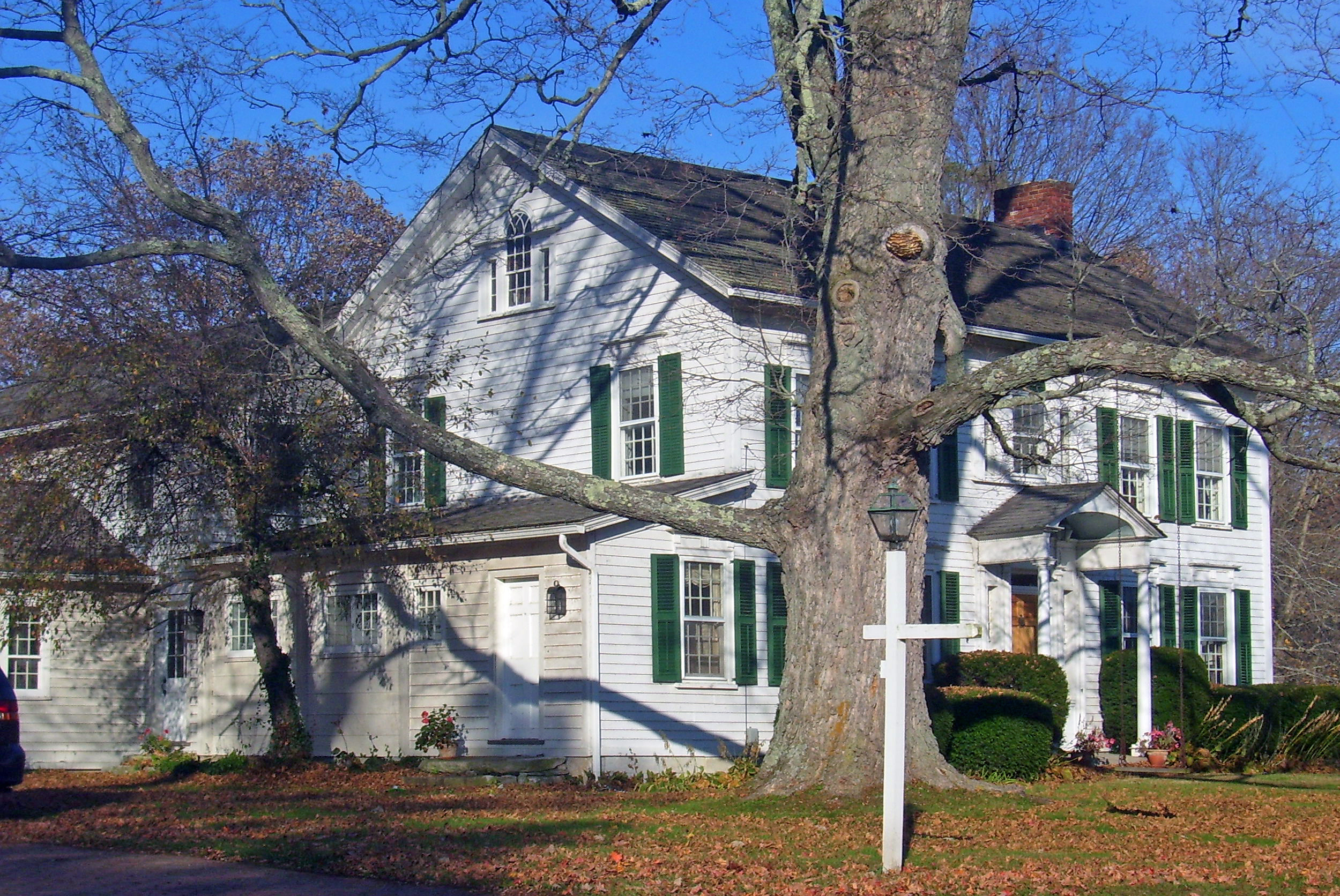
- South elevation and west profile, 2008

- Location within New York Location within the United States
- Location: North East, New York
- Nearest city: Hudson
- Coordinates: 41°54′19″N 73°31′31″W
- Area: 3 acres (1.2 ha)
- Built: 1773
- Part of: Coleman Station Historic District
- NRHP reference No.: 00001421
- Added to NRHP: November 22, 2000

The Dakin-Coleman Farm is located on Coleman Station Road (Dutchess County Route 58) in the Town of North East, New York, United States. Its large wooden farmhouse was built shortly before the Revolution.

At one point it was legally divided between two heirs of its original builder. In the late 19th century renovations mostly to the interior added some Victorian aspects to it. It has remained largely intact since then, and is the oldest house in the hamlet of Coleman Station. It has been a contributing property to the Coleman Station Historic District since it was listed on the National Register of Historic Places on November 22, 1993, and was listed in its own right on November 22, 2000.

== Buildings and grounds ==
The farmhouse sits on a 3-acre (1.2 ha) lot on the north side of the road halfway between the former site of Coleman's Station along the New York Central Railroad right-of-way (now the Harlem Valley Rail Trail) and the US 44/NY 22 highway. A small tributary of nearby Webutuck Creek flows through the property, and forms its eastern boundary. The land slopes gently toward the west with a sharp rise on the south side. Most neighboring properties are farmland, with typical associated buildings.

There are three buildings on the property: the main farmhouse, a barn and a garage. All were built in different eras. The house and barn are contributing resources to the National Register listing; the one-story frame hipped-roofed garage is more modern and is not.

The main house is a two-story, five-bay hand-hewn timber frame structure on a stone foundation. It is sided in clapboard and topped with an overhanging side-gabled roof shingled in asphalt pierced by a single brick chimney on the east end. Mature trees surround it. A one-story shed-roofed wing projects from the west, with larger wings behind it.

A small gabled porch with round columns shelters the centrally located main entrance. All the windows are flanked by wooden louvered shutters, save for Palladian windows above the main entrance and in the gable fields. Fenestration is symmetrical except for the north (rear) elevation, where it reflects changes made to the interior of the house over the years.

The wooden paneled front door, flanked by sidelights and topped with a transom, opens onto a broad center hallway. An original staircase and doors remain on the west side, while the entryways opposite are open. It is floored in medium width heavy oak shiplap, as are the two western rooms. Their fireplaces share a chimney but are slightly different, as the southwest one is completely original but the northwest one has had new brick put in. It has its original crane and beehive oven.

On the east is a large open drawing room, created by removing the wall that separated the two parlors. Some of the original 12-inch (30.5 cm) flooring planks, with forged-head nails, remain in the corner. A firebrick fireplace with neoclassical mantel is located on the end wall. French doors open to the exterior from the rear. A chair rail runs the length of the wall.

The staircase has original square newels and balusters supporting a simple molded pine handrail. It leads to a second floor with a similar layout. On the east side of the central hall are two large doors, apparently original, with one perhaps taken from the first floor. Two newer bathrooms have been added in the rear, both using the original wide pine floorboards. The southeast room has its original fireplace of cut marble. A doorway connects it to the second story of the kitchen wing, which also has remnants of the original hearth. A full basement extends under the entire house.

== History ==
The land the house stands on was first owned by Simon Dakin, a Baptist minister from Concord, Massachusetts. He bought 107 acres (43 ha) for his son Caleb to start a farm on in 1773. It is believed that Caleb built the house shortly thereafter, making it the oldest extant residence in the Coleman Station area.

Caleb died young. His will divided his holdings, which he had increased during his life to 275 acres (111 ha), into 10–12-acre (4.0–4.9 ha) strips and distributed them among his wife and daughters, under the control of his only son, Caleb Jr. One of these divisions went right down the house's center. It was split between Myra Dakin Goodrich and Achasa Dakin Coleman, with occupancy rights granted to Dakin's widow Rhoda and his unmarried daughter Betsy.

The property was transferred again when Caleb Jr. died a year later. His nephew Amasa Dakin Coleman acquired the property from his mother upon reaching the age of majority in 1834. Sometime during that decade the interior was modified slightly, with the wooden neoclassical mantelpiece added and the flooring replaced in the east parlor.

By 1850 Amasa Coleman had increased the size of the farm to 150 acres (61 ha). An abolitionist, he was one of the first members of the local Republican Party. He strongly supported local improvements such as the New York and Harlem Railroad, going so far as to testify in court on the railroad's behalf when his neighbors the Wheelers contested the compensation it offered them for their nearby farm. He would later lobby for the opening of a station on his property near the farms of the area, all of which were beginning to specialize in raw milk production, and it and the area would eventually take its name from him.

His daughter Elizabeth inherited the farm when he died in 1876. It was less successful under her ownership. Around that time the interior was further reworked with more Victorian touches added, as well as the exterior changes like the French doors.

In 1912, on Elizabeth's death, the house was sold out of the family. The associated land was gradually sold as well, leaving the current three acres. In 1920 the garage was built. The house's interior was reworked again to accommodate changes to the plumbing, including the new bathrooms, in 1992. There have been no other major changes to the property.

== See also ==
- National Register of Historic Places listings in Dutchess County, New York
