= Coleman Station Historic District =

Historic district in New York, United States

- U.S. National Register of Historic Places
- U.S. Historic district
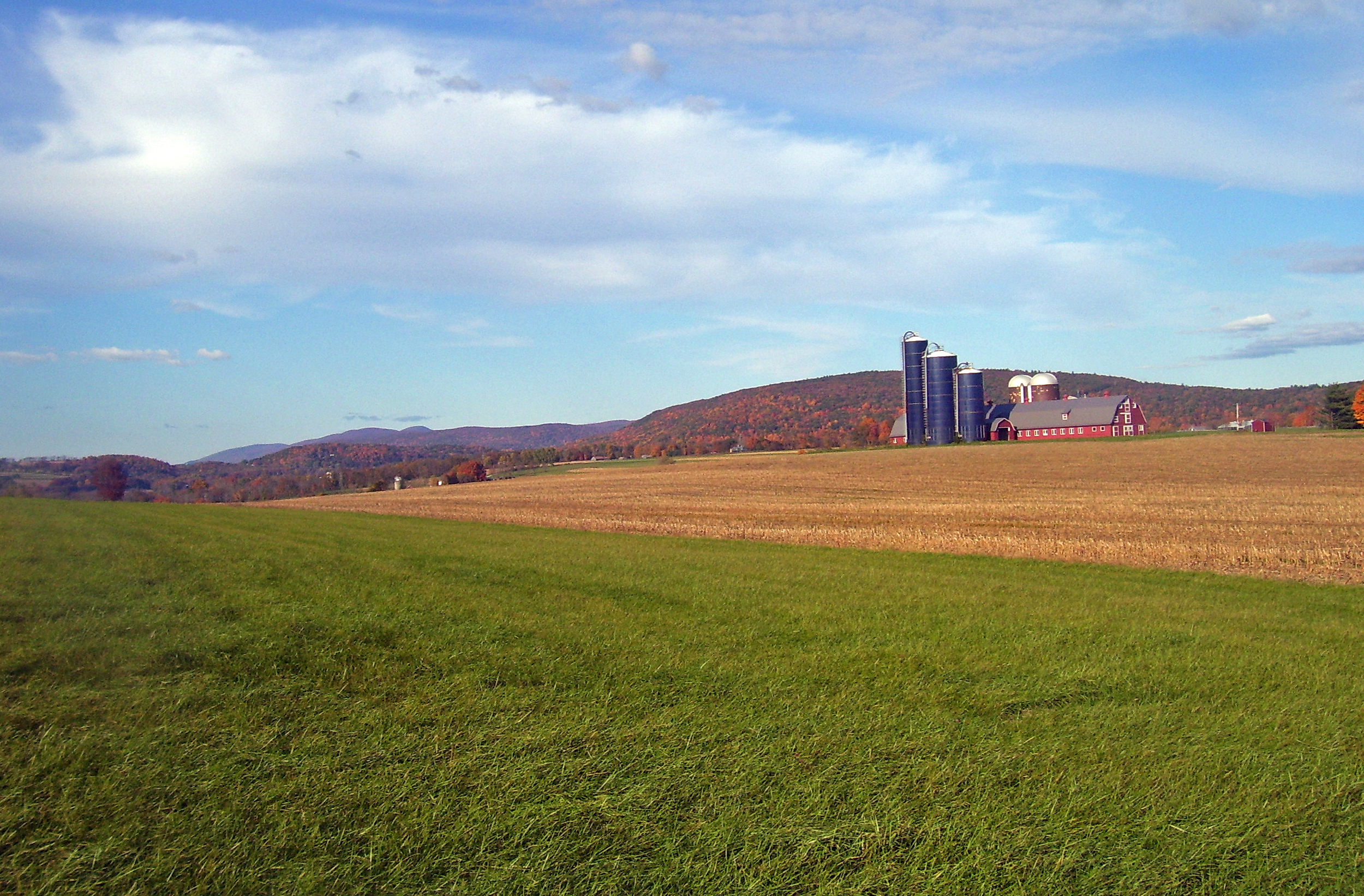
- View north towards Taconic Mountains from Sheffield Hill Road, 2008

- Location within New York
- Location: North East, NY
- Nearest city: Hudson; Torrington
- Coordinates: 41°54′7″N 73°31′6″W
- Area: 1,812 acres (733 ha)
- Built: 1731–1903
- Architectural style: Colonial, Early Republic, various 19th and early 20th century styles
- NRHP reference No.: 93000945
- Added to NRHP: September 30, 1993

The Coleman Station Historic District is located around the former New York Central Railroad Coleman's station in the Town of North East, New York, United States, a short distance south of the village of Millerton. It is a rural area including several large farms in the southeastern corner of the town. At almost three square miles (7.33 km^{2}), it is the largest historic district entirely within Dutchess County and the second largest in the county.

Nine farms were established in the current district by emigrants from New England in the late 18th century. Those farms have since been subdivided and recombined under later owners, but their original boundaries were used to establish the district, a small valley along Webutuck Creek. Over the course of the 19th century they evolved from farms that primarily raised a diverse group of livestock for local and regional markets to dairy farms that used the station and the railroad line that ran through the middle of the district to sell raw milk to New York City. By the middle of the 20th century, a corporate farm in the district had become one of the city's largest milk providers.

At the end of the 19th century, residents of the city began to make country retreats in and around the district. A century later some of them lobbied to create the district and list it on the National Register of Historic Places in 1993. One local farm's resistance to that effort went as far as federal appeals court after lower state and federal courts had negated the creation of the district. Since then some newer farms in the district have used its historic buildings and farms for coffee roasting and low-impact sheep farming, among other.

Many of the buildings in the district were erected in the 18th and 19th centuries, with little modification since then. They reflect, in many instances, different phases of agricultural development in the district. Five of these contributing properties are listed on the National Register of Historic Places.

== Geography ==
The district is an irregularly shaped area whose boundaries follow either lot lines or the roads in the area. It is bisected by the former railroad right-of-way, now a portion of the Harlem Valley Rail Trail. The US 44/NY 22 highway is its westernmost extent, with a stretch of a half-mile (1 km) in either direction from the Coleman Station Road intersection serving as the southwestern corner line, with the exception of a small newer farm on the east side of the road near the southern end. From there the boundary runs due east to the rail trail, and turns south.

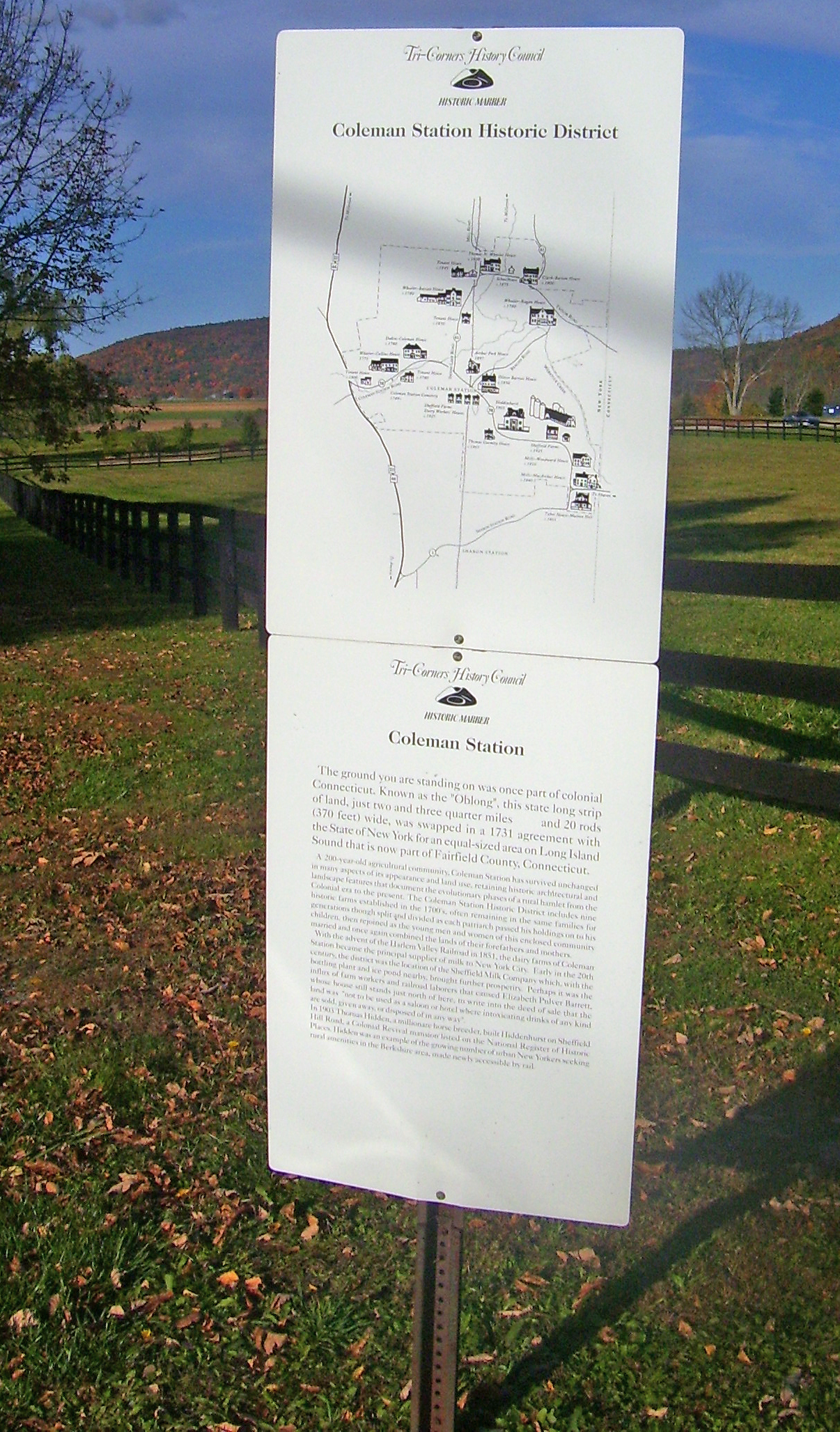
Sign at district boundary

After following the rail trail for a thousand feet (300 m), it turns east again and follows lot lines first between fields and then through a large woodlot to Sheffield Hill Road. It turns south and then east, taking in another farm, and then follows the Connecticut state line, following it north to a dirt road along Webutuck Creek. It then follows the creek itself, excluding a large farm along the state line to the east.

At Taylor Road it follows the road briefly, then a lot line straight east back to the state line. Just at the southwestern corner of Indian Lake, it follows another lot line east, then north, and then east again at the rear lines of modern houses along Red Cedar Lane. It then curves north along Indian Lake Road to another property line which it then follows west, at the district's northernmost corner. The boundary turns to the south along this line after roughly 1,200 feet (370 m), then returns to its due-west heading for another half-mile, crossing the rail trail and Mill Road at their junction. It turns south at a cleared field in the middle of the woods, then follows lot lines back to routes 22 and 44.

Topographically, the 1,812 acres (733 ha) inside this boundary is a bowl through which the creek flows, formed by ridges and plateaus of as high as 900 feet (270 m) in elevation, and breached by valleys of the Webutuck's tributaries in the area, and the Webutuck itself at the north end, near the lake. The station area that gave the district its name lies at the low point, around 580 feet (180 m). Most of the land is used for agricultural purposes, as fields or pasture, with some areas remaining as woodlots. Because of the clearing, it offers scenic views in every direction, particularly of the Taconic Mountains to the north and east.

The nearest settlement to the district is Sharon Valley, Connecticut, one mile to the southeast. Downtown Sharon is just east of Sharon Valley. The nearest New York neighbors are the village of Millerton, four miles (3 km) north, and the hamlet of Amenia three miles (6.4 km) south, along routes 22 and 44.

There are a total of 85 buildings, 23 sites and 9 structures within the district, most of them used for farming. Of these 117 resources, all but 29 are contributing properties to its historic character. Four of the farms and one former estate have been individually listed on the National Register.

== History ==
What would become Coleman Station took a long time for Europeans to settle due to land disputes between the colonies of New York and Connecticut. The current boundary was resolved in 1732. Even after settlement began, the pace was slowed by war. In the early 19th century farming finally developed, moving from a diverse pre-industrial agriculture to a more specialized focus on milk production after the railroad and industrialization.

Farming survived the decline of the railroads in the late 20th century. Newcomers to the region saw its historic value and fought a precedent-setting court battle in the last years of the century to publicly recognize and preserve it. Since then agriculture in the district has once again begun to diversify.

=== 1731–1771: Early settlement ===
Tradition has it that the area, like much of the Harlem Valley in eastern Dutchess County, was thoroughly cleared and cultivated by Native Americans before European settlers arrived. That took later than usual due to the land dispute between the colonies of New York and Connecticut. Few settlers built homes in the 150 square miles (390 km^{2}) borderland known as the Oblong until the 1730s, when the two colonies agreed that the Panhandle, where Greenwich, Stamford and New Canaan are now, would be part of Connecticut while New York got the Oblong.

The agreement allowed for Connecticut landowners to continue to hold title in the Oblong, in order that they would have an incentive to pay for an overdue survey of the land. Even with these issues resolved, and land apportioned, sold and subdivided, there was still little settlement of the area throughout the mid-18th century. Indians, who had found the area a desirable place to settle while its legal status was unclear, established villages in the area, giving Indian Lake its name. Their presence in the area is recorded as late as the 1750s.

Most areas of the Harlem Valley were difficult places to establish farms due to the minimal amount of arable land. The area later to become Coleman Station was an exception. Settlers coming west from New England found its alluvial soil ideal for farming. One family, Nathan Wheeler and his son Elijah, of New Marlborough, Massachusetts, bought over 200 acres (81 ha), the first of two families by that name to establish themselves in the district, in the early 1760s. Another family, the Collinses, had already settled nearby but bought land in the district to give to their children.

The oldest surviving buildings in the district, the farmhouse and barn at the Wheeler-Collins Farm on Coleman Station Road, have been dated to about 1771, shortly after land-transaction records start being kept regularly. Thomas Wheeler of Woodbury, Connecticut, arrived right before the war, the other Wheeler to establish his family there. The other farms were established following independence. By the early 19th century four large farms existed, all linked to Wheelers.

=== 1771–1870: Animal farming ===
As the New England farmers settled in their new home, under their new flag, their agricultural practices changed. In their home states, under British rule, they had primarily grown wheat for export. In Dutchess County, they began raising a mix of livestock and cash crops for local and regional consumption, building farms that reflected this with buildings and spaces dedicated to different species. They supplemented their farm income with the extraction of raw materials for early industrial production like iron, limestone and peat, from nearby hillsides and bogs.

The 1850 census contains the first record of farm production in the district. The farms, about 150–200 acres (61–81 ha) each, averaged 5–6 cows for milking, with twice that number slaughtered for meat. The former produced 300–500 pounds (140–230 kg) of butter and 150–300 pounds (68–136 kg) of cheese. Sheep were more numerous, about a hundred per farm on average, yielding 200–400 pounds (91–181 kg) of wool each year. They were joined by 20–30 pigs, oxen used as beasts of burden and horses for personal transportation. Most improved land on the farms was used as pasture; cropland was used mostly for animal feed, hay and potatoes.

Ten years later, the 1860 census shows a dramatic change in animals raised. Cow herds have gained at the expense of pigs and sheep, and the number of milking cows increased to 10–20, with no change in the crops grown. This reflects the 1852 advent of the New York and Harlem Railroad, the state's first, into the area, and with it a milk-processing plant in Wassaic to the south. Farmers could now get their milk and products to the growing New York City market, making dairy farming much more profitable.

The 1870 census for the first time recorded fluid milk production, with the Coleman Station farmers' herds putting out 10,000–15,000 US gallons (38–57 m^{3}) annually. Farms still produced their own butter in quantity, but left cheese production and its enormous fluid milk requirements to the processing plant. It was the beginning of a shift from the diverse animal farming which had characterized the district earlier in the century to almost exclusively dairy farming, as it is today. Barns grew bigger to accommodate the larger cattle herds and more land was given over to pasture and feed crops.

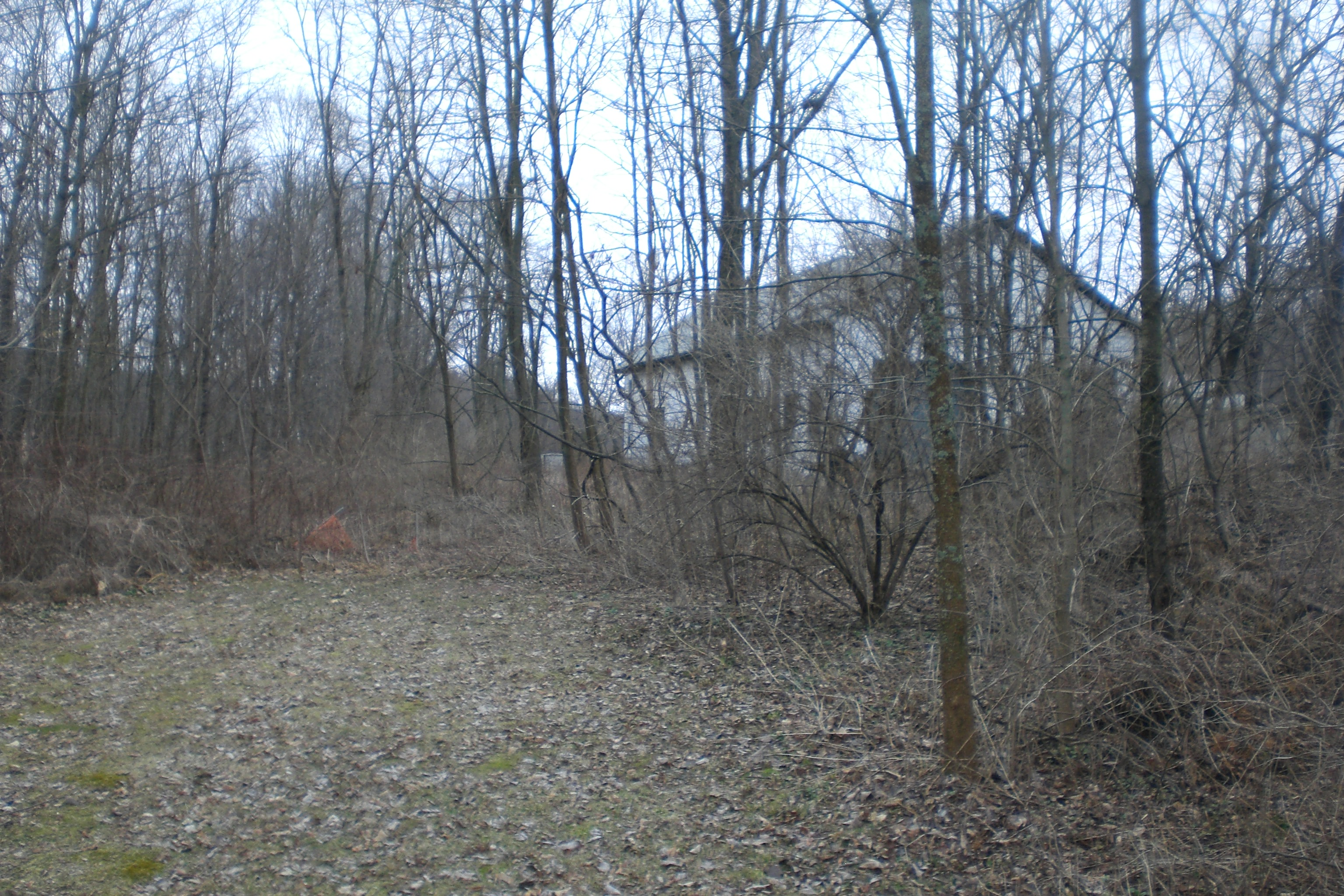
Coleman's Station building today

=== 1850–1923: Conversion to dairy farming and tourism ===
With the coming of the railroad, local entrepreneur Amasa Coleman lobbied for the construction of the station that would take its name from him and give it to the area. He and Oliver Barrett convinced what was by then the New York Central that a separate stop less than two miles (3 km) north of its Sharon station would help it better serve both the vacationers headed for that town across the state line and the farmers. The station spurred the development of a small commercial center around it, almost vanished today. Indian Lake Road was rerouted to the east side of the line (the original roadbed is still visible near the current overpass) and a rock cut created through the Wheeler-Bassett Farm. In the Great Blizzard of 1888 a five-locomotive plowing team was utterly wrecked when it crashed into snow that had accumulated in the cut. Five members of the train crew were killed.

The railroad's presence led to an old farmhouse, today known as Mutton Hill, at the southeast corner of the district, being renovated for use as country house. It was the only one in the district until 1903 when Thomas Hidden, a recently retired New York City industrialist, bought portions of four of the old farms on Sheffield Hill Road to create his Hiddenhurst estate. He may have chosen the Coleman Station area over the more popular Sharon area to the south since he was interested in raising horses on the property. He built a large stable and indoor training course, neither extant. The ornate neo-Georgian main house is considered to be the most architecturally distinctive property in the district.

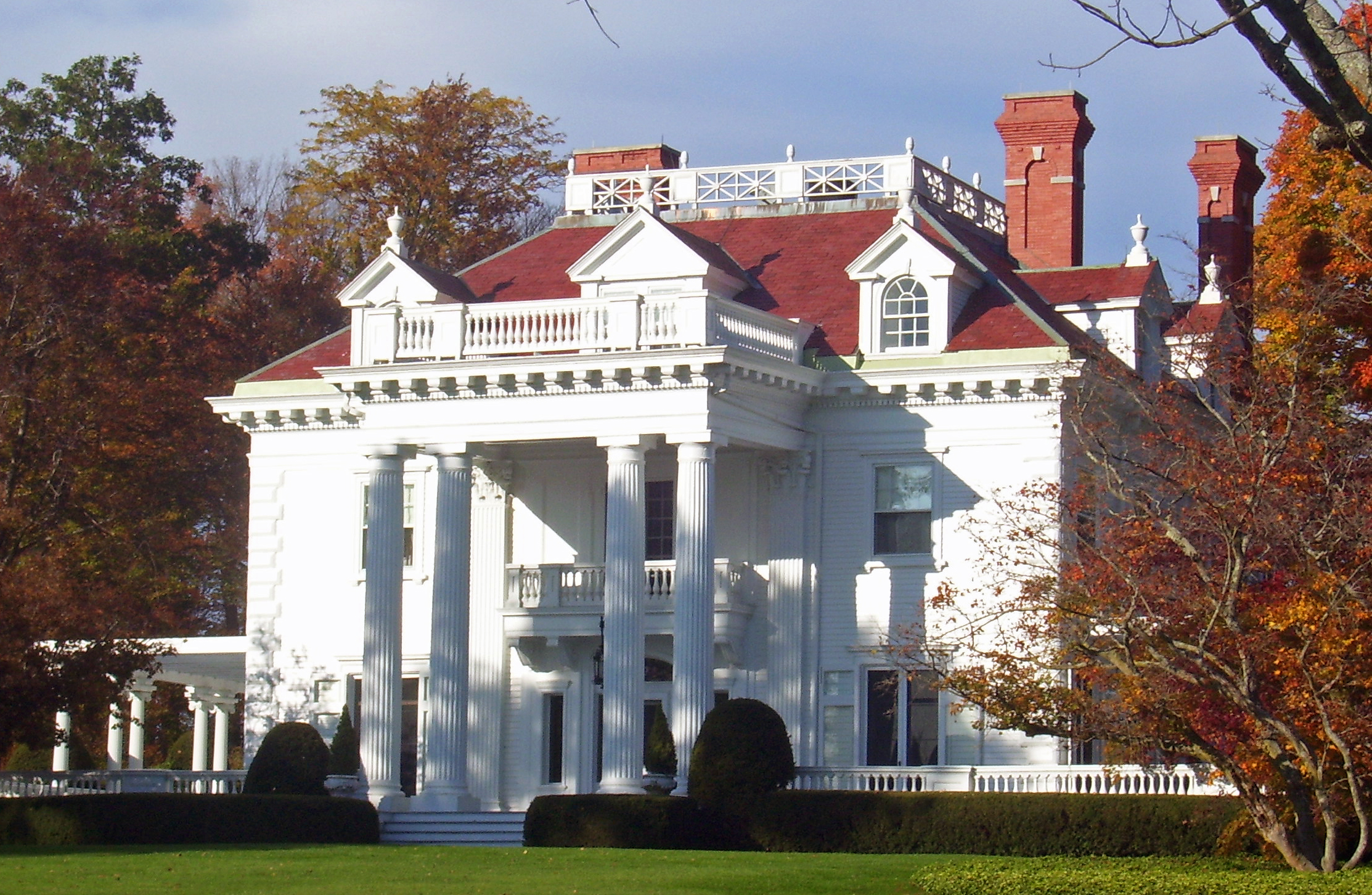
Hiddenhurst

Two years after Hidden's death in 1918, his estate was purchased by the Sheffield Milk Company, which combined his property with others it had acquired nearby and established a large corporate farm. It demolished Hidden's stable and training facility and erected a large dairy complex on its site along with housing for its workers. A new owner of the Wheeler Farm on Taylor Road around this time renovated its house to attract summer boarders, and distributed a brochure promoting it through the railroad. They may not have been the only ones. The transition of the district from an insular farming community, where agriculture defined residents socially as well as economically, to one in which it was purely a business was now complete.

=== 1923–2000: Preservation and litigation ===
Change would continue. In the 1950s Sheffield, now one of the largest milk suppliers to New York City, was bought out by the Sealtest conglomerate. Two decades later the railroad, by now the nearly bankrupt Penn Central, ended passenger service along the railroad north of Dover Plains. Freight service continued for another decade, after which the tracks were removed. In 1985 the Ezra Clark House became the first property in Coleman Station to be listed on the National Register. The owners of Hiddenhurst demolished a remaining brick house and carriage house from one of the original farms a few years later, prior to that property's 1991 listing.

Around that time owners of weekend homes and other residents of the area began working for the creation of a historic district around Coleman Station, forming the advocacy group Friends of Coleman Station. Many of them were also concerned about the large-scale composting activities of McEnroe Farms, one of the largest organic farms in the state, which they felt threatened the watershed with potentially toxic runoff from its manure piles and which fouled the air with strong odors. The farm owners and operator feared that historic designation would bring with it local zoning regulations that would limit their activities to an extent that the farm would become less profitable.

After the listing on the New York State Register of Historic Places in 1993, the Keeper of the Register at the National Park Service followed with a listing on the National Register two months later. McEnroe successfully petitioned a state court to have the district's creation overturned on the grounds that it was not of sufficient historic importance and that notice of the state designation had been neither timely nor accompanied with written support as required by regulations of the state's Historic Preservation Office.

The farm also persuaded Judge Robert W. Sweet of the Southern District of New York to void the federal listing as well, alleging violation of the Administrative Procedure Act. A year later, a three-judge panel of the Second Circuit Court of Appeals reversed Sweet. Judge John M. Walker, Jr. wrote for a three-judge panel that both the National Historic Preservation Act and a similar Hawaii case from 1979 gave the Keeper of the Register the authority to act on a listing independently of a state or local body regardless of whether procedural flaws existed in the state process. Nor were McEnroe's due process rights violated since the National Register listing's only direct effect is to constrain the actions of federal agencies that might affect the listed property.

=== 2000-present: Revitalization ===
After the creation of the district, Sealtest itself became a brand name of the Canadian conglomerate Agropur. A new agricultural product was added to the district in 1999, when the owners of the Manhattan coffeehouse 71 Irving Place opened a roasting facility in a former carriage house on Reagan Road. They cited the area's preserved historic character as a major reason for locating there. Since then what is now known as the Irving Farm Coffee Company has expanded both at its original site and to other locations near Millerton. A mother-daughter team has also brought sheep farming back to the district at Dashing Star Farm, the renamed Stephen Wheeler Farm.

In the 21st century, the railroad corridor came into use again when the Harlem Valley Rail Trail was created. Metro-North Railroad restored Harlem Line passenger service to a new Wassaic station, at the rail trail's southern end. It continues through the district to the old Millerton station. The former Coleman's station site is now used as parking for the bicyclists and walkers who use the trail.

Friends of Coleman Station continues to be active in preserving and promoting the district. It works out of a small headquarters on Indian Lake Road with research materials that is open to the public by appointment. It maintains the small Coleman Station Burying Ground and the Diana K. Temple Memorial Garden along the rail trail, with native plants, trees and shrubs. Every year it hosts an annual cleanup of the district, with the occasional house and district tour.

== Significant contributing properties ==
Five properties within the district, all farms or former farms, are listed on the Register in their own right. Some other properties not yet judged historically significant to warrant listings of their own are significant enough to merit special mention within the district.

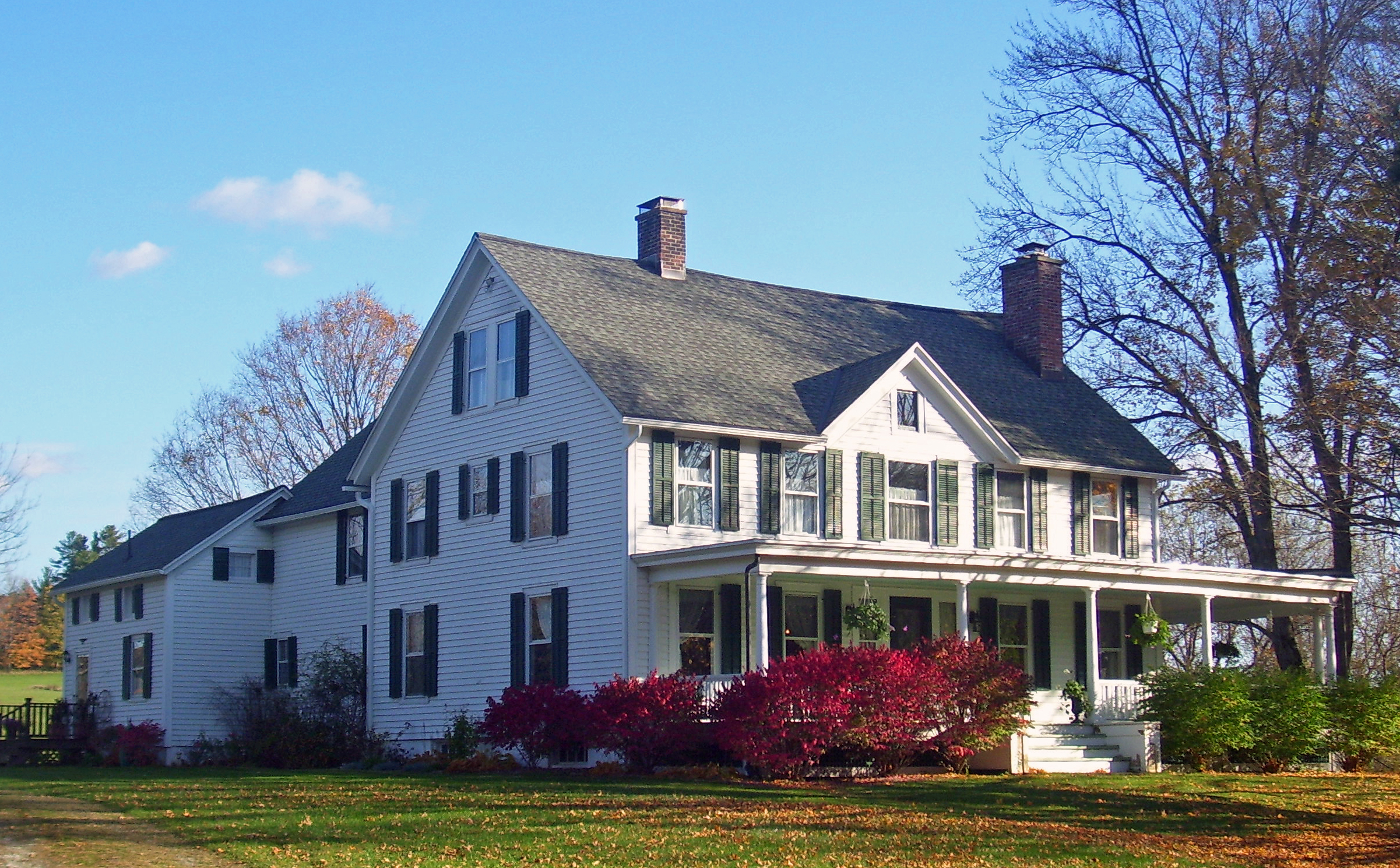
Oliver Barrett House

=== National Register properties ===
- Oliver Barrett House, Regan and Sheffield Hill roads. Probably built in 1853, perhaps with material from an older house, this frame house near the former station site was remodeled in a late Victorian style, particularly inside, in 1915. It i
- Ezra Clark House, Mill Road. The only brick farmhouse in the district follows New England building traditions despite the local Dutch influence suggested by the material.
- Dakin-Coleman Farm, Coleman Station Road. This early 19th century farmhouse at one point divided down the middle and shared by two generations.
- Hiddenhurst, Sheffield Hill Road. Retired paint mogul Thomas Hidden built this ornate neo-Georgian house for his retirement. It is considered the most architecturally distinctive building in the district.
- Thomas N. Wheeler Farm, Indian Lake and Taylor roads. Another original 19th century farmhouse, this was later remodeled into more of a village house due to its proximity to the station.

=== Other properties ===
- Coleman Station Burying Ground, also Oblong Rural Cemetery, Coleman Station Road. Most early residents of the area were buried here. There are approximately 144 stones with the oldest one dating to 1749.
- Coleman Station site. Southeast corner of Coleman Station Road and Harlem Valley Rail Trail. Now used as parking for rail-trail users.
- Mutton Hill, Sharon Station Road. In 1865 this former farmhouse became the first country house in the future district.
- Old Indian Lake Road, along east side of rail trail between Coleman Station Road and present junction of Indian Lake and Taylor roads. The remaining roadbed of the original route prior to the construction of the railroad.
- Wheeler-Collins Farm, Coleman Station Road. Among the ten contributing resources here is the 1771 English barn that is the district's oldest building.

== See also ==
- National Register of Historic Places listings in Dutchess County, New York
