= Ezra Clark House =

Historic house in New York, United States

- U.S. National Register of Historic Places
- U.S. Historic district – Contributing property
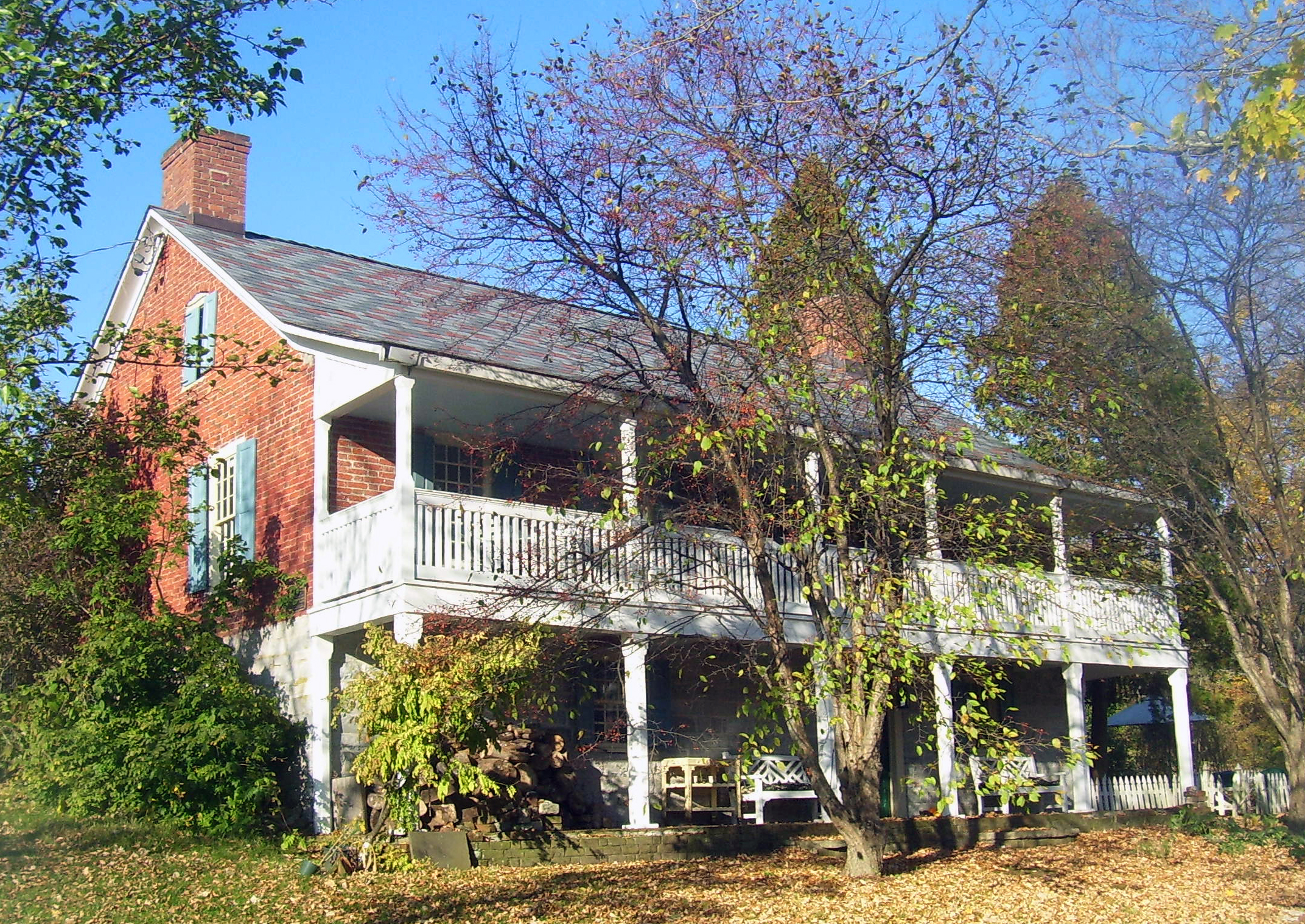
- South elevation and east profile, 2008

- Location within New York Location within the United States
- Location: North East, NY
- Nearest city: Hudson
- Coordinates: 41°55′14″N 73°31′4″W
- Area: 8.7 acres (3.5 ha)
- Built: ca. 1780
- Part of: Coleman Station Historic District
- NRHP reference No.: 85000338

Significant dates
- Added to NRHP: February 21, 1985
- Designated CP: cp

The Ezra Clark House is located on Mill Road in the Town of North East, New York, United States. It is a brick house built in the late 18th century.

It is one of the oldest farmhouses in the town, and one of the few built of brick. In 1985 it was listed on the National Register of Historic Places. Eight years later, when the Coleman Station Historic District was created and listed on the Register, it was further recognized as a contributing property.

== Building and grounds ==
The house is located on a 8.7-acre (3.5 ha) lot behind a picket fence on the west side of Mill Road a short distance north of Indian Lake Road at the center of Coleman Station. To its east the rear lot line is the former New York Central Railroad right-of-way, now the Harlem Valley Rail Trail. It is mostly open fields or wetlands, with a small pond south of the house. In addition to the house there is a barn and shed north of the house and a gazebo at the pond. None are considered contributing resources to the property's historic character. The foundation of an old barn to the northeast has not been assessed for its archaeological potential.

The main house is oriented perpendicular to the road, with its main facade facing south. A stone basement built into a slight rise in the land is exposed on the south and west. It supports a two-story, five-bay brick building with gabled roof shingled in polychrome slate pierced by two brick chimneys. The south (front) elevation has a full-width wooden porch supported by chamfered columns on both stories. The slope of the land means that the rear of the first story is underground.

All windows have paneled wooden shutters with their original hardware. Those on the second story of the front are regularly spaced, those on the ground floor are not. The two that flank the slightly off-center entrance have brick segmental arches.

The windows on the side elevations are asymmetrically placed. The upper rear elevation has a central door with a segmental arched brick lintel. To the east is a larger window with a flat brick arch, added later. The other two windows, on the west, are brick arched and original to the house.

From the main entrance, a modern door with simple wood trim, there is a central hall with two rooms on either side. The rooms on the west feature corner fireplaces; the one in front has an exposed beam ceiling. The front room on the east, the original kitchen, has a large fireplace in the side wall and a Dutch beehive oven; like the two opposite the fireplace's mantelpiece is original. The room to the rear has been divided so as to accommodate a modern bathroom on the east. A staircase on the interior side wall of the old kitchen leads upstairs to bedrooms and a modern kitchen. The garret above it has been subdivided into two bedrooms.

== History ==
For a long time it was assumed that Clark had built the house, and that it was the oldest house in the Millerton area. A brick in the chimney inscribed "J.M. 1780" has suggested it was built later than originally believed, and by someone else. The most likely candidate for "J.M." is Jacob Meyers, a lieutenant in the Continental Army whose family is known to have moved to the Millerton area around that time from the hamlet of Pulvers Corners, today in the town of Pine Plains to the west. The house is a typical Hudson Valley brick house showing the influence of English and Dutch building traditions, such as the porch and central hall plan.

Clark and his family, longtime residents of the area, moved in sometime around 1795. The farm originally included much more land than it presently does. Later owners have added the windows, changed the roofing material several times, and added some of the windows. As a whole the house retains much of its original plan, materials and integrity.

== See also ==
- National Register of Historic Places listings in Dutchess County, New York
