= Thomas N. Wheeler Farm =

Historic house in New York, United States

- U.S. National Register of Historic Places
- U.S. Historic district – Contributing property
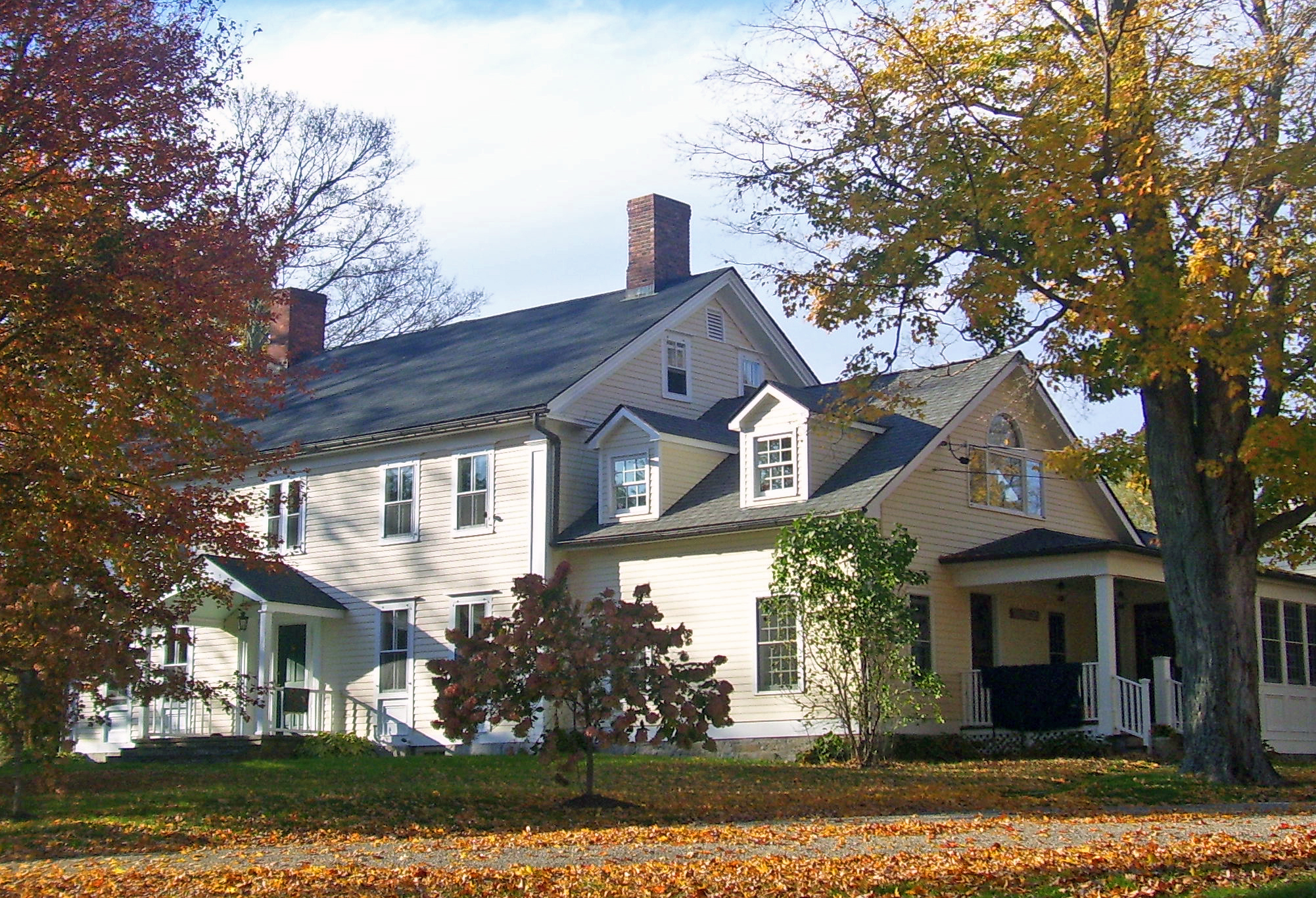
- South elevation and east profile of main house, 2008
- Location: North East, New York
- Nearest city: Hudson
- Coordinates: 41°54′54″N 73°30′56″W
- Area: 18 acres (7.3 ha)
- Built: ca. 1800
- Architectural style: Federal
- Part of: Coleman Station Historic District
- NRHP reference No.: 00001417
- Added to NRHP: November 22, 2000

The Thomas N. Wheeler Farm is located on Indian Lake Road (Dutchess County Route 61) in the town of North East, New York, United States, south of the village of Millerton. It is a frame house built at the beginning of the 19th century in the Federal style.

It is one of the earliest surviving intact farmsteads in the Coleman Station Historic District. In 1993, when the district was listed on the National Register of Historic Places, the house and another building on the property were recognized as contributing properties to its historic character. Seven years later it was listed on the Register in its own right.

== Buildings and grounds ==
The farm's 18 acres (7.3 ha) are located on both sides of Indian Lake Road, just west of the three-way intersection where it turns to the east and Mill Road continues north, just west of the former New York Central Railroad right-of-way that is now the Harlem Valley Rail Trail. The area is level, save for a small rise on the northern lot line, located near the floor of the small bowl that makes up the Coleman Station area. A small tributary of Webutuck Creek flows through the north end of the property, draining into the creek itself a short distance to the east.

North of the road is the house and most of the associated farm buildings are located on the north side of the road. On the south a tennis court stands on what was once a cornfield. Various farm buildings such as a granary, stables and carriage house are located behind the main house. There are six contributing resources to the Register listing on the property.

The main block of the house is a two-story, five-bay hand-hewn timber frame building on a stone foundation. It is sided in clapboard and topped with a gabled roof shingled in wood and pierced by two brick chimneys. It has a one-and-a-half-story wing on the east, similarly treated but with two large gabled dormer windows piercing the roof instead of chimneys. Connected to its northeast is a one-story shed-roofed kitchen wing.

A gable-roofed single-bay porch with railings and square pillars shelters the main entrance. The first-story windows on the south (front) facade have panels beneath. All windows on that facade of the main block are two-over-two double-hung sash. On the wing they are 12-over-12. The kitchen wing's roof shelters a side entrance and porch on the east end of that wing. Above it is a small Palladian window in the gable field. The north (rear) facade has irregularly placed nine-over-six sash.

The raised-panel oak main entrance door, with windows on the side and above, opens onto a wide central hallway with its original heavy oak wide tongue-and-groove flooring and plaster walls. On the east are two parlors of roughly the same size with some original wall sections and wideboard pine flooring. Their fireplaces are almost identical, with pine mantels and marble hearths; the southeast one having a built-in cupboard nearby. The substantial chimney stacks are angled to be centered at the roof. The kitchen wing's interiors date to the early-to-mid-20th century.

On the east of the main hall is the stairs, much of which are original. It has square newels and a simple molded handrail with simple square balusters. The original pine stair treads were protected by carpeting for many years.

The second story has an identical floor plan. The northeast bedroom has original wainscoting and chair rail. All woodwork in it and the southeast room is original as is the pine wideboard flooring. The basement runs under the entire house, including the kitchen wing. There are no hearths, but the stone and wood bases of the chimney stacks are evident.

== History ==
The Wheeler family came to America in 1635 when Thomas Wheeler emigrated from the English town of Cranefield to Concord, Massachusetts. Over a century later, in 1749, his great-great-grandson, also named Thomas, bought land in the Great Nine Partners Patent and settled in what is now Amenia, New York, to the west of the future Coleman Station. He operated a mill near the current house site.

No construction date is known, but it is believed that the house was built around 1800 from its Federal style architecture. At that time Thomas Newcomb Wheeler, one of ten children of the elder Thomas Wheeler's son Noah, would have been 26 years old, old enough to have had his own house. Noah divided his holdings among his children in 1818, retaining what is now the Wheeler-Bassett Farm on Reagan Road for himself to live out his final years.

A tenant house was built to the southwest in the early 1820s. Noah Wheeler's children, Thomas included, bought out their cousins' holdings in 1824. Seventeen years later, in 1841, Thomas sold his holdings to his sons Henry and Lawrence for $9,000 ($281,000 in contemporary dollars), on the condition that he be allowed to remain in his home for the remainder of his natural life and that their 44-year-old unmarried sister Selina be allowed to use one of the bedrooms and both parlors for the remainder of her life. The following year his will expanded on these terms.

Two years later, Thomas N. Wheeler died. Lawrence bought out Henry's interest for $1,200 and then sold it to their younger brother Stephen D. Wheeler for $4,000 ($125,000 in contemporary dollars). The two brothers soon became embroiled in litigation with the New York and Harlem Railroad over the value of the land it wanted to take from them through eminent domain to complete its route from New York City to Albany. The railroad ultimately prevailed, with the Wheelers receiving less per acre than their neighbors, but won the right to have a bridge erected over the rock cut south of the tenant house and maintained in perpetuity by the railroad and its assigns.

Stephen Wheeler moved back into the house after swapping land with his brother in 1859. This transfer reduced the lot around the house to its current 18 acres (7.3 ha) from what had at one time been 600 acres (240 ha). When he died, his daughter sold her rights to the house to her brother Burnett. They mortgaged it in 1876 to Hiram Clark and his wife Mary.

After the Blizzard of 1888, the rock cut filled up with snow, leading to a rail accident that killed five people and took a week to clear. One of the locomotive's cab roofs was used as an animal shelter in a nearby field. The houses were used to treat the wounded. Mary Wheeler defaulted on the mortgage and lost the house in 1897, taking it out of the Wheeler family after almost a century.

== See also ==
- National Register of Historic Places listings in Dutchess County, New York
