= Hiddenhurst =

Historic house in New York, United States

- U.S. National Register of Historic Places
- U.S. Historic district – Contributing property
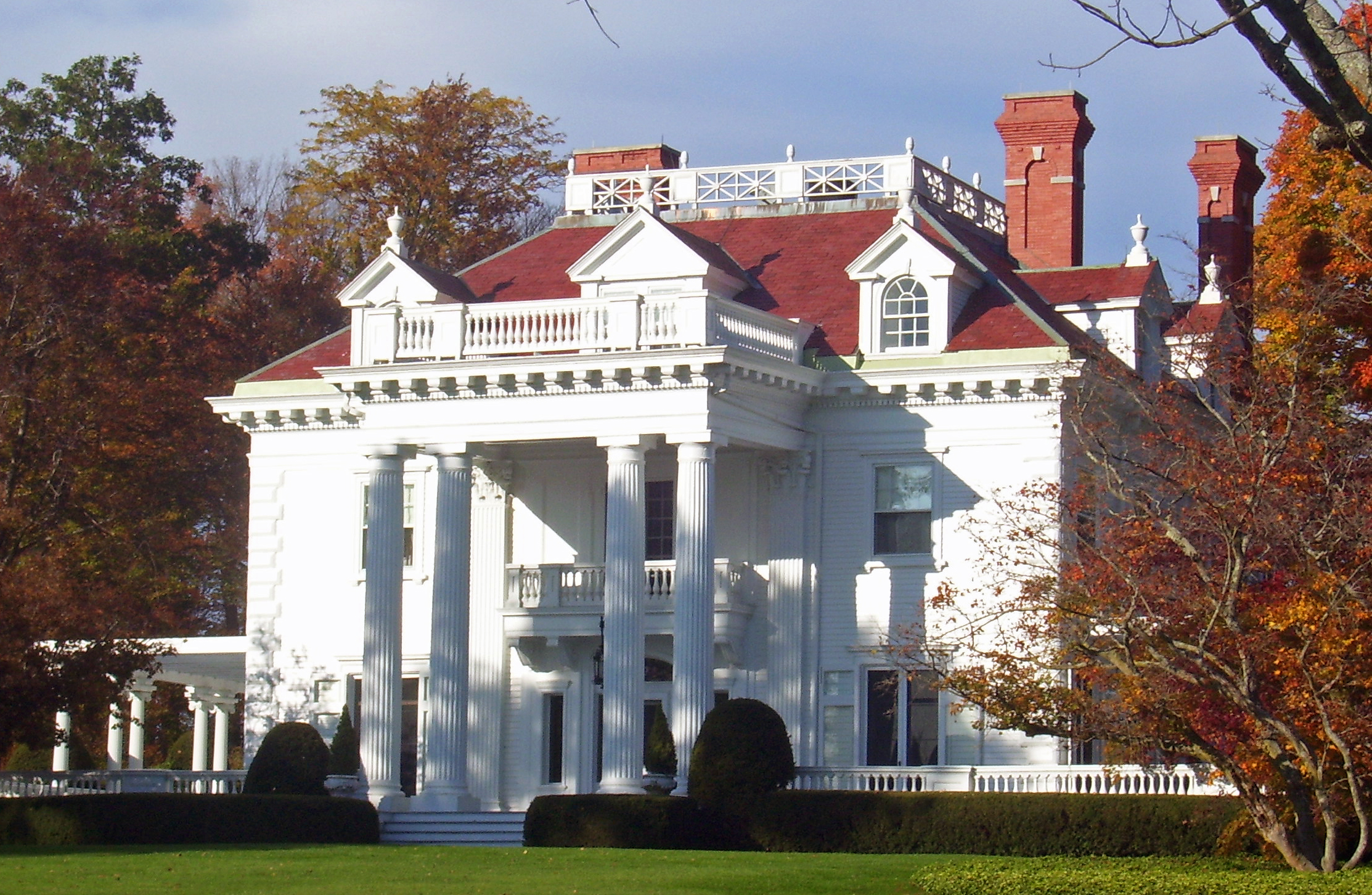
- South elevation and east profile, 2008

- Location within New York Location within the United States
- Interactive map showing the location of Hiddenhurst
- Location: North East, NY
- Nearest city: Millerton
- Coordinates: 41°53′49″N 73°30′37″W
- Area: 44 acres (18 ha)
- Built: 1903
- Architectural style: Neo-Georgian
- Part of: Coleman Station Historic District
- NRHP reference No.: 93000945
- Added to NRHP: February 21, 1991

Hiddenhurst is the former estate of businessman Thomas Hidden, on Sheffield Hill Road in the Town of North East, New York, United States, south of the village of Millerton. It is an elaborate frame house built at the beginning of the 20th century in the neo-Georgian architectural style.

Hidden created the estate from portions of four dairy farms in the area and used it to breed horses. After his death in 1918, most of the property was acquired by another large dairy farm in the area, which demolished most of the horse-related facilities. The house is considered one of the most architecturally significant in eastern Dutchess County. In 1991 the remaining estate property was listed on the National Register of Historic Places. It is also a contributing property to the Coleman Station Historic District created two years later.

== Building ==
Hiddenhurst is a complex of three buildings on a 44-acre (18 ha) lot on the northside of Sheffield Hill, a half-mile (1 km) west of the Connecticut state line. The lot is sheltered by planted woodlands of copper beech and pine, especially on the north and west sides. It is on a high ridge over Webutuck Creek to the west. The other properties in the area are farms, with much open land offering views into the Harlem Valley to the south and the Taconic Mountains to the north.

The main house retains its historic and architectural integrity. To its south is an L-shaped two-story frame hipped-roof clapboard-sided caretakers' house with a gabled wing joined by a breezeway to a garage. At the Northwest corner of the property is a one-story guest house of contemporary shingle design. Neither is considered as contributing to its historic character. To the west is a swimming pool, also non-contributing as it is of more modern construction. A tennis court, pond and a water garden was added on the western side of the property in the 1980s.

=== Exterior ===
The house is a two-story, three-bay clapboard-sided structure with a hipped roof resting on a large plinth block of undressed ashlar masonry. This foundation also supports a wooden veranda that completely surrounds it. It is bounded with a balustrade featured paneled corner columns and balusters with extremely narrow necks compared to their bellies. Trellised entrances supported by paired Corinthian columns break it on the east and west sides.

At the center of the south (front) facade, the balustrade is broken by the large projecting entrance portico. Steps lead up to a deck with paired fluted columns with Tuscan capitals supporting a projecting architrave with a paneled underside. Above it a Corinthian entablature is surmounted by a modillioned block cornice. A balustrade similar to the one on the veranda runs around the portico roof.

On the facade, the columns are complemented by two fluted Corinthian pilasters. Between them is the main entrance, a leaded half-glass door with quarter pilasters and sidelights topped by an elliptical transom above a small cornice of ogee and drillwork molding with a volute keystone. The stained glass in the transom is supported by Adamesque cames with haunched panels above. Atop this whole entrance is a balcony with a balustrade similar to the others. A double door framed by a similar treatment to the main entrance below gives access.

French doors in the other two bays round out the fenestration on the first story, with eight-over-one double-hung sash windows above in projecting moldings. Quoins interrupt the clapboard at the corners, with the whole facade topped by a frieze with egg-and-dart and dentil molding running continuously around the house, as does the modillioned block cornice at the roofline. The roof, topped by a balustrade of stick balusters and topped finial posts, is pierced by three brick chimneys and three gabled dormer windows.

The chimneys are intricately decorated. They rise as blind arches with stone imposts and keystones to a seven-course corbel projects in and out. Above it the brick is recessed into a narrow panel, and a narrow capstone tops the chimney. The dormers have round-arched windows topped with keystones.

The east and west facades are almost identical, with similar treatments to the south. They have the same quoins, frieze and cornice surrounding their three bays, with just two gabled dormers piercing the roof. On the east side the bay corresponding to the service room of the house has slightly different, smaller casement windows instead of a French door. The north (rear) face of the house is similar to the south but with more restrained decoration. A one-story pantry wing projects, with paneled pilasters at its corners.

=== Interior ===
Inside the house follows a double pile central hall plan. On the first floor the dining room and service area are on the east with the drawing room and parlor on the west. All are decorated in different styles.

Tuscan columns and pilasters divide the hallway into a vestibule, central circulation and stair area. A common cornice with bead and reel molded cornice set off by a simple chair rail and dado paneling unites all areas. Decoration continues above the cornice with cyma recta moldings in egg-and-dart and Greek fret and foliated patterns below carved modillions on the cornice. Above the cornice is a triple fascia. The rooms are entered through portals with sliding doors. Each is surrounded by a shouldered architrave and topped with a projecting molded cornice surrounded by foliate consoles.

The living room is done in a vaguely Adamesque style. The room side of the portal echoes in wood the design done in plaster on the hallway side. Plaster paneled sgraffito walls rise to a restrained cornice and coffered ceiling. The drawing room is finished in an extravagant rococo mode with extensive pargeting.

On the east side, the dining room cornice matches that in the hall, while the ceiling pargeting is a series of bands of various foliate motifs. Its fireplace features a double mantelpiece and oversized Ionic columns. The open cantilevered spiral staircase is balustraded with simple turnings contrasting with an intricate foliate carving on the step area of the stringer. It rises to a dome with curved triangular coffers separated by olive branch carvings and a stained glass window in the oculus depicting hollyhock festoons.

Upstairs are the bedrooms. Generally more subdued, they are distinguished by their fireplaces. Each is in a different style, from Classical to Queen Anne. The bathrooms have their original tile, with decorative bands under bull-nosed caps. The third floor, designed as three servants' quarters and three guest rooms, is plain except for an elliptical room done in varnished matchboard. There is an attic and widows walk above.

== History ==
Thomas Hidden, a New York City businessman who had made his fortune in paint manufacture and real estate, assembled all or part of four dairy farms in the Coleman Station area in 1903. He then retired to the 450-acre (180 ha) estate and built the house. He was one of the first wealthy New Yorkers to choose the Millerton area, as opposed to neighboring Sharon, Connecticut, and other towns in that state's Northwest Highlands, as a place for a country home. A horse breeder, he found the area an ideal place for that activity, with convenient nearby rail access to the city via the tracks originally built for the New York and Harlem Railroad.

For the horses, he built a half-mile (1 km) indoor training track and large stable complex. He also continued to produce milk as well. The house, whose architect is unknown, but is considered the most architecturally significant in the Harlem Valley. It epitomizes the earlier stage of the Georgian Revival, with its close adherence to classical models and proportions.

After Hidden's death in 1918, the house was eventually sold to Sheffield Farms, a large corporate farm that would become by the middle of the century one of New York City's largest providers of milk. Shortly before Sheffield became part of Sealtest in the 1950s, the stable and track burned down. The estate, formerly 410 acres, has been subdivided down to the 44 acres (18 ha) on which the house sits today .

It remains a private home. In the early 1970s an old brick farmhouse and carriage house on the estate that Hidden had kept were demolished by the then-owners, and the original Scomozzi capitals on the front portico's entrance columns were replaced with the current Tuscan ones. Other than the changes to the carriage house, those have been the only significant changes to the property.

== See also ==
- National Register of Historic Places listings in Dutchess County, New York
