= Amenia station (New York) =

Amenia
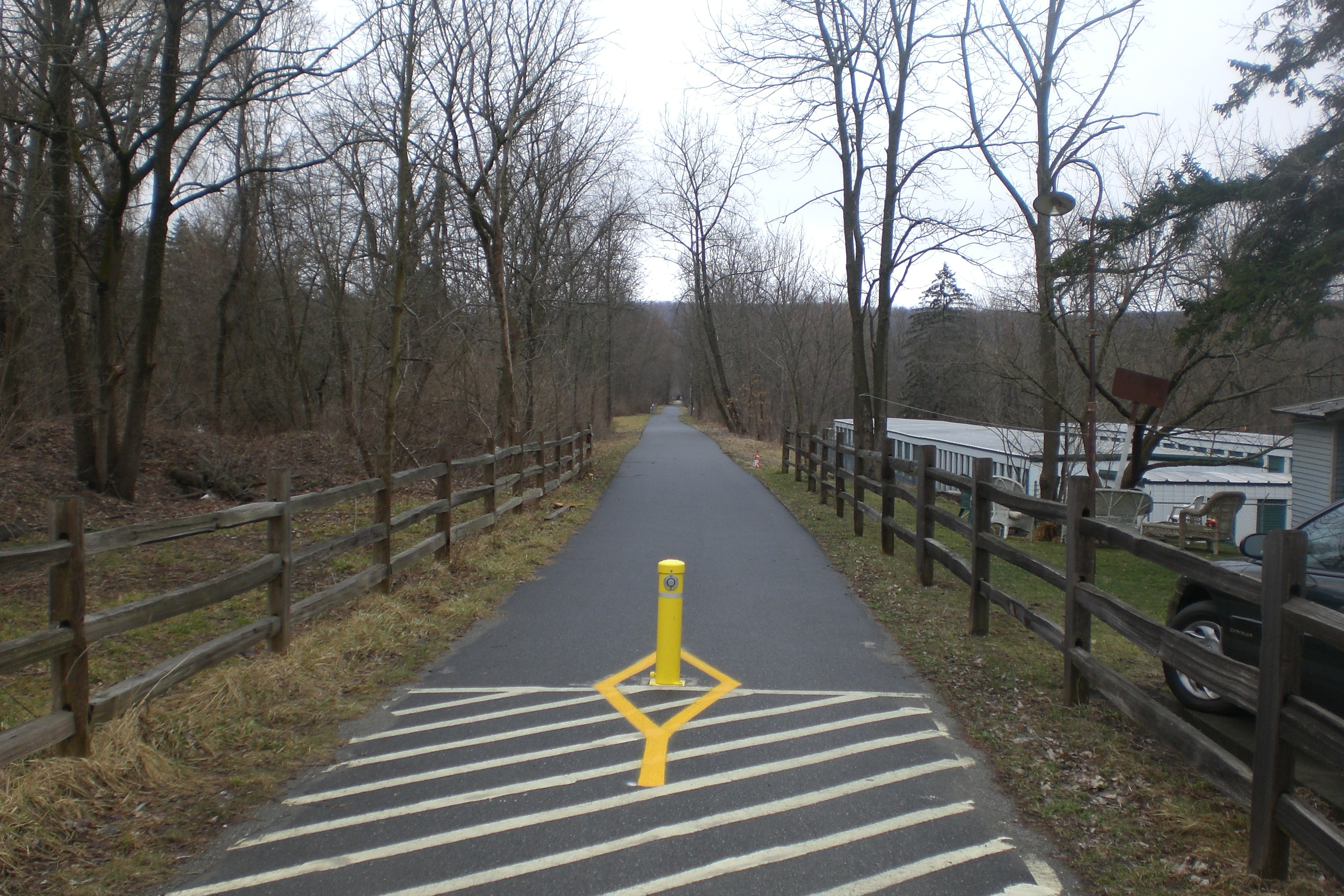
- Amenia station site, c. 2009. A former platform light remains on the right side of the trail.

General information
- Location: 15 Railroad Avenue and Depot Hill Road; Amenia, New York 12501
- Coordinates: 41.8465°N 73.5518°W
- Tracks: 0 (formerly 1)

Construction
- Accessible: No

Other information
- Fare zone: 10

History
- Opened: May 10, 1852
- Closed: March 20, 1972 (passenger service); March 27, 1980 (freight)

Former services
Preceding station	New York Central Railroad	Following station
Wassaic toward New York	Harlem Division	Sharon toward Chatham
Location

The Amenia station was a New York Central Railroad station that served the residents of Amenia, New York via the Harlem Line. It was 85 miles (136 km) from Grand Central Terminal and travel time to Grand Central was approximately two hours, sixteen minutes.

The station consisted of a single low-level platform, on the west side of the single track line. Amenia was the only station on the Harlem Division named for one of the senses as opposed to a name derived from a person or object. Amenia means "pleasant", or pleasing to the eye.

== History ==
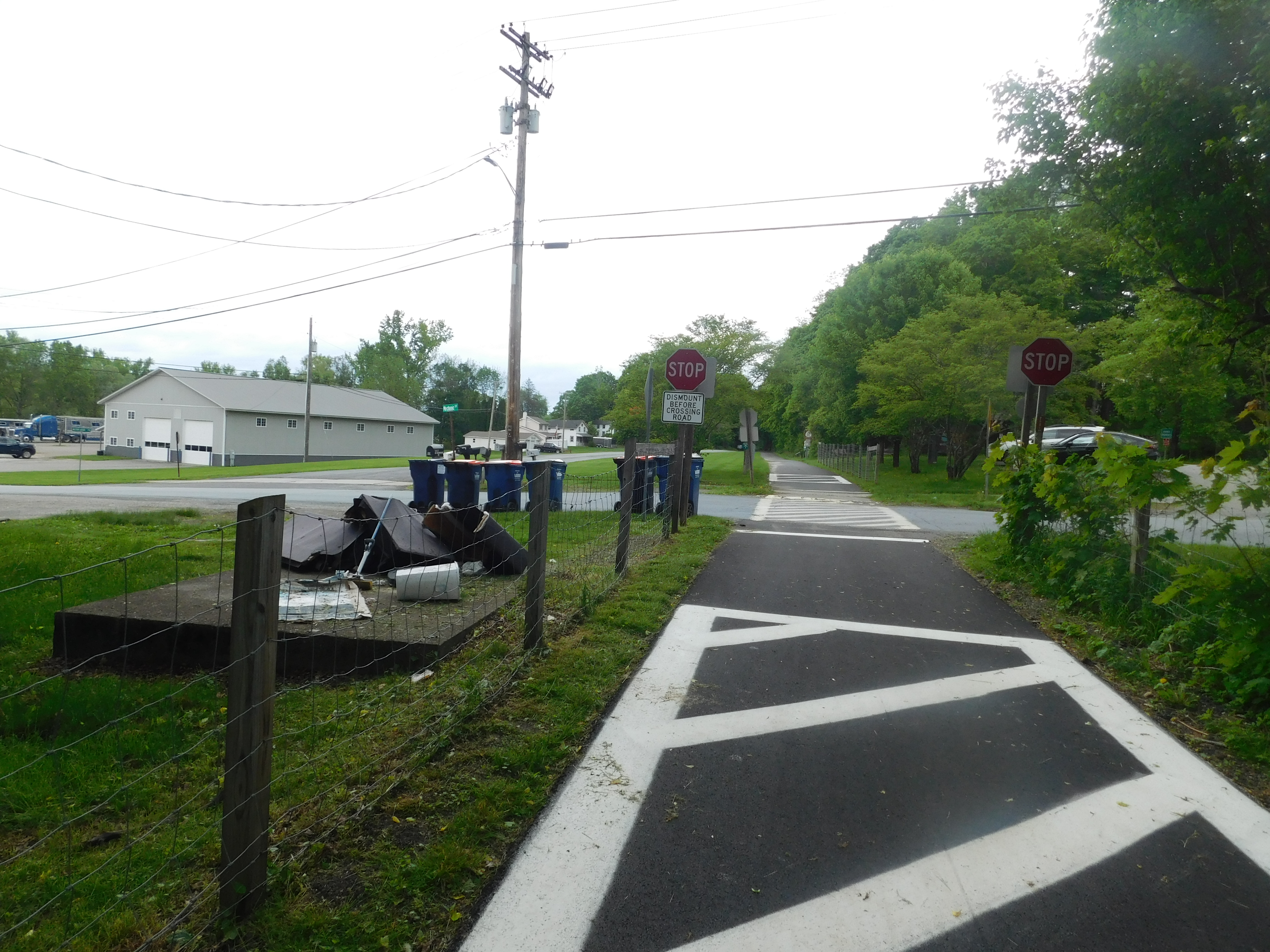
The former station shelter base in Amenia in May 2025

The New York and Harlem Railroad built their main line through Amenia between 1848 and 1852. When the station was built, it contained a freight platform, a telegraph office, Railway Express Agency office, and various spurs used for loading and unloading horse wagons in the 19th century, and later trucks in the 20th century.

Amenia held an annual field day in 1913 and 1914, where Harlem trains brought hundreds of passengers up from Grand Central Terminal. The field day was held at the fairgrounds on North Road Amenia, which played host to many early industries in upper Dutchess County.

Early businesses and industries in the town included a tannery, steelworks, a dairy and milk plant and three important iron mines, all of which utilized the railroad as a means of shipping and receiving goods. All business was located in close proximity to the tracks, making the Harlem Line the common carrier for each. Several large hotels were constructed in town, most notably, the Barton House and the Amenia Inn.

New York Central Railroad merged with Pennsylvania Railroad to form Penn Central Railroad in 1968. Passenger service was eliminated by Penn Central in 1972, and freight service was eliminated by their successor Conrail in 1980. Today, the railroad line is part of the Harlem Valley Rail Trail.
