= Coleman's station =

Former train station in Millerton, New York

Coleman's
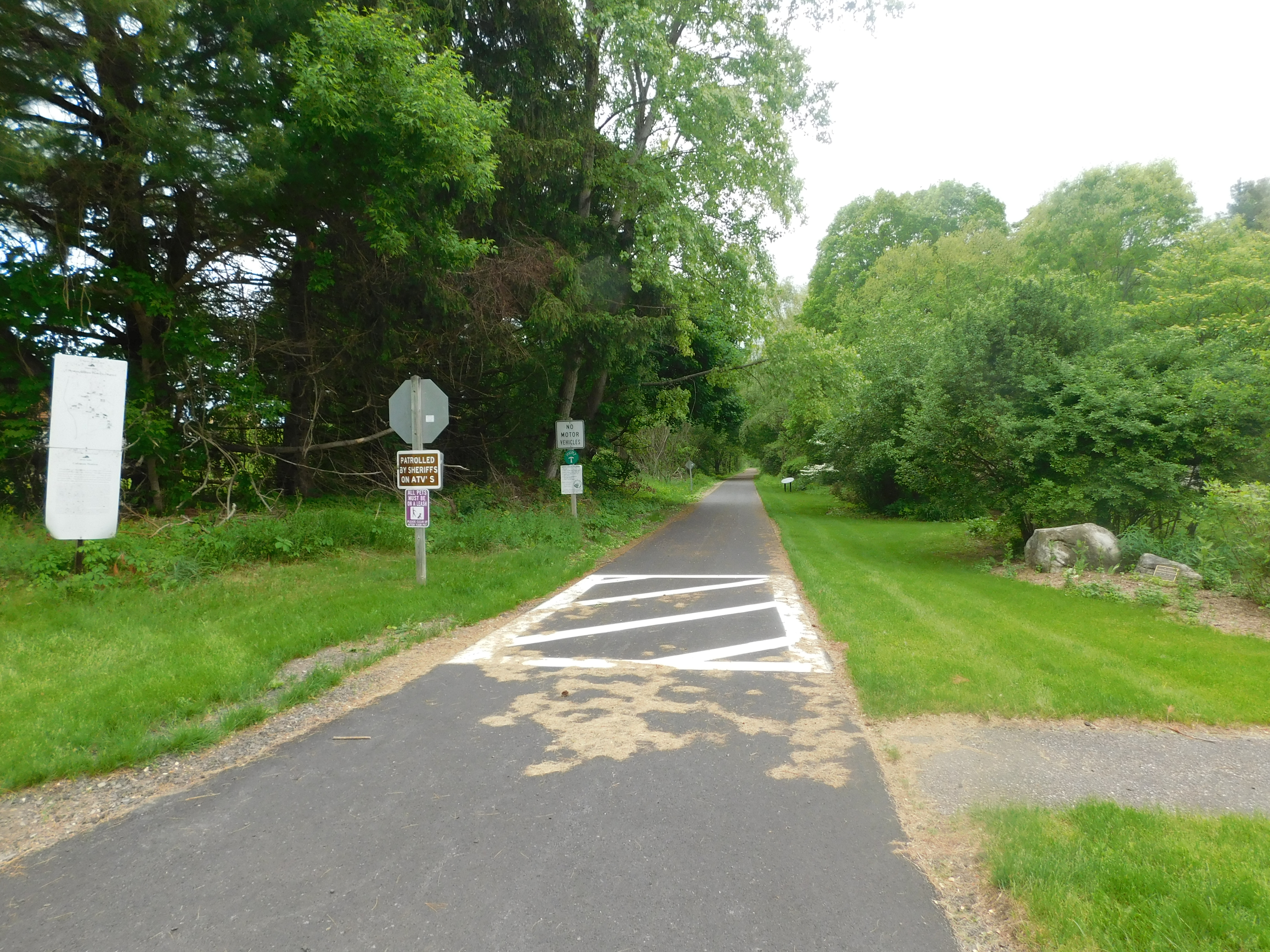
- The Coleman's station site in May 2025 after construction of the Harlem Valley Rail Trail.

General information
- Location: 512 Coleman Station Road (CR 58), Millerton, New York 12546
- Coordinates: 41°54′7″N 73°31′6″W
- Tracks: 1

Other information
- Fare zone: 12

History
- Opened: May 10, 1852

Former services
Preceding station	New York Central Railroad	Following station
Sharon toward New York	Harlem Division	Millerton toward Chatham

U.S. Historic district – Contributing property
- Official name: Coleman's Railroad Station Site
- Designated: September 30, 1993
- Part of: Coleman Station Historic District
- Reference no.: 93000945
- Architectural style: None Specified
Location

The Coleman's station was a former New York Central Railroad station that served the residents of North East, New York.

== History ==
When the New York and Harlem Railroad began building their line through the Taconic Mountains towards Chatham in 1851, Coleman's was recommended as a freight only station by local entrepreneur Amasa Coleman, and landowner Oliver Barrett in order to take up a service overflow from Sharon and Millerton stations. The station which was established in 1852 operated primarily as a freight stop throughout the 19th and early 20th centuries, but began accepting passengers by the late 1950s. As with the rest of the Harlem Line it became a Penn Central station when NYC merged with their longtime rival Pennsylvania Railroad in 1968. Penn Central ended all passenger service north of Dover Plains on March 20, 1972 and the station resumed its freight only status until March 27, 1980 when Conrail abandoned service on that segment of the line.

Today it is located along the Harlem Valley Rail Trail in the middle of the Coleman Station Historic District.
