= Sharon station (New York Central Railroad) =

Former train station for Amenia, New York

Sharon
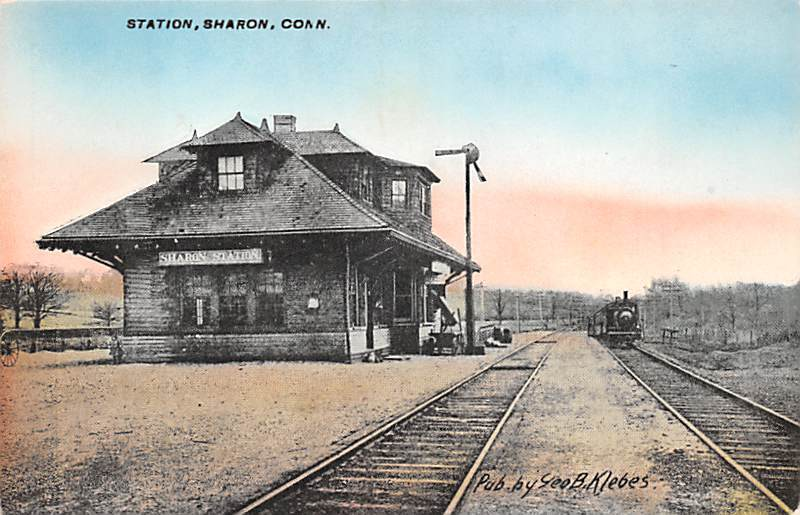
- An early postcard of Sharon station

General information
- Location: 396 Sharon Station Road, Amenia, New York 12501
- Coordinates: 41.8834°N 73.5196°W
- Tracks: 1

Other information
- Fare zone: 12

History
- Opened: Mid-1870s

Former services
Preceding station	New York Central Railroad	Following station
Amenia toward New York	Harlem Division	Coleman's toward Chatham
Location

The Sharon station was one of two former New York Central Railroad (NYC) stations that served the residents of Amenia, New York via the Harlem Line.

== History ==
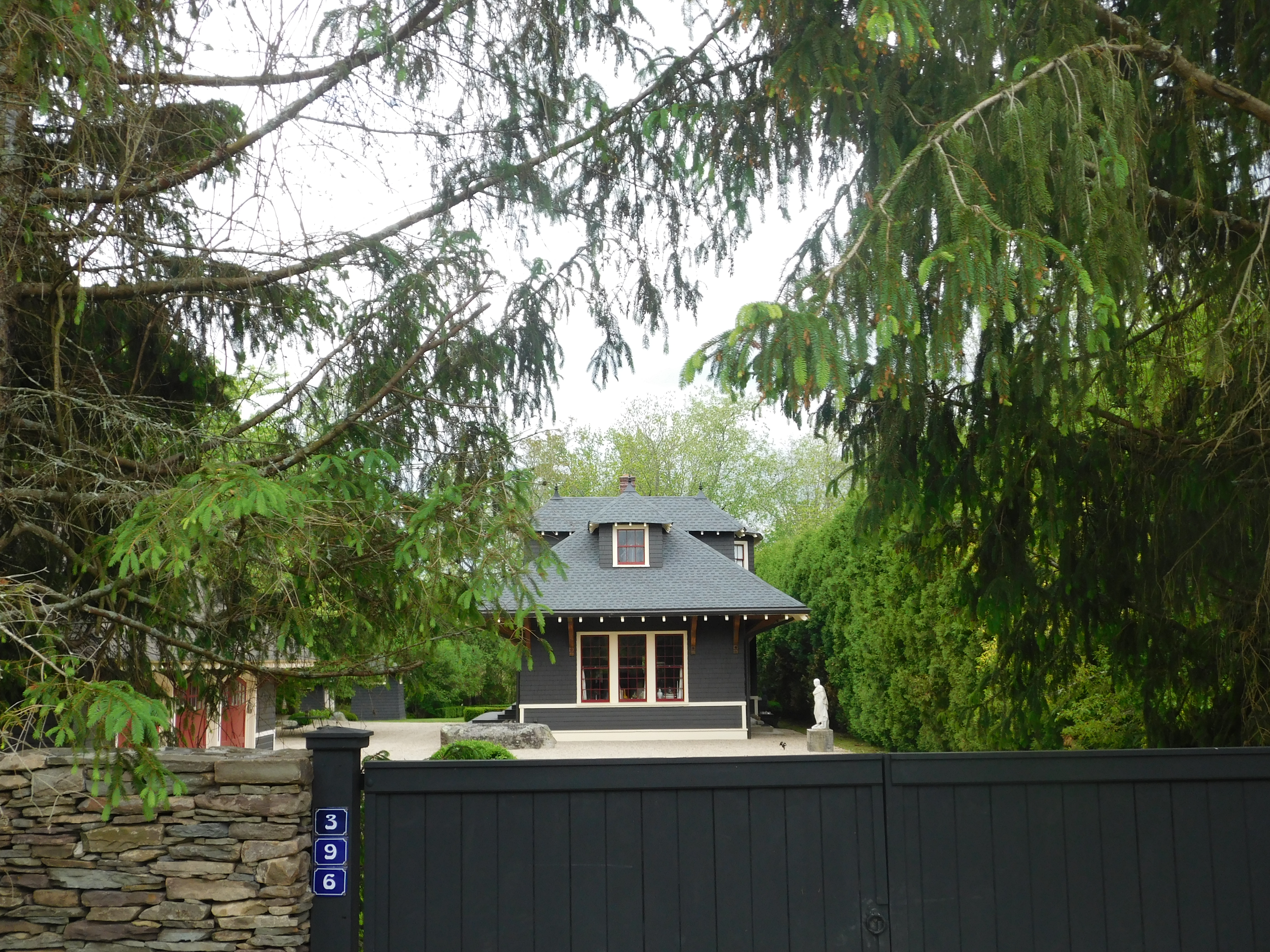
The former station in Sharon in May 2025

This station was named for and served the nearby town of Sharon, Connecticut. Despite its name, Sharon station is not actually located in Sharon but is located over the state border and catered to the residents of Sharon. It was a much closer commute to Sharon station than to the Danbury station to the south.

Depending on the source, Sharon station began serving both passengers and freight in either 1873 or 1875. It was one of the stations on the Harlem Line to serve the Berkshire Hills Express and other limited stop trains that went from New York City all the way to Pittsfield, Massachusetts and North Adams, Massachusetts in the Berkshires. Such through trains were replaced by shuttle transfers in 1950. The station building was damaged by a fire in 1997, but was bought by a local family and restored. Sharon Station still exists today and has been converted into a residence, while the railroad line was converted into the Harlem Valley Rail Trail.
