= Corporate farming =

Large-scale agriculture driven by big business

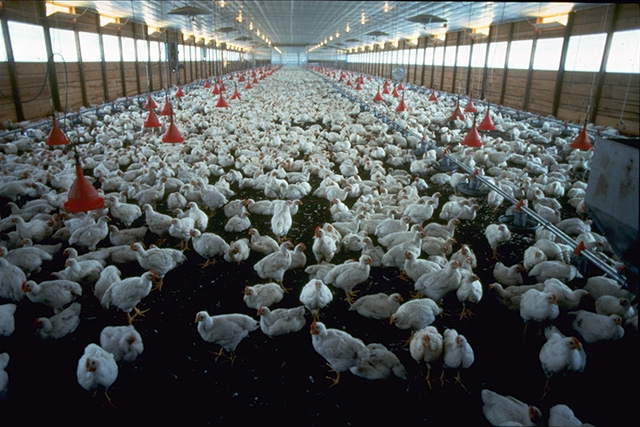
The US poultry industry is often used as an example of corporate farming due to the influence of large integrators like Tyson Foods and Perdue Farms

Corporate farming (also known as Big Agriculture or Big Ag in the United States and Canada) is the practice of large-scale industrial agriculture on farms owned or greatly influenced by large companies. This includes corporate ownership of farms and the sale of agricultural products, as well as the roles of these companies in influencing agricultural education, research, and public policy through funding initiatives and lobbying efforts.

The definition and effects of corporate farming on agriculture are widely debated, though sources that describe large businesses in agriculture as "corporate farms" may portray them negatively.

== Definitions and usage ==
The varied and fluid meanings of "corporate farming" have resulted in conflicting definitions of the term, with implications in particular for legal definitions.

=== Legal definitions ===
Most legal definitions of corporate farming in the United States pertain to tax laws, anti-corporate farming laws, and census data collection. These definitions mostly reference farm income, indicating farms over a certain threshold as corporate farms, as well as ownership of the farm, specifically targeting farms that do not pass ownership through family lines.

=== Common definitions ===
In public discourse, the term "corporate farming" lacks a firmly established definition and is variously applied. However, several features of the term's usage frequently arise:

1. It is largely used as a pejorative with strong negative connotations.
2. It most commonly refers to corporations that are large-scale farms, market agricultural technologies (in particular pesticides, fertilizers, and GMO's), have significant economic and political influence, or some combination of the three.
3. It is usually used in opposition to family farms and new agricultural movements, such as sustainable agriculture and the local food movement.

==== Family farms ====
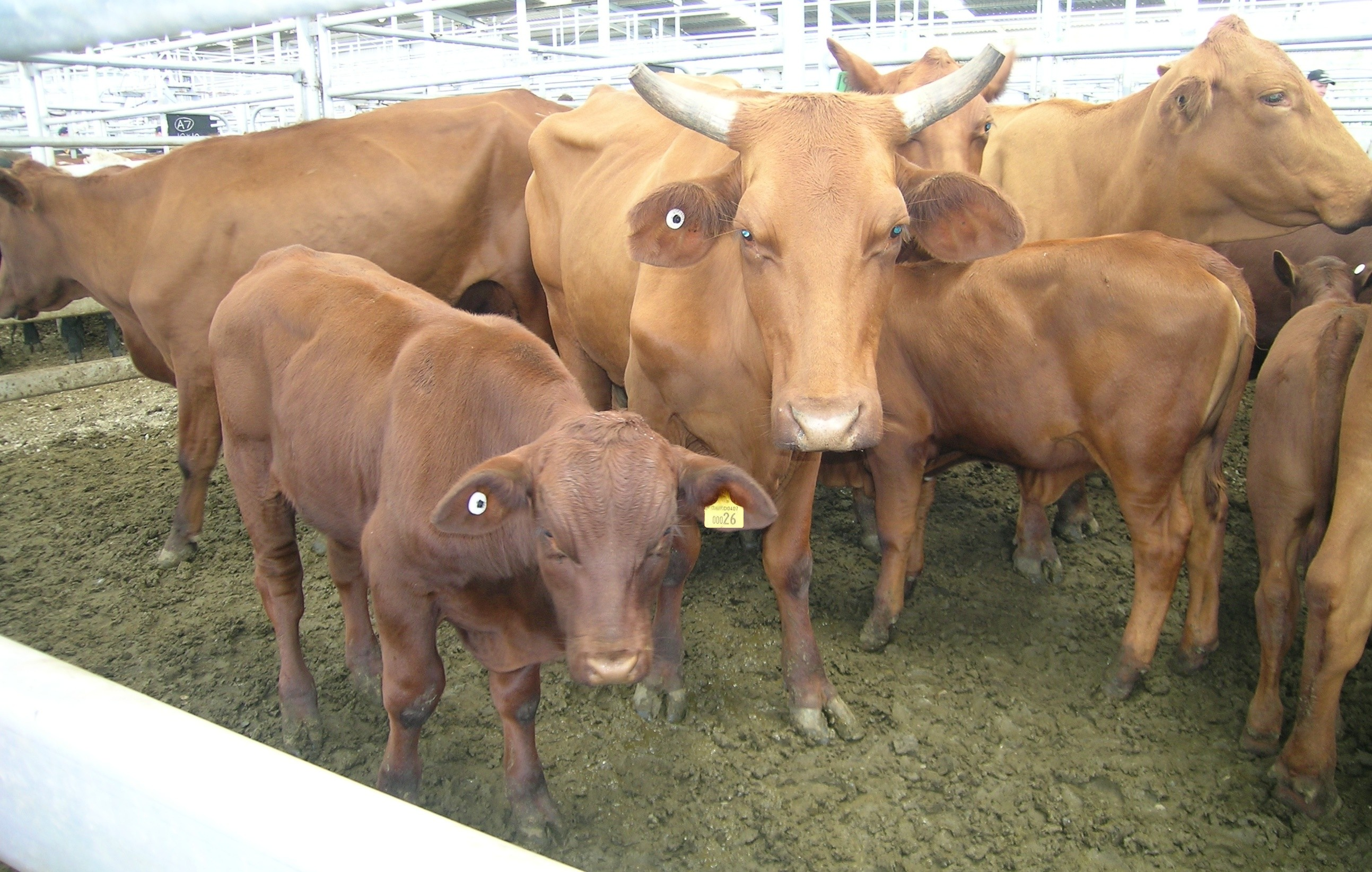
The Nunley Brothers Ranch in Sabinal, Texas has been family owned and operated for over 70 years. The ranch is also among the largest private landowners in the US.

"Family farm" and "corporate farm" are often defined as mutually exclusive terms, with the two having different interests. This mostly stems from the widespread assumption that family farms are small farms while corporate farms are large-scale operations. While it is true that the majority of small farms are family owned, many large farms are also family businesses, including some of the largest farms in the US.

According to the Food and Agricultural Organization of the United Nations (FAO), a family farm "is a means of organizing agricultural, forestry, fisheries, pastoral and aquaculture production which is managed and operated by a family and predominantly reliant on family labour, both women's and men's. The family and the farm are linked, coevolve and combine economic, environmental, reproductive, social and cultural functions."

Additionally, there are large economic and legal incentives for family farmers to incorporate their businesses.

==== Contract farming ====
Farming contracts are agreements between a farmer and a buyer that stipulates what the farmer will grow and how much they will grow usually in return for guaranteed purchase of the product or financial support in purchase of inputs (e.g. feed for livestock growers). In most instances of contract farming, the farm is family owned while the buyer is a larger corporation. This makes it difficult to distinguish the contract farmers from "corporate farms," because they are family farms but with significant corporate influence. This subtle distinction left a loop-hole in many state laws that prohibited corporate farming, effectively allowing corporations to farm in these states as long as they contracted with local farm owners.

==== Non-farm entities ====
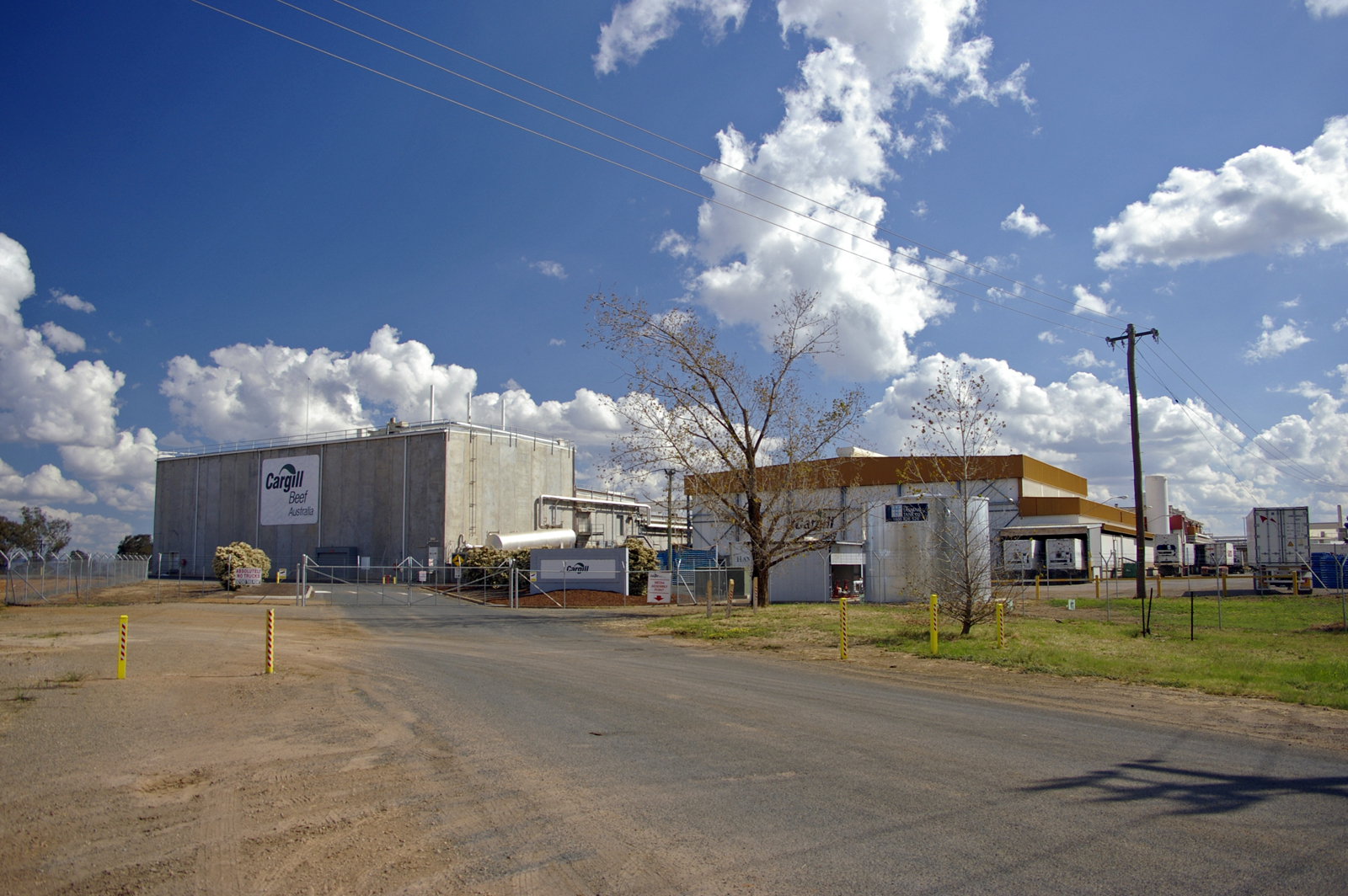
Cargill beef processing plant in Australia.

Many people also choose to include non-farming entities in their definitions of corporate farming. Beyond just the farm contractors mentioned above, these types of companies commonly considered part of the term include Cargill, Monsanto, and DuPont Pioneer among others. These corporations do not have production farms, meaning they do not produce a significant amount of farm products. However, their role in producing and selling agricultural supplies and their purchase and processing of farm products often leads to them being grouped with corporate farms. While this is technically incorrect, it is widely considered substantively accurate because including these companies in the term "corporate farming" is necessary to describe their real influence over agriculture.

== North America ==
In Canada, 17.4 percent of farms are owned by family corporations and 2.4 percent by non-family corporations. In Canada (as in some other jurisdictions) conversion of a sole proprietorship family farm to a family corporation can have tax planning benefits, and in some cases, the difference in combined provincial and federal taxation rates is substantial. Also, for farm families with significant off-farm income, incorporating the farm can provide some shelter from high personal income tax rates. Another important consideration can be some protection of the corporate shareholders from liability. Incorporating a family farm can also be useful as a succession tool, among other reasons because it can maintain a family farm as a viable operation where subdivision of the farm into smaller operations among heirs might result in farm sizes too small to be viable.

The 2012 US Census of Agriculture indicates that 5.06 percent of US farms are corporate farms. These include family corporations (4.51 percent) and non-family corporations (0.55 percent). Of the family farm corporations, 98 percent are small corporations, with 10 or fewer stockholders. Of the non-family farm corporations, 90 percent are small corporations, with 10 or fewer stockholders. Non-family corporate farms account for 1.36 percent of US farmland area. Family farms (including family corporate farms) account for 96.7 percent of US farms and 89 percent of US farmland area; a USDA study estimated that family farms accounted for 85 percent of US gross farm income in 2011. Other farmland in the US is accounted for by several other categories, including single proprietorships where the owner is not the farm operator, non-family partnerships, estates, trusts, cooperatives, collectives, institutional, research, experimental and American Indian Reservation farms.

In the US, the average size of a non-family corporate farm is 1078 acres, i.e. smaller than the average family corporate farm (1249 acres) and smaller than the average partnership farm (1131 acres).

=== US farm laws ===
To date, nine US states have enacted laws that restrict or prohibit corporate farming. The first of these laws were enacted in the 1930s by Kansas and North Dakota respectively. In the 1970s, similar laws were passed in Iowa, Minnesota, Missouri, South Dakota and Wisconsin. In 1982, after failure to pass an anti–corporate farming law, the citizens of Nebraska enacted by initiative a similar amendment into their state constitution. The citizens of South Dakota similarly amended their state constitution in 1998.

All nine laws have similar content. They all restrict corporate ability to own and operate on farmland. They all outline exceptions for specific types of corporations. Generally, family farm corporations are exempted, although certain conditions may have to be fulfilled for such exemption (e.g. one or more of: shareholders within a specified degree of kinship owning a majority of voting stock, no shareholders other than natural persons, limited number of shareholders, at least one family member residing on the farm). However, the laws vary significantly in how they define a corporate farm, and in the specific restrictions. Definitions of a farm can include any and all farm operations, or be dependent on the source of income, as in Iowa, where 60 percent of income must come from farm products. Additionally, these laws can target a corporation's use of the land, meaning that companies can own but not farm the land, or they may outright prohibit corporations from buying and owning farmland. The precise wording of these laws has significant impact on how corporations can participate in agriculture in these states with the ultimate goal of protecting and empowering the family farm.

== Europe ==
Family farms across Europe are heavily protected by EU regulations, which have been driven in particular by French farmers and the French custom splitting land inheritance between children to produce many very small family farms. In regions such as East Anglia, UK, some agribusiness is practiced through company ownership, but most large UK land estates are still owned by wealthy families such as traditional aristocrats, as encouraged by favourable inheritance tax rules.

Most farming in the Soviet Union and its Eastern Bloc satellite states was collectivized. After the dissolution of those states via the revolutions of 1989 and the dissolution of the Soviet Union, decades of decollectivization and land reform have occurred, with the details varying substantially by country.

== Asia ==
=== Pakistan ===
As Pakistan's population surged, it gradually turned from a net food exporter to a net food importer, straining Pakistan's economy and food security. In response, the Pakistani military has led an initiative to set up corporate farming, a project called the Green Pakistan Initiative, and therefore drastically grow more essential food supplies for both sustenance and exports.

== Africa ==
Corporate farming has begun to take hold in some African countries, where listed companies such as Zambeef, Zambia are operated by MBAs as large businesses. In some cases, this has caused debates about land ownership where shares have been bought by international investors, especially from China.

== Middle East ==
Some oil-rich middle east countries operate corporate farming including large-scale irrigation of desert lands for cropping, sometimes through partially or fully state-owned companies, especially with regards to water resource management.

== See also ==
- Agribusiness
- Agricultural education
- Food industry
- History of agriculture
- Intensive farming
- List of agricultural universities and colleges
- Organic farming
- Outline of agriculture
- Sustainable agriculture
- United States Department of Agriculture
