= North East, New York =

- Town
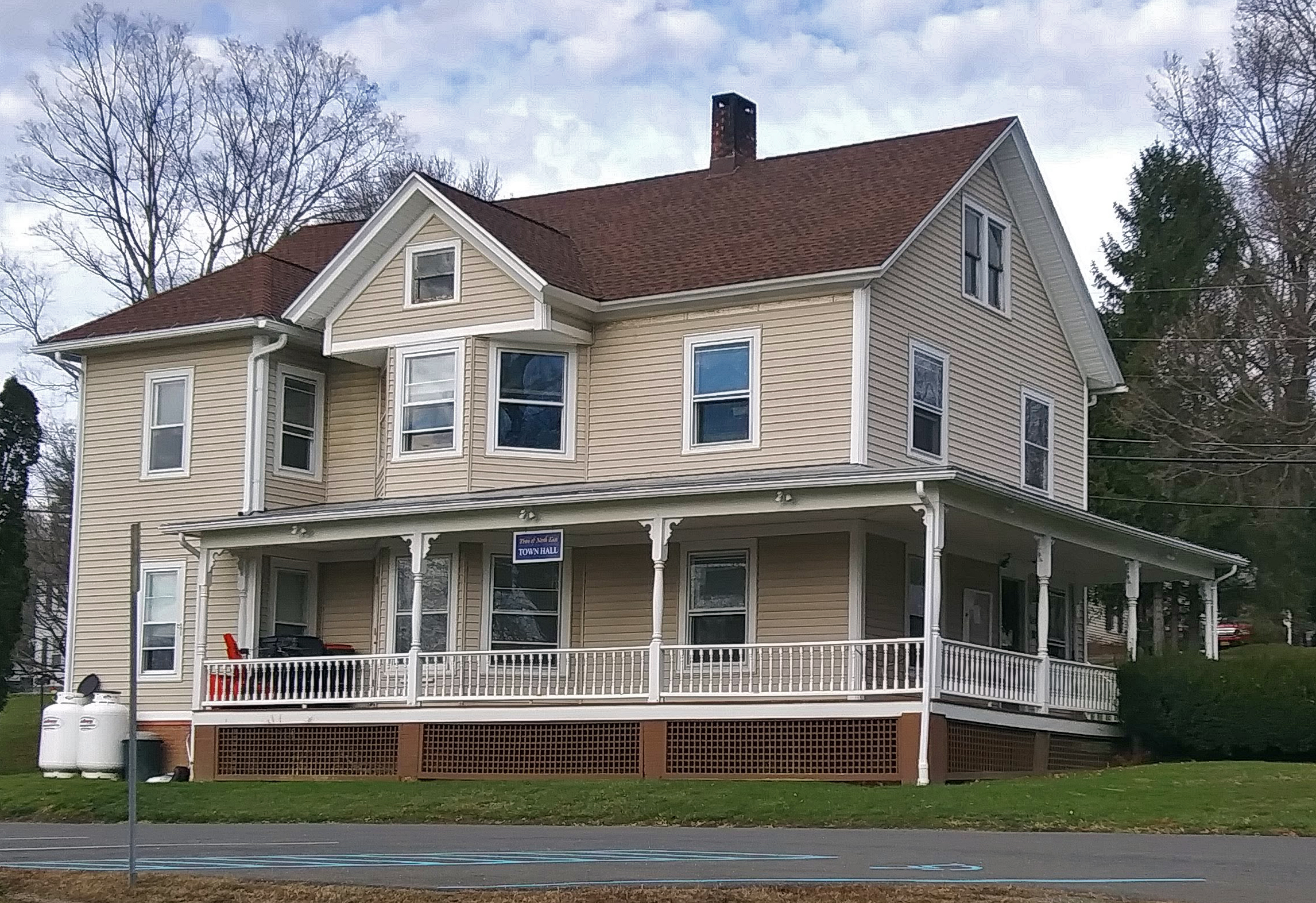
- Town hall, in the village of Millerton

- Seal

- Location of North East, New York

- Location within the state of New York
- Coordinates: 41°56′45″N 73°31′38″W
- Country: United States
- State: New York
- County: Dutchess

Government
  - Type: Town Council
  - Town Supervisor: George Kaye (R)
  - Deputy Supervisor: John Merwin (R)
  - Town Council: Members' List: • Ralph Fedele (D); • Chris Kennan (D); • John Midwood (D)

Area
  - Total: 43.72 sq mi (113.24 km^{2})
  - Land: 43.15 sq mi (111.77 km^{2})
  - Water: 0.57 sq mi (1.47 km^{2})
- Elevation: 1,109 ft (338 m)

Population (2020)
  - Total: 2,971
  - Density: 68.8/sq mi (26.58/km^{2})
- Time zone: UTC-5 (EST)
  - Summer (DST): UTC-4 (EDT)
- ZIP Codes: 12546 (Millerton); 12501 (Pine Plains); 12567 (Amenia)
- Area codes: 518, 838
- FIPS code: 36-027-51891
- GNIS feature ID: 0979285
- Website: www.townofnortheastny.gov

North East is a town in Dutchess County, New York, United States. The population was 3,031 at the 2020 census. The town is in the northeastern corner of the county. U.S. Route 44 crosses the town.

== History ==
The town of North East takes its name from its position in the county.

Part of the town was from the Great Nine Partners Patent of 1697, and part was from the Little Nine Partners Patent of 1706. The town was first settled by people from Connecticut, who located here from 1725–30, in a separate area called "The Oblong", which was not part of the Patent.

The Town of Northeast was formed in 1788. Parts of the town were taken to form the towns of Milan (1818) and Pine Plains (1823).

In 1807, and for some time thereafter, a traveling Methodist minister would preach once a fortnight. A slate company was formed in the town in 1812. During the Revolutionary War, iron ore was taken former the former Maltby ore bed (then known as the Dakin ore bed) to cast cannon for the irregular forces.

== Geography ==
According to the United States Census Bureau, the town has a total area of 43.7 square miles (113.2 km^{2}), of which 43.2 square miles (111.8 km^{2}) is land and 0.54 square miles (1.4 km^{2}), or 1.28%, is water.

The northern town line is the border of Columbia County, but a small part of the northern town line borders Mount Washington, Massachusetts. The eastern town line is the border of Connecticut.

Brace Mountain's 2,311-foot (704 m) summit, near the Connecticut state line in the northeastern corner of town, is the highest point in Dutchess County. The lowest elevation is 530 feet (160 m), along Shekomeko Creek at the Pine Plains town line.

== Demographics ==
Historical population
Census	Pop.	Note	%±
1820	2,037		—
1830	1,689		−17.1%
1840	1,385		−18.0%
1850	1,555		12.3%
1860	1,735		11.6%
1870	2,179		25.6%
1880	2,181		0.1%
1890	2,026		−7.1%
1900	2,047		1.0%
1910	2,110		3.1%
1920	1,922		−8.9%
1930	2,119		10.2%
1940	2,201		3.9%
1950	2,308		4.9%
1960	2,489		7.8%
1970	2,730		9.7%
1980	2,877		5.4%
1990	2,918		1.4%
2000	3,002		2.9%
2010	3,031		1.0%
2020	2,971		−2.0%
U.S. Decennial Census

At the 2000 census, there were 3,002 people, 1,146 households and 778 families residing in the town. The population density was 69.2 inhabitants per square mile (26.7/km^{2}). There were 1,366 housing units at an average density of 31.5 per square mile (12.2/km^{2}). The racial makeup of the town was 95.60% White, 2.10% African American, 0.10% Native American, 0.57% Asian, 0.03% Pacific Islander, 0.70% from other races, and 0.90% from two or more races. Hispanic or Latino of any race were 3.26% of the population.

There were 1,146 households, of which 28.7% had children under the age of 18 living with them, 54.7% were married couples living together, 9.7% had a female householder with no husband present, and 32.1% were non-families. 25.7% of all households were made up of individuals, and 11.1% had someone living alone who was 65 years of age or older. The average household size was 2.50 and the average family size was 2.97.

23.1% of the population were under the age of 18, 9.2% from 18 to 24, 26.7% from 25 to 44, 27.0% from 45 to 64, and 14.0% who were 65 years of age or older. The median age was 40 years. For every 100 females, there were 98.2 males. For every 100 females age 18 and over, there were 94.3 males.

The median household income was $42,038 and the median family income was $48,179. Males had a median income of $30,659 compared with $26,346 for females. The per capita income for the town was $24,650. About 7.0% of families and 12.3% of the population were below the poverty line, including 17.1% of those under age 18 and 10.7% of those age 65 or over.

== Notable people ==
- Timothy T. Lockwood, former mayor of Buffalo, New York
- Heman Lowry, U.S. Marshal for Vermont

== Communities and locations in North East ==
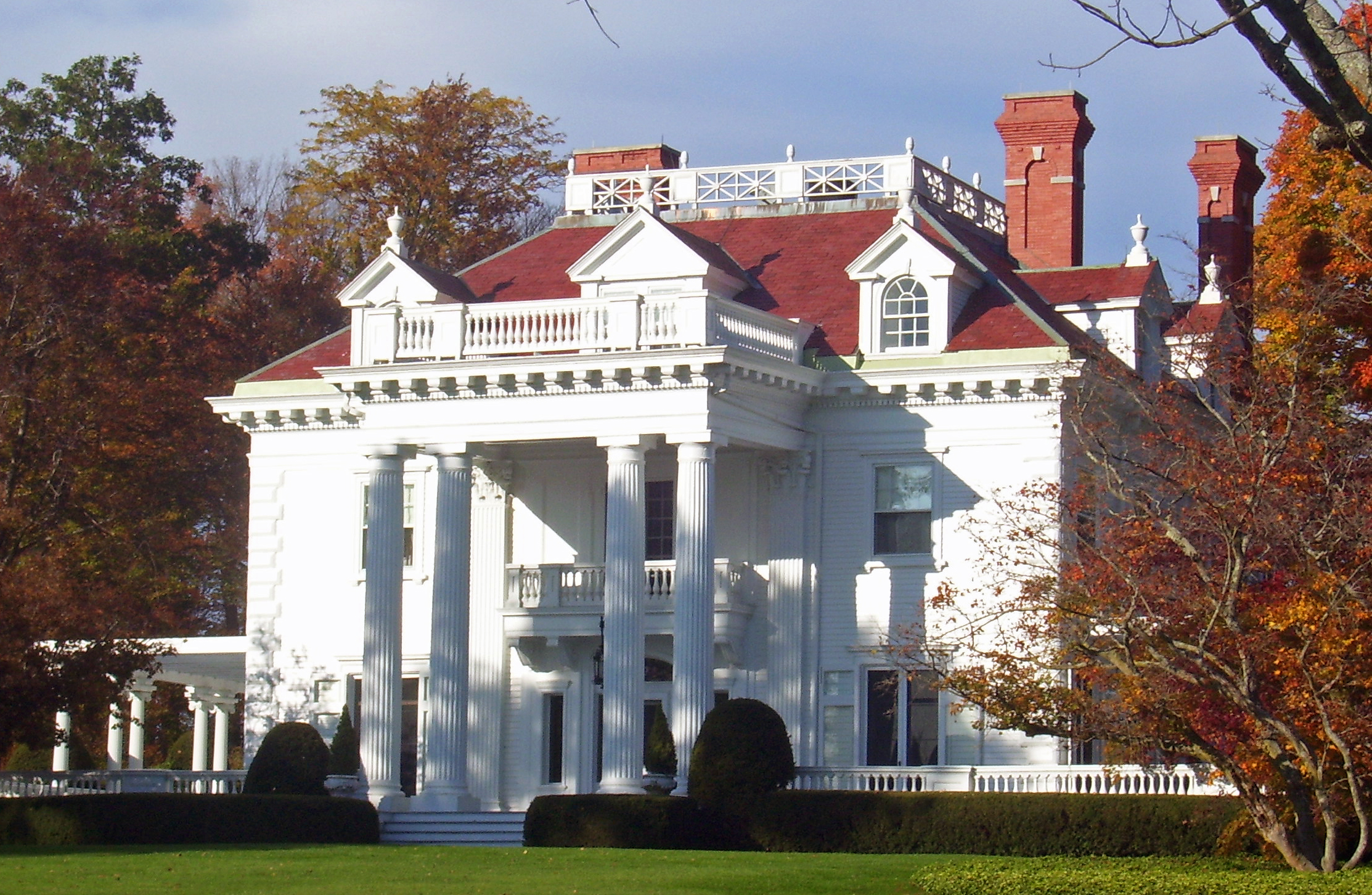
Hiddenhurst

- Boston Corner – a hamlet at the northern town line; portions of the hamlet are in Ancram in Columbia County.
- Coleman Station – a hamlet in the southern part of the town.
- Irondale – a hamlet northwest of Millerton village. The oldest mill in the town of Northeast was built by James Winchell, which stood at what is now called Irondale.
- Millerton – the Village of Millerton is on Route 44 near the Connecticut border.
- Mount Riga – a hamlet in the northern part of the town.
- Northeast – a location southwest of Northeast Center.
- Northeast Center – a hamlet southwest of Millerton on Route 44.
- Oblong – a former community in the town.
- Perry Corners – a location in the southern part of the town.
- Sharon Station – a hamlet on the southern town line.
- Shekomeko – a hamlet in the southwestern part of the town.
- Spencer's Corners – a hamlet named after early settler Philip Spencer, northeast of Millerton.
- State Line – a hamlet east of Millerton village on the New York–Connecticut border.
- Taconic State Park – a state park in the northern part of the town.
- Whitehouse Crossing – a hamlet in the northern part of the town.
