= Harlem Valley Rail Trail =

Paved rail trail in New York, US

Coordinates: 41°50′53″N 73°32′58″W

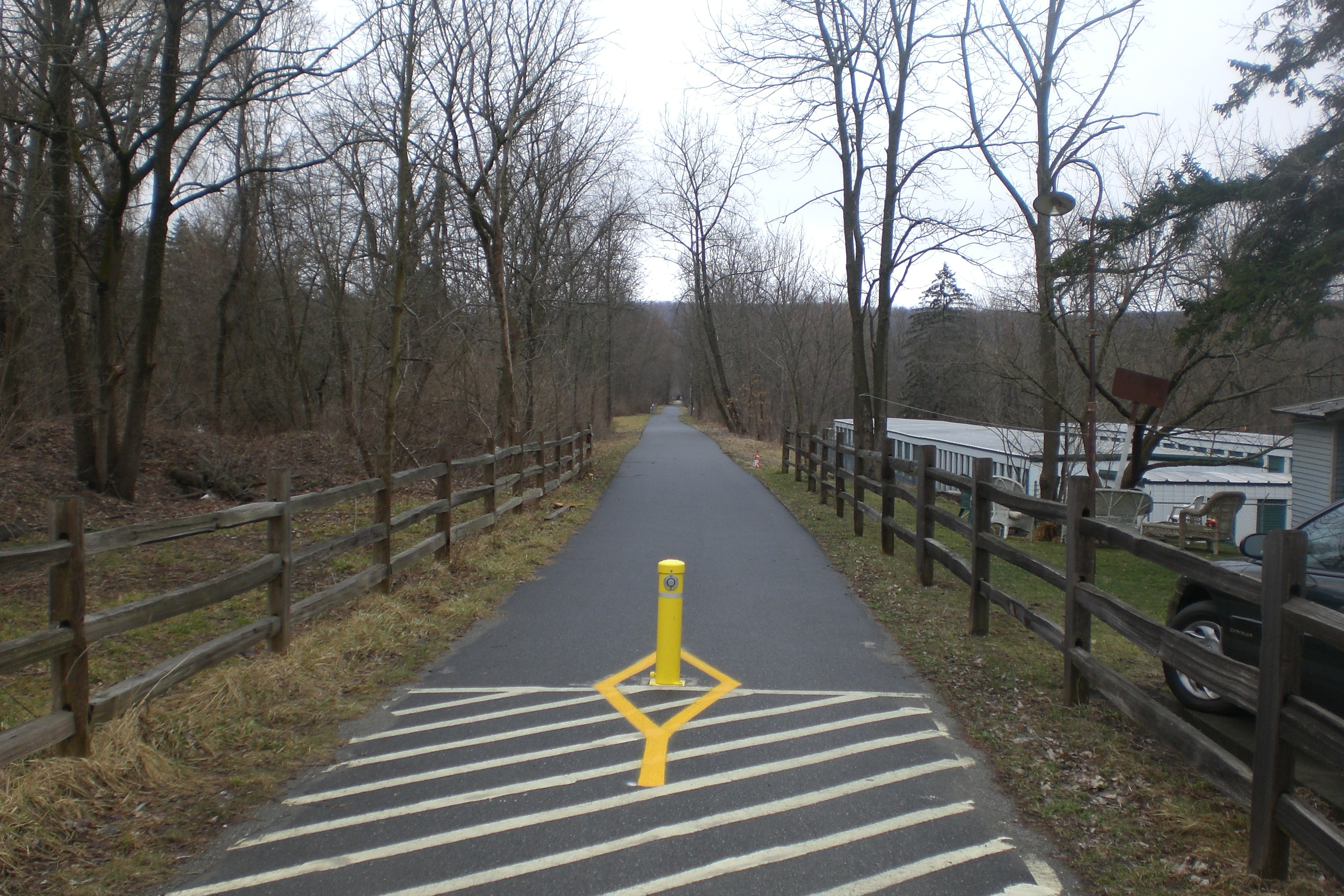
- Site of the former Amenia station
- Length: 26 mi (42 km)
- Location: Dutchess and Columbia counties, New York
- Trailheads: Wassaic and Taconic State Park
- Use: Hiking
- Website: hvrt.org

The Harlem Valley Rail Trail is a paved rail trail on an abandoned portion of the New York and Harlem Railroad, north of the hamlet of Wassaic and accessible by train, one mile north of the start at the Metro-North Railroad Harlem Line terminus in Wassaic. It is owned by the New York State Office of Parks, Recreation and Historic Preservation (OPRHP). It is maintained through an agreement between OPRHP, Dutchess County and the Harlem Valley Rail Trail Association, a private not-for-profit organization.

The former New York and Harlem main line was acquired by the New York Central Railroad in 1864, and became part of the Penn Central Railroad (PC) in 1968. After PC declared bankruptcy in 1970, passenger service between Dover Plains and Chatham ceased by 1972, though freight service continued over the line until 1976, when it was abandoned between Millerton and Ghent. The rest of the line was abandoned in 1980, but Metro-North restored service between Dover Plains and Wassaic in 2000. The abandoned rail line was converted into a public park in 1989. The rail trail first opened in 1996. It has been expanded northward to Taconic State Park with plans for an extension to Chatham.
