= Red Hook Central School District =

School district in New York, United States

Address
- 9 Mill Rd Red Hook, NY, 12571; United States

District information
- Grades: PK–12
- Schools: 4
- NCES District ID: 3624240

Students and staff
- Students: 1,602 (2023–24)
- Teachers: 160.29 (on an FTE basis)
- Student–teacher ratio: 9.99

Other information
- Website: Red Hook Central School District

Red Hook Central School District is a school district in New York State.

Most of the district is in Dutchess County, where it includes most of the town of Red Hook and portions of the towns of Milan and Rhinebeck. The villages of Tivoli and Red Hook are in the district boundary, as well as the hamlets of: Annandale-on-Hudson, Barrytown, and Upper Red Hook. The district extends into Germantown Town, Columbia County.

== History ==
Janet Warden became the superintendent of the district in 2023.

Bond elections were held in 2022, with $21,920,000 for renovations of school buildings was approved on a 647-438 basis, while a $5,240,000 proposal for upgrades of other facilities was declined on a 647-431 basis. In 2023, the budget was approved by voters, who also approved purchases of three buses.

== Schools ==
- Red Hook High School (9–12)
- Linden Avenue Middle School (6–8)
- Mill Road Intermediate School (3–5)
- Mill Road Primary School (PK–2)
