= Dutchess County, New York =

County in New York, United States

- County
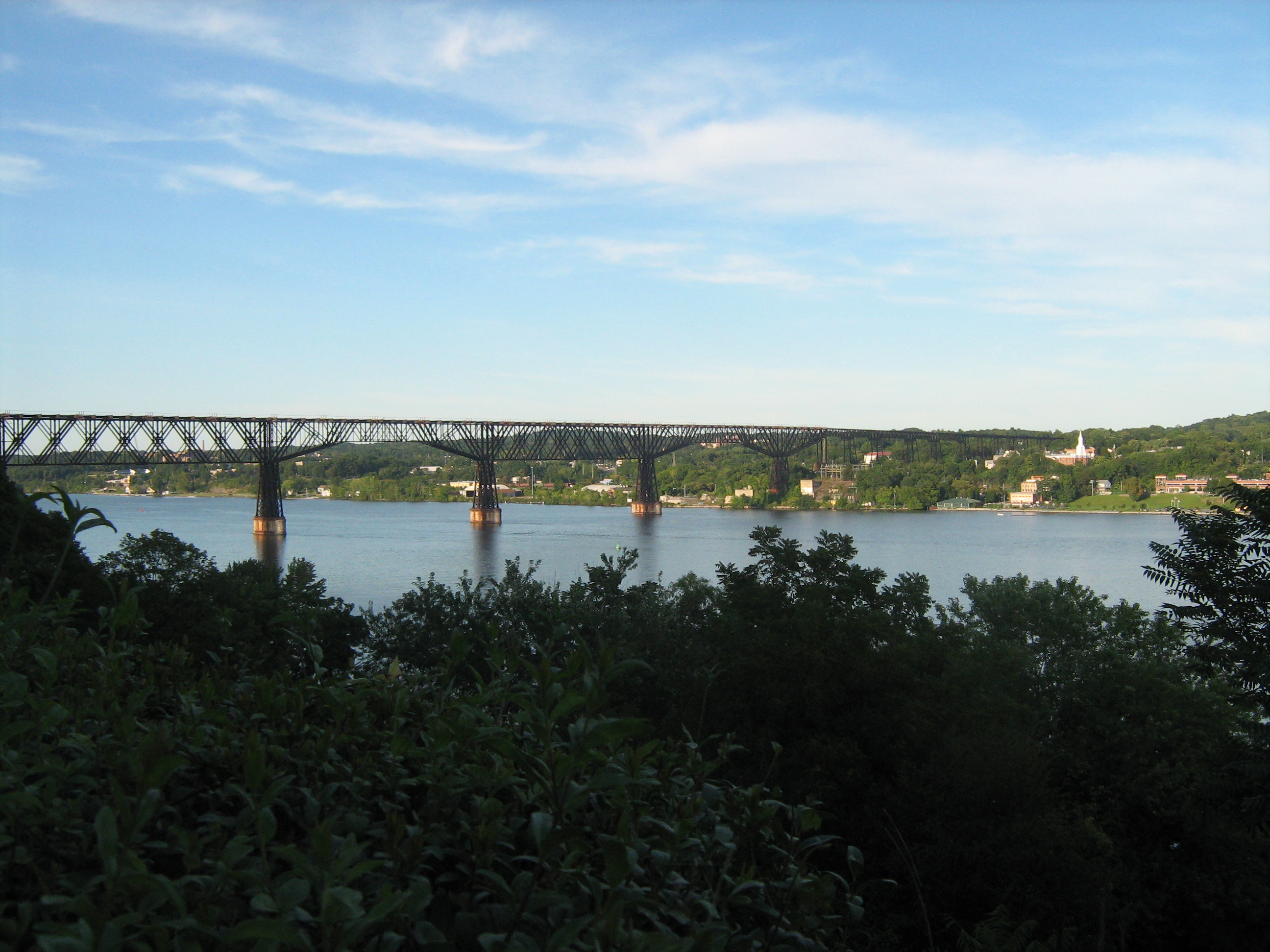
- Walkway over the Hudson with the City of Poughkeepsie in the background and the Hudson River in the foreground.

- Flag Seal

- Location within the U.S. state of New York
- Coordinates: 41°46′N 73°45′W
- Country: United States
- State: New York
- Founded: November 1, 1683; 343 years ago (Note: "When, in 1682, Colonel Thomas Dongan was appointed Governor of the Province of New York, he was instructed to form a council of not more than ten of the 'most eminent Inhabitants' who were to assist him in the making of 'fit' laws. One of the first acts authorized by this council was the erection of twelve 'countyes,' on which Dutchess was one (November 1, 1683).") (Note: "There were too few inhabitants of Dutchess at its erection for it to be represented separately in the General Assembly, so that it was provisionally attached to Ulster until 1713.")
- Named for: Mary of Modena, Duchess of York
- Seat: Poughkeepsie
- Largest city: Poughkeepsie

Government
  - Executive: Sue Serino (R)

Area
  - Total: 825 sq mi (2,140 km^{2})
  - Land: 796 sq mi (2,060 km^{2})
  - Water: 30 sq mi (78 km^{2})

Population (2020)
  - Total: 295,911
  - Estimate (2025): 300,708 ▲
  - Density: 372/sq mi (144/km^{2})
- Time zone: UTC−5 (Eastern)
  - Summer (DST): UTC−4 (EDT)
- Area code: 845, 518, 838
- Congressional districts: 17th, 18th
- Website: www.dutchessny.gov

Dutchess County is a county in the U.S. state of New York. As of the 2020 census, the population was 295,911. The county seat is the city of Poughkeepsie. The county was created in 1683, one of New York's first twelve counties, and later organized in 1713. Dutchess County is part of the Kiryas Joel–Poughkeepsie–Newburgh metropolitan area, which belongs to the larger New York–Newark–Bridgeport, NY-NJ-CT-PA Combined Statistical Area. The county is part of the Hudson Valley region of the state.

== History ==
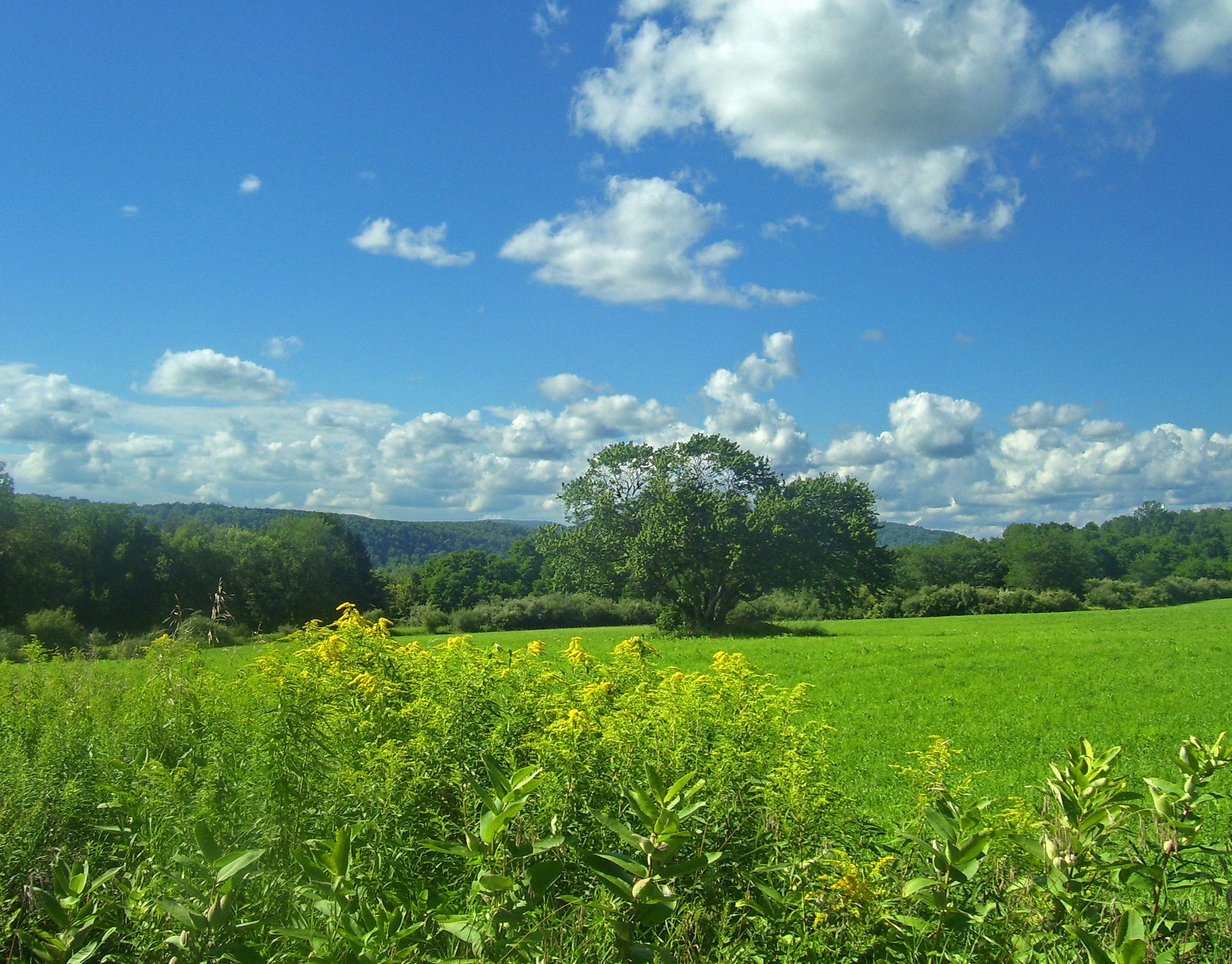
View of Harlem Valley from Appalachian Trail in Pawling

Before Anglo-Dutch settlement, what is today Dutchess County was a leading center for the indigenous Wappinger peoples. They had their council-fire at what is now Fishkill Hook, and had settlements throughout the area.

On November 1, 1683, the Province of New York established its first twelve counties, including Dutchess. Its boundaries at that time included the present Putnam County, and a small portion of the present Columbia County (the towns of Clermont and Germantown). The county was named for Mary of Modena, Duchess of York; dutchess is an archaic spelling of the word duchess.

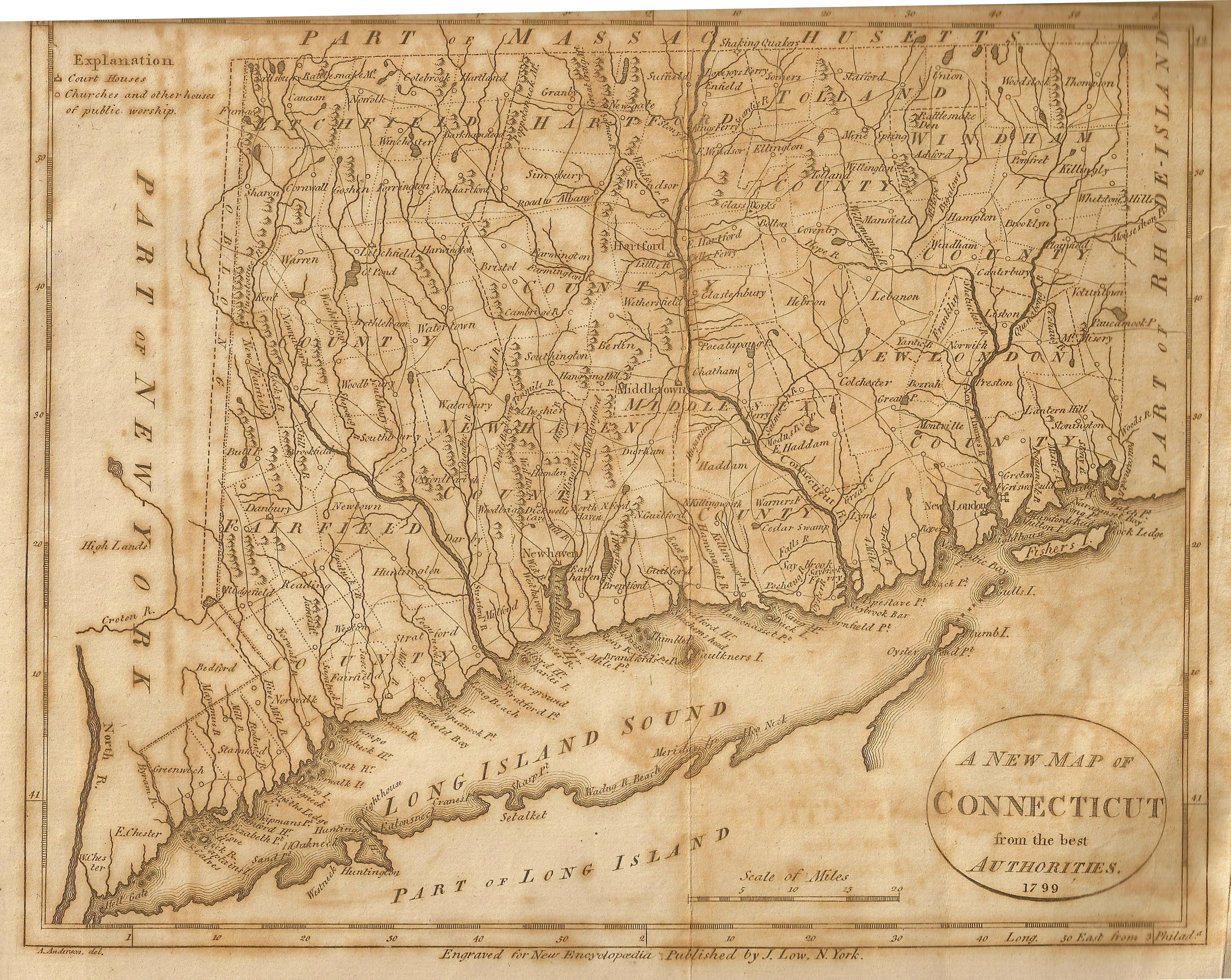
A 1799 map of Connecticut which shows The Oblong (Low's Encyclopaedia)

The Province of New York and the Connecticut Colony negotiated an agreement on November 28, 1683, establishing their border as 20 miles (32 km) east of the Hudson River, north to Massachusetts. The 61,660 acres (249.5 km^{2}) east of the Byram River making up the Connecticut Panhandle were granted to Connecticut, in recognition of the wishes of the residents. In exchange, Rye was granted to New York, along with a 1.81-mile (2.91 km) wide strip of land running north from Ridgefield to Massachusetts alongside the New York counties of Westchester, Putnam then Dutchess, known as "The Oblong". The eastern half of the stub of land in northeast Dutchess County containing Rudd Pond and Taconic State Park is the northernmost extension of The Oblong.

Until 1713, Dutchess was administered by Ulster County. On October 23, 1713, Queen Anne gave permission for Dutchess County to elect its own officers from among their own population, including a supervisor, tax collector, tax assessor and treasurer. In 2013, Dutchess County celebrated its 300th anniversary of democracy based upon a legislative resolution sponsored by County Legislator Michael Kelsey from Salt Point. In 1812, Putnam County was detached from Dutchess.

=== The Patents ===
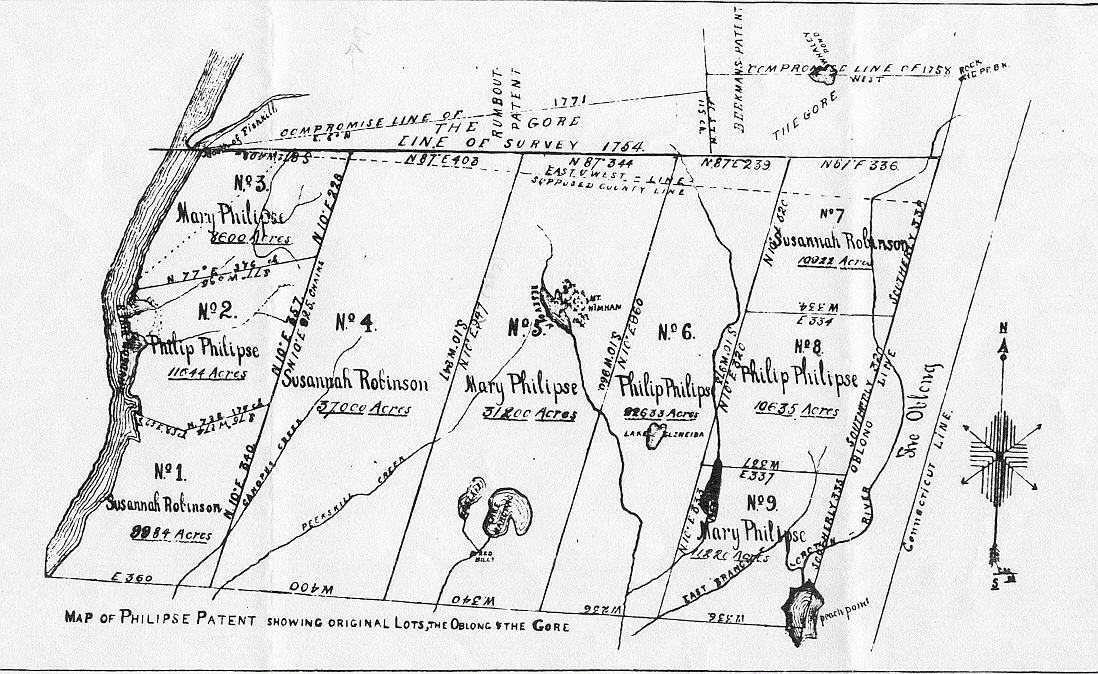
Map of Philipse Patent (showing the Oblong and Gore)

Fourteen royal land patents were granted between 1685 and 1706 covering the entirety of the original footprint of Dutchess County (which until 1812 included today's Putnam County).

The first ten, granted between 1685 and 1697, covered almost all of Hudson River shoreline in the original county, with three - Rombouts, the Great Nine Partners, and Philipse Patents - extending significantly inland. The eleventh, and smallest, Cuyler, 1697, was the first to contain solely inland territory, just in from the Hudson. The twelfth, and next smallest, Fauconnier, in 1705, completed the Hudson River shoreline. The last two, Beekman, 1705, and the Little Nine Partners, 1706, laid claim to the remaining interior lands.

1. 1685 Rombout (Beacon/Fishkill Area)
2. 1686 Minnisinck (Sanders & Harmense)
3. 1686 Kip
4. 1688 Schuyler (Poughkeepsie)
5. 1688 Schuyler (Red Hook)
6. 1688 Ærtsen-Roosa-Elton
7. 1696 Pawling-Staats
8. 1697 Rhinebeck
9. 1697 (Great) Nine Partners
10. 1697 Philipse
11. 1697 Cuyler
12. 1705 Fauconnier
13. 1705 Beekman (Back Lots)
14. 1706 (Little) Nine Partners

=== Early settlement ===
From 1683 to 1715, most of the settlers in Dutchess County were Dutch. Many of these moved in from Albany and Ulster counties. They settled along the Fishkill Creek and in the areas that are now Poughkeepsie and Rhinebeck.

From 1715 to 1730, most of the new settlers in Dutchess county were Germans. From 1730 until 1775, New Englanders were the primary new settlers in Dutchess County. Coles Mills was settled by Elisha Cole from Cape Cod in 1747 at the outlet of Barrett Pond into the West Branch of the Croton River.

=== 20th century ===
Franklin D. Roosevelt was born in Dutchess County. He lived in his family home in Hyde Park, overlooking the Hudson River. His family's home is now the Home of Franklin D. Roosevelt National Historic Site, managed by the National Park Service.

Prior to the 1960s, Dutchess County was primarily agricultural. Since then the southwestern part (from Poughkeepsie southward and from the Taconic State Parkway westward) of the county has developed into a largely residential area, suburban in character, with many of its residents commuting to jobs in New York City and Westchester County. The northern and eastern regions of the county remain rural with large farmlands but at the same time developed residences used during the summer and or on weekends by people living in the New York City urban area.

== Geography ==
According to the U.S. Census Bureau, the county has a total area of 825 square miles (2,140 km^{2}), of which 796 square miles (2,060 km^{2}) is land and 30 square miles (78 km^{2}) (3.6%) is water.

Dutchess County is located in southeastern New York State, between the Hudson River on its west and the New York–Connecticut border on its east, about halfway between the cities of Albany and New York City. It contains two cities: Beacon and Poughkeepsie. Depending on precise location within the county, road travel distance to New York City ranges between 58 and 110 miles (93 and 177 km).

The terrain of the county is mostly hilly, especially in the Hudson Highlands in the southwestern corner and the Taconic Mountains to the northeast. Some areas nearer the river are flatter.

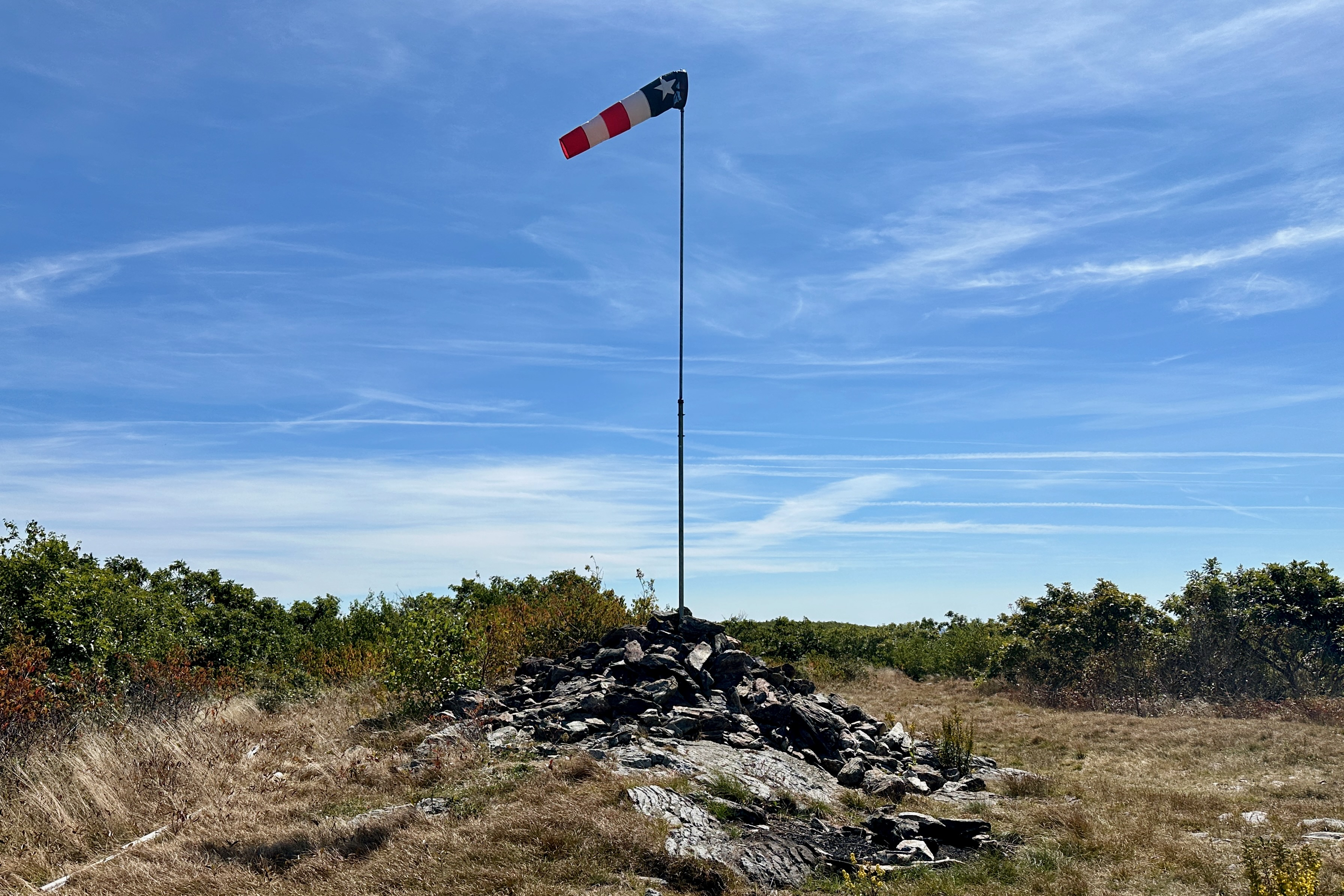
Summit of Brace Mountain, the highest point in Dutchess County

The highest point in the county is the summit of Brace Mountain, in the Taconics, at 2,311 feet (704 m) above sea level. The lowest point is sea level, along the Hudson River. The highest point of neighboring Fairfield County, Connecticut, is a 1,290-foot (390 m) point along the state line in Pawling.

Wappinger Creek, at 41.7 mi (67.1 km) from its source at Thompson Pond in Pine Plains to where it drains into the Hudson at New Hamburg, is the longest stream in the county. Its 211-square-mile (550 km^{2}) watershed is likewise the largest in the county. To its south is the 193-square-mile (500 km^{2}) watershed of Dutchess County's second-longest stream, 33.5 mi (53.9 km) Fishkill Creek, part of which spills over into Putnam County. Within that watershed are the county's third-longest stream, Sprout Creek, and its largest, deepest and highest lakes: Whaley (252 acres (102 ha)), in the town of Pawling; Sylvan (143 ft (44 m)) in the town of Beekman and Beacon Reservoir, in the town of Fishkill, at 1,285 ft (392 m) respectively.

Other, smaller tributaries of the Hudson such as the Saw Kill drain the northwestern portion of the county. The southeastern fringe of Dutchess is part of the upper Croton River watershed and thus part of the New York City water supply system. On the east, in the Oblong, streams drain into the Housatonic River in adjacent Connecticut.

A border nearly one-half mile (800 m) long exists with Berkshire County, Massachusetts, in the extreme northern end of the county.

=== Adjacent counties ===
- Columbia County – north
- Berkshire County, Massachusetts – northeast
- Litchfield County, Connecticut – east
- Fairfield County, Connecticut – southeast
- Putnam County – south
- Orange County – southwest
- Ulster County – west

=== National protected areas ===
- Appalachian Trail, crosses county from Putnam County line in East Fishkill to Connecticut state line near Wingdale; corridor is partly on federally protected land.
- Eleanor Roosevelt National Historic Site
- Great Thicket National Wildlife Refuge, one of six discontiguous parcels in Dover
- Home of Franklin D. Roosevelt National Historic Site
- Vanderbilt Mansion National Historic Site

=== State, county, and town parks ===
- Bowdoin County Park
- Fahnestock State Park (shared with Putnam County)
- Hudson Highlands State Park (shared with Putnam and Westchester counties)
- Stratt Town Park
- Wilcox County Park
- Tymor Forest
- Taconic State Park
- Beekman Rec
- East Fishkill Rec
- James Baird State Park
- Poughkeepsie Bridge (Walkway over the Hudson)
- Dover Stone Church
- Carnwath Farms Historic Site & Park
- Roosevelt Farm Lane
- Stony Kill Farm
- Mills–Norrie State Park
- Staatsburgh State Historic Site
- Tivoli Bays Unique Area

=== Privately protected open space ===
- Mary Flagler Cary Arboretum
- Ferncliff Forest
- Innisfree Garden
- Pawling Nature Preserve
- Poets' Walk Park
- Thompson Pond and neighboring Stissing Mountain

== Demographics ==
Historical population
Census	Pop.	Note	%±
1790	45,276		—
1800	47,775		5.5%
1810	51,363		7.5%
1820	46,615		−9.2%
1830	50,926		9.2%
1840	52,398		2.9%
1850	58,992		12.6%
1860	64,941		10.1%
1870	74,041		14.0%
1880	79,184		6.9%
1890	77,879		−1.6%
1900	81,670		4.9%
1910	87,661		7.3%
1920	91,747		4.7%
1930	105,462		14.9%
1940	120,542		14.3%
1950	136,781		13.5%
1960	176,008		28.7%
1970	222,295		26.3%
1980	245,055		10.2%
1990	259,462		5.9%
2000	280,150		8.0%
2010	297,488		6.2%
2020	295,911		−0.5%
2025 (est.)	300,708	▲	1.6%
U.S. Decennial Census; 1790–1960 1900–1990; 1990–2000 2010–2020

=== 2020 census ===
Dutchess County, New York – Racial and ethnic composition Note: the US Census treats Hispanic/Latino as an ethnic category. This table excludes Latinos from the racial categories and assigns them to a separate category. Hispanics/Latinos may be of any race.
Race / Ethnicity (NH = Non-Hispanic)	Pop 1980	Pop 1990	Pop 2000	Pop 2010	Pop 2020	% 1980	% 1990	% 2000	% 2010	% 2020
White alone (NH)	218,545	222,791	224,913	221,812	198,495	89.18%	85.87%	80.28%	74.56%	67.08%
Black or African American alone (NH)	16,726	20,558	25,059	27,395	30,126	6.83%	7.92%	8.94%	9.21%	10.18%
Native American or Alaska Native alone (NH)	393	337	465	465	387	0.16%	0.13%	0.17%	0.16%	0.13%
Asian alone (NH)	2,850	5,761	6,990	10,330	10,635	1.16%	2.22%	2.50%	3.47%	3.59%
Native Hawaiian or Pacific Islander alone (NH)	x	x	75	80	67	x	x	0.03%	0.03%	0.02%
Other race alone (NH)	688	250	465	725	1,956	0.28%	0.10%	0.17%	0.24%	0.66%
Mixed race or Multiracial (NH)	x	x	4,123	5,414	12,021	x	x	1.47%	1.82%	4.06%
Hispanic or Latino (any race)	5,853	9,765	18,060	31,267	42,224	2.39%	3.76%	6.45%	10.51%	14.27%
Total	245,055	259,462	280,150	297,488	295,911	100.00%	100.00%	100.00%	100.00%	100.00%

=== 2000 census ===
As of the census of 2000, there were 280,150 people, 99,536 households, and 69,177 families residing in the county. The population density was 350 inhabitants per square mile (140/km^{2}). There were 106,103 housing units at an average density of 132 units per square mile (51/km^{2}). 22.0% of the population was of Italian, 16.9% Irish, 11.3% German and 6.7% English ancestry according to Census 2000. 88.3% spoke English and 4.8% spoke Spanish.

Based on the Census Ancestry tallies, including people who listed more than one ancestry, Italians were the largest group in Dutchess County with 60,645. Irish came in a very close second at 59,991. In third place were the 44,915 Germans who barely exceeded the 44,078 people not in the 105 specifically delineated ancestry groups.

There were 99,536 households, out of which 34.5% had children under the age of 18 living with them, 55.5% were married couples living together, 10.3% had a female householder with no husband present, and 30.5% were non-families. 24.6% of all households were made up of individuals, and 9.0% had someone living alone who was 65 years of age or older. The average household size was 2.63 and the average family size was 3.16.

As of Q4 2021, the median home value in Dutchess County was $365,199, an increase of 13.8% from the prior year.

In the county, the age distribution of the population shows 25.1% under the age of 18, 9.4% from 18 to 24, 30.2% from 25 to 44, 23.2% from 45 to 64, and 12.0% who were 65 years of age or older. The median age was 37 years. For every 100 females, there were 100.1 males. For every 100 females age 18 and over, there were 98.2 males.

The median income for a household in the county was $53,086, and the median income for a family was $63,254. Males had a median income of $45,576 versus $30,706 for females. The per capita income for the county was $23,940. About 5.0% of families and 7.5% of the population were below the poverty line, including 8.5% of those under age 18 and 6.5% of those age 65 or over.

The decrease in population between 1810 and 1820 was due to the separation of Putnam County from Dutchess in 1812.

=== Racial demographics ===
As of 2017, the residents of Dutchess County were reported as the following: American Indian and Alaska Native (0.04%), Asian (4%), Black or African American (8.5%), Hispanic or Latino (12.5%), Native Hawaiian and Other Pacific Islander (0.016%), Some Other Race (0.35%), Two or More Races (3%), White (71%).

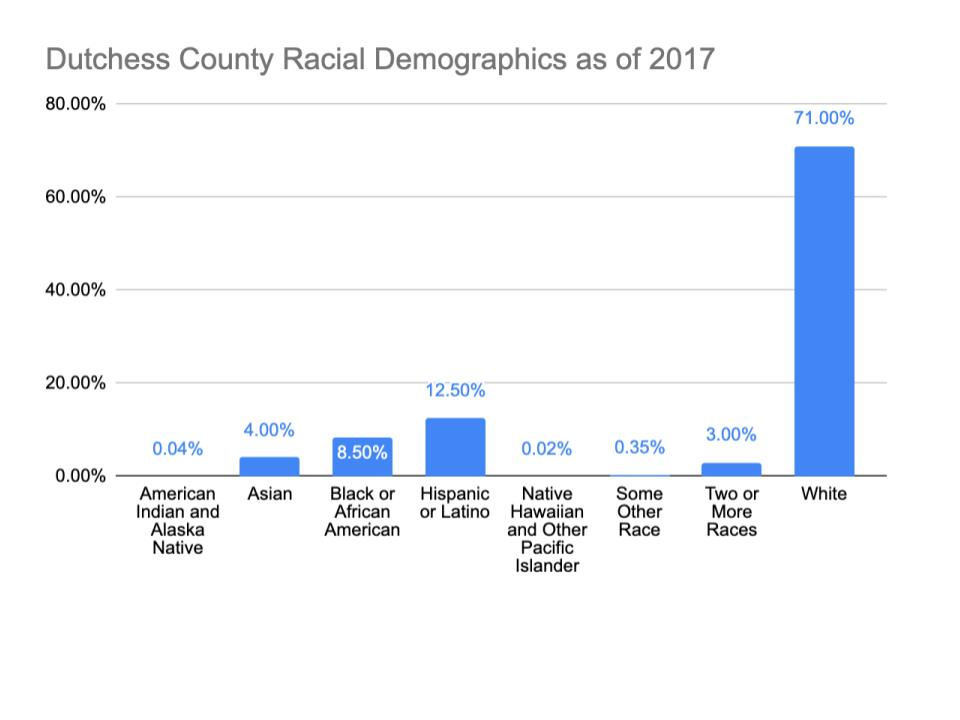
Dutchess County Racial Demographics Chart

== Government ==
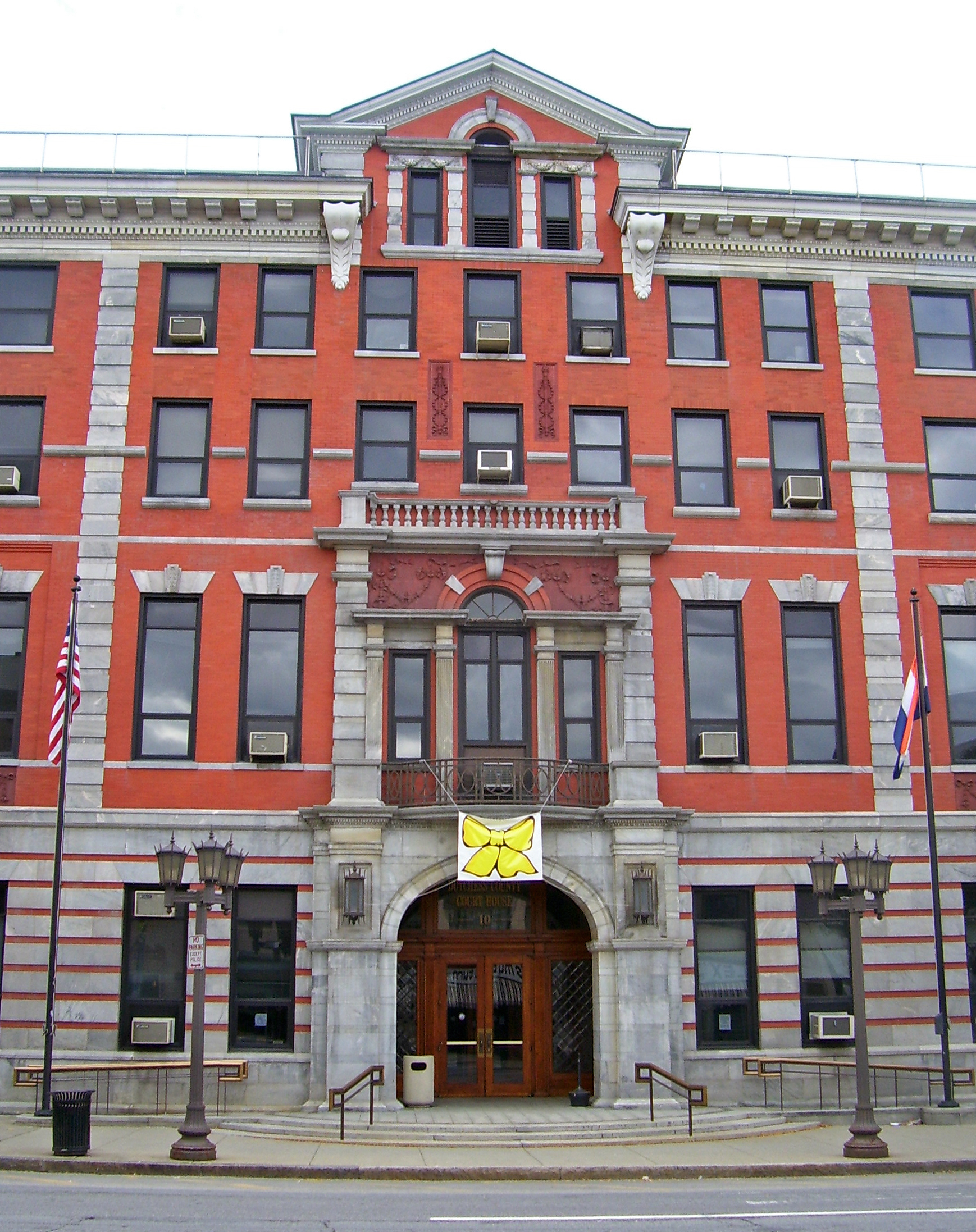
The current Dutchess County Court House, built in 1903, stands on the same site as the original 1720 building

Dutchess County has a Charter Government with a County Executive and directly elected legislature of 25 members, each elected from a single member district. The Charter form of Government went in to effect in 1968 as a result of 1967 special election dedicated to the question. From 1713 until 1967, the County Government had been managed by a Board of Supervisors, made up of the locally elected leaders.

Dutchess County Executives
Name	Party	Term
David C. Schoentag	Republican	January 1, 1968 – December 31, 1971
Edward C. Scheuler	Republican	January 1, 1976 – April 29, 1978
James D. Benson	Republican	April 29, 1978 – December 31, 1978
Lucille P. Pattison	Democratic	January 1, 1979 – December 31, 1991
William R. Steinhaus	Republican	January 1, 1992 – December 31, 2011
Marcus J. Molinaro	Republican	January 1, 2012 – January 2, 2023
William F.X. O'Neil	Republican	January 3, 2023 – December 31, 2023
Sue Serino	Republican	January 1, 2024 – Present

Dutchess County Legislature (2026-2027)
District	Legislator	Title	Party	Town/City
1	Trevor Redl		Democratic	Poughkeepsie
2	Emma Arnoff		Democratic	Pleasant Valley
3	Michael Polasek	Minority Leader	Republican	LaGrange
4	Brendan Lawler		Democratic	Hyde Park
5	Anna Shah		Democratic	Poughkeepsie
6	Lisa R. Kaul		Democratic	Poughkeepsie
7	Lew Darrow		Republican	Hyde Park
8	Craig P. Brendli		Democratic	Poughkeepsie
9	Barrington R. Atkins	Majority Leader	Democratic	Poughkeepsie
10	Randy Johnson		Democratic	Poughkeepsie
11	Brennan Kearney		Democratic	Rhinebeck
12	John D. Metzger	Assistant Minority Leader	Republican	East Fishkill
13	Kevin M. Giles		Republican	East Fishkill
14	Alix Winsby		Democratic	Wappinger
15	Robert S. Faust		Republican	Wappinger
16	Yvette Valdés Smith	Chair	Democratic	Fishkill
17	Doug McHoul		Republican	Fishkill
18	Molly Rhodes		Democratic	Beacon
19	Chris Drago		Democratic	Stanford
20	Kristofer Munn	Assistant Majority Leader	Democratic	Red Hook
21	Stephen M. Caswell		Republican	East Fishkill
22	Joseph Tresca		Republican	Beekman
23	Chris Rolison		Republican	Pawling
24	Andrew J. House		Republican	Dover
25	Eric Alexander		Democratic	Washington

=== Elections ===
United States presidential election results for Dutchess County, New York
Year	Republican		Democratic		Third party(ies)	
Year	No.	%	No.	%	No.	%
1884	9,701	51.13%	8,677	45.73%	596	3.14%
1888	10,265	50.95%	9,249	45.91%	634	3.15%
1892	9,376	48.09%	8,978	46.05%	1,141	5.85%
1896	12,127	62.44%	6,634	34.16%	661	3.40%
1900	11,936	59.39%	7,691	38.27%	471	2.34%
1904	11,709	57.06%	8,275	40.32%	537	2.62%
1908	11,132	53.58%	8,961	43.13%	682	3.28%
1912	8,916	43.65%	8,871	43.43%	2,638	12.92%
1916	11,082	54.60%	8,906	43.88%	310	1.53%
1920	21,152	65.60%	9,938	30.82%	1,156	3.58%
1924	22,173	64.64%	8,864	25.84%	3,266	9.52%
1928	28,687	61.30%	16,748	35.79%	1,366	2.92%
1932	25,757	54.95%	20,374	43.47%	740	1.58%
1936	28,868	53.12%	24,467	45.02%	1,010	1.86%
1940	32,329	55.69%	25,598	44.10%	122	0.21%
1944	32,890	58.92%	22,778	40.80%	158	0.28%
1948	34,067	64.23%	17,439	32.88%	1,533	2.89%
1952	46,381	71.17%	18,644	28.61%	142	0.22%
1956	53,840	78.35%	14,876	21.65%	0	0.00%
1960	46,109	60.67%	29,842	39.26%	53	0.07%
1964	29,503	37.01%	50,179	62.94%	43	0.05%
1968	45,032	54.87%	31,025	37.80%	6,010	7.32%
1972	64,864	69.82%	27,872	30.00%	167	0.18%
1976	51,312	56.94%	37,531	41.65%	1,268	1.41%
1980	53,616	57.65%	28,616	30.77%	10,775	11.59%
1984	70,324	67.89%	32,867	31.73%	389	0.38%
1988	62,165	60.97%	38,968	38.22%	826	0.81%
1992	46,709	40.50%	41,655	36.12%	26,964	23.38%
1996	41,929	40.39%	47,339	45.60%	14,553	14.02%
2000	52,669	47.12%	52,390	46.87%	6,712	6.01%
2004	63,372	51.16%	58,232	47.01%	2,277	1.84%
2008	59,628	45.07%	71,060	53.71%	1,614	1.22%
2012	56,025	45.29%	65,312	52.80%	2,368	1.91%
2016	61,821	47.19%	62,285	47.54%	6,912	5.28%
2020	66,872	44.25%	81,443	53.89%	2,807	1.86%
2024	71,778	46.79%	79,994	52.14%	1,641	1.07%

The composition of the County Legislature is 15 Democrats and 10 Republicans for the 2026-2027 term. County elections occur in odd-numbered years.

Historically, Dutchess County, like most of the lower Hudson, was classic "Yankee Republican" territory. Between 1884 and 2004, the Republican presidential candidate carried Dutchess County in 28 out of 30 elections (1964 and 1996 being exceptions). Even Franklin D. Roosevelt from Hyde Park failed to carry the county during his four campaigns.

The Republican edge narrowed significantly in the 1990s, with George H. W. Bush going from 61 percent of the county's vote in 1988 to only 40.5 percent in 1992, although that likely was affected by the presence of Ross Perot on the ballot as a third-party candidate. In 2008, Barack Obama became only the third Democrat to carry the county since 1884, and the first to win a majority since Lyndon Johnson in 1964. It has gone for the Democratic candidate in five consecutive elections (2008, 2012, 2016, 2020, and 2024), though never by a margin of more than 10%.

Dutchess County is split between two congressional districts. The most southern portion is in the 17th district, represented by Republican Mike Lawler. The rest of the county is in the 18th district, represented by Democrat Pat Ryan. These are considered "swing" districts nationally, with Cook Partisan Voting Index ratings of D +1 and D +2, respectively, as of 2025.

=== Law enforcement ===
The Cities of Beacon and Poughkeepsie; Towns of Fishkill, Hyde Park, Pine Plains, Poughkeepsie, Rhinebeck, Red Hook, and East Fishkill; and Villages of Millerton, Wappingers Falls, and Millbrook, have their own Police departments. The remainder of the county is patrolled by the Dutchess County Sheriff's Office and New York State Police. The New York State Police Troop K headquarters is located in Millbrook.

== Communities ==
N.B.: Cities, Towns and Villages are official political designations.

Dutchess County, New York

=== Cities ===
- Beacon
- Poughkeepsie (county seat)

=== Towns ===
- Amenia
- Beekman
- Clinton
- Dover
- East Fishkill
- Fishkill
- Hyde Park
- La Grange
- Milan
- North East
- Pawling
- Pine Plains
- Pleasant Valley
- Poughkeepsie
- Red Hook
- Rhinebeck
- Stanford
- Union Vale
- Wappinger
- Washington

=== Villages ===
- Fishkill
- Millbrook
- Millerton
- Pawling
- Red Hook
- Rhinebeck
- Tivoli
- Wappingers Falls

=== Census-designated places ===
- Amenia
- Arlington
- Bard College
- Barrytown
- Brinckerhoff
- Chelsea Cove
- Crown Heights
- Dover Plains
- Fairview
- Freedom Plains
- Haviland
- Hillside Lake
- Hopewell Junction
- Hyde Park
- MacDonnell Heights
- Marist College
- Merritt Park
- Myers Corner
- New Hackensack
- New Hamburg
- Pine Plains
- Pleasant Valley
- Red Oaks Mill
- Rhinecliff
- Salt Point
- Shorehaven
- Spackenkill
- Staatsburg
- Titusville
- Upper Red Hook
- Vassar College
- Wassaic
- Wingdale

=== Hamlets ===
- Annandale-on-Hudson
- Arthursburg
- Attlebury
- Bangall
- Barnegat
- Castle Point
- De Witt Mills
- Fishkill Plains
- Glenham
- Gretna
- Holmes
- Hopewell Junction
- Hortontown
- Hughsonville
- Johnsontown
- Knapps Corner
- Lithgow
- Lomala
- Mabbettsville
- McIntyre
- Millbrook
- Norrie Heights
- Pecksville
- Pleasant Plains
- Poughquag
- Quaker Hill
- Rudco
- Shenandoah
- Shekomeko
- Staatsburg
- Stanfordville
- Stissing
- Stormville
- Swartwoutville
- Van Keurens
- Verbank
- Wiccopee
- Willow Brook

== Education ==
=== Public school districts ===
- Arlington Central School District
- Beacon City School District
- Dover Union Free School District
- Hyde Park Central School District
- Millbrook Central School District
- Pawling Central School District
- Pine Plains Central School District
- Poughkeepsie City School District
- Red Hook Central School District
- Rhinebeck Central School District
- Spackenkill Union Free School District
- Wappingers Central School District
- Webutuck Central School District
- Dutchess County BOCES

=== Private schools ===
- Dutchess Day School
- Hawk Meadow Montessori School
- Holy Trinity School
- Millbrook School
- Oakwood Friends School
- Our Lady of Lourdes High School
- Poughkeepsie Day School
- Randolph School
- St. Denis-St. Columba School
- St. Martin de Porres School
- St. Mary School, Fishkill
- St. Mary's School, Wappingers Falls
- Trinity-Pawling School
- Tabernacle Christian Academy
- Upton Lake Christian School

=== Higher education ===
- Bard College (Annandale-on-Hudson)
- Bard College at Simon's Rock (Barrytown)
- Culinary Institute of America main campus (Hyde Park)
- Dutchess Community College (Poughkeepsie)
- Marist University (Poughkeepsie)
- Vassar College (Poughkeepsie)

== Transportation ==
=== Roads ===
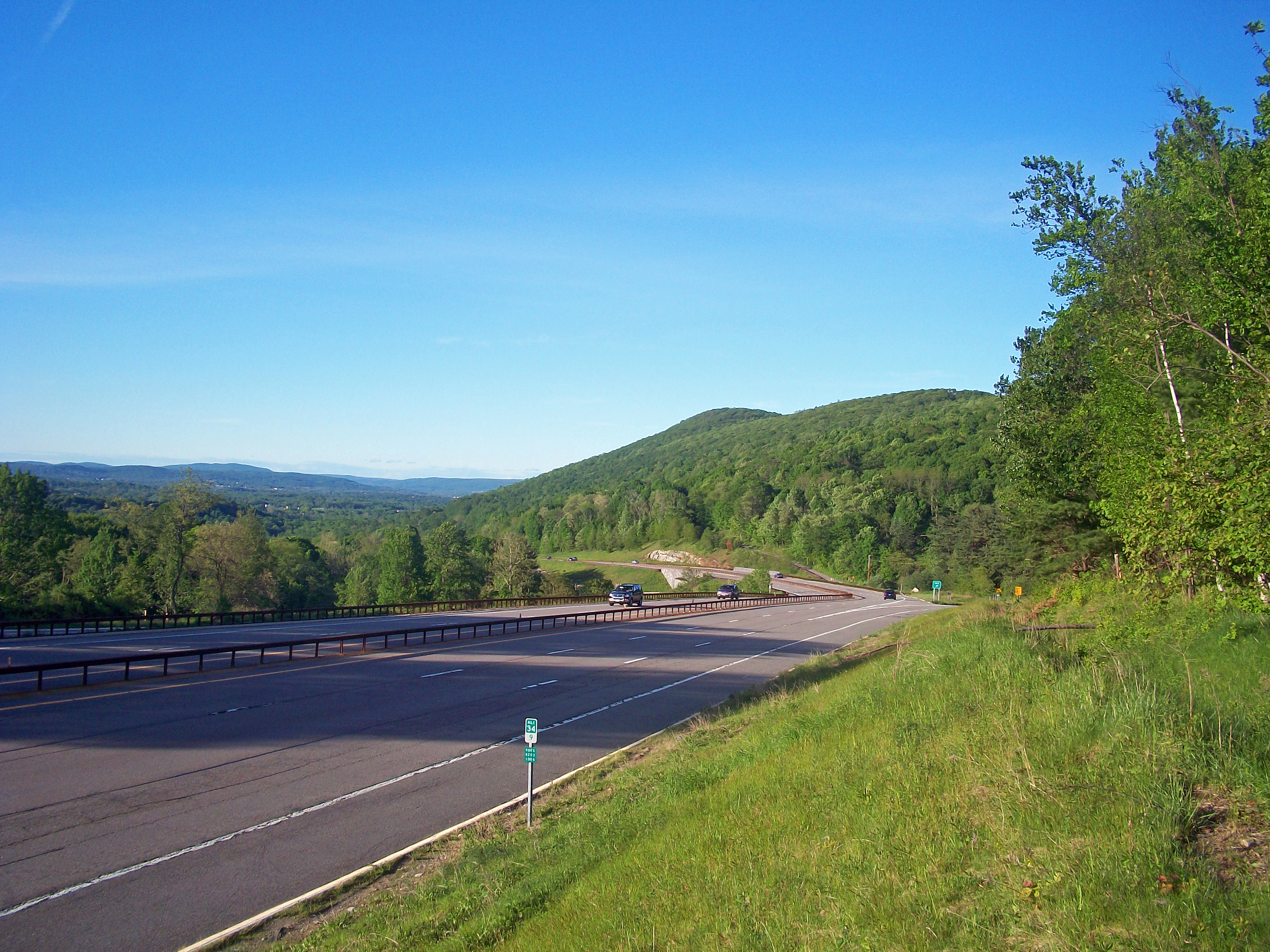
The Taconic Parkway in southern Dutchess County

- Interstate 84 traverses the county in an east–west route cutting through the southwestern quadrant of the county before entering Putnam County. It is the only interstate highway in the county.
- US 9, the Taconic State Parkway (the only other limited-access road in the county besides I-84, although it still has some at-grade intersections), and NY 22 are the main north–south roads in the county. For much of its length the Taconic is paralleled by NY 82. NY 9G leaves US 9 in Poughkeepsie and parallels it north to the Columbia County line.
- US 44, NY 52, NY 55, and NY 199 are the other primary east–west roads in the county. NY 52 enters the county concurrent with I-84, leaves it at Fishkill but then follows it into Putnam County. NY 55 enters the county concurrently with US 44, leaves it at Poughkeepsie, but neither of the two routes encounter each other again within the state.

=== Crossings ===
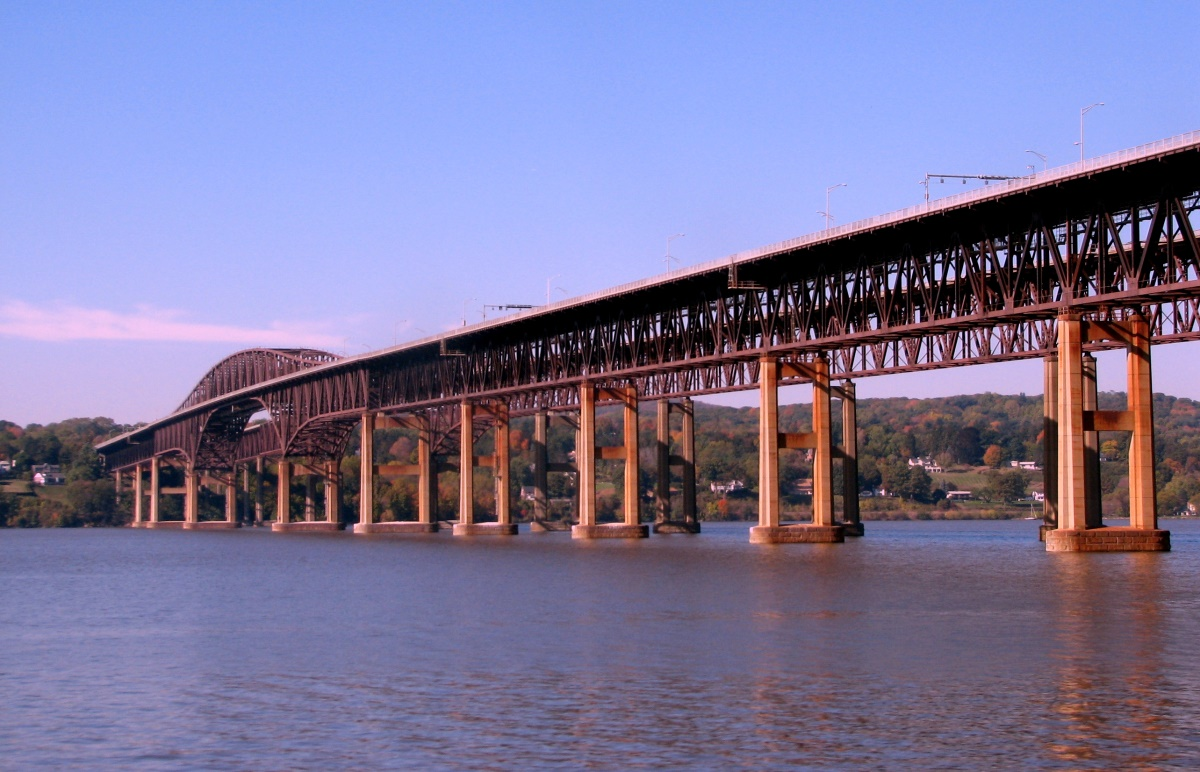
Newburgh-Beacon Bridge

Three spans cross the Hudson River, linking Dutchess with Orange, Ulster, and Greene Counties:

- The Newburgh-Beacon Bridge carries Interstate 84 and NY 52 between Fishkill/Beacon and Newburgh (Orange County). The westbound span opened in 1963 and the eastbound span opened in 1980.
- The Mid-Hudson Bridge carries US 44 and NY 55 between Poughkeepsie and Highland (Town of Lloyd, Ulster County)
- The Kingston-Rhinecliff Bridge carries NY 199 between Rhinebeck and Kingston (Ulster County)

=== Railroads ===
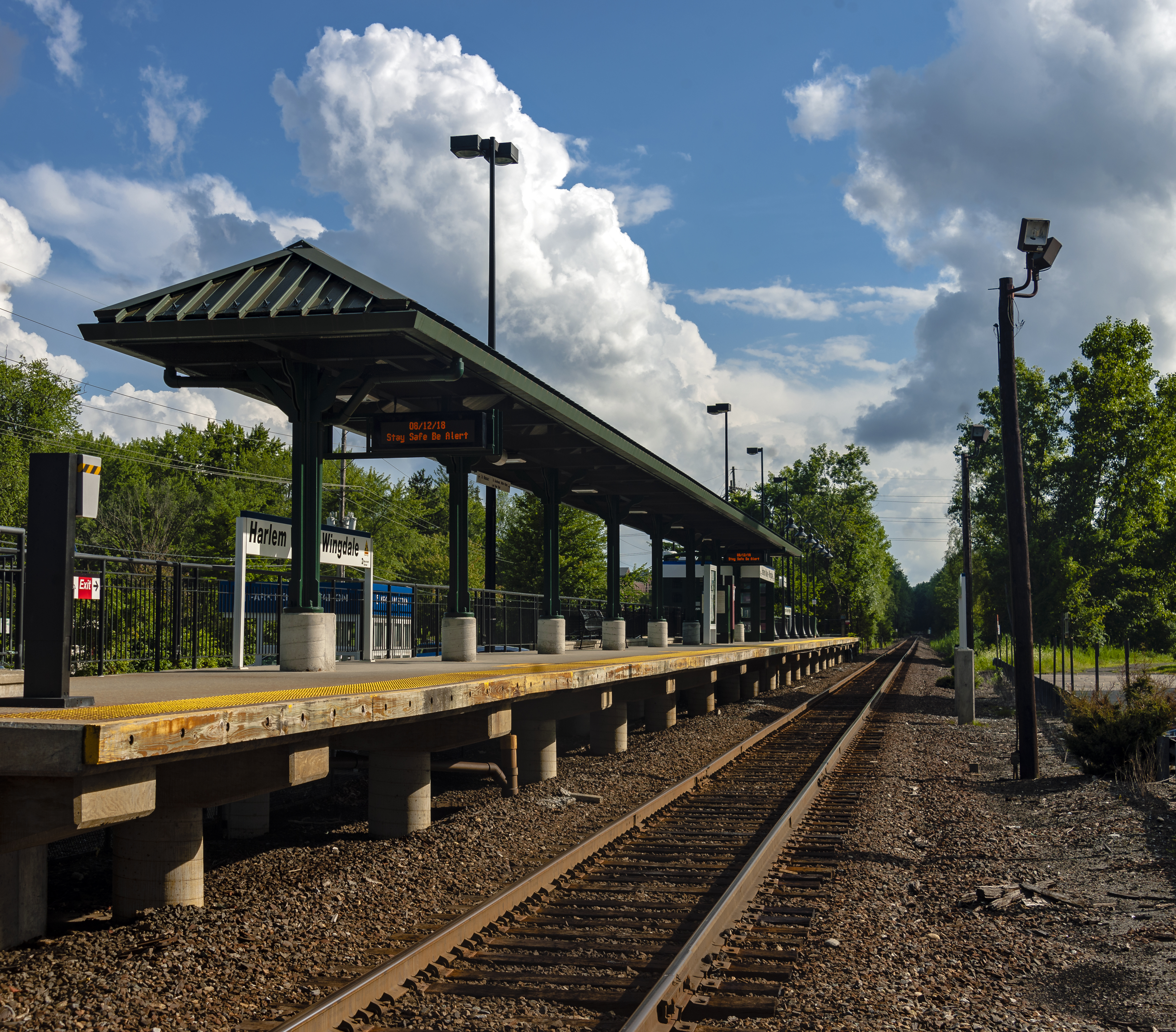
Harlem Valley-Wingdale station, along Harlem line

The Metro-North railroad provides a critical link to New York City for Dutchess County's commuting population. The Hudson Line and Amtrak run concurrently along the Hudson River, on the western edge of the county. The Hudson Line has stops at Breakneck Ridge, Beacon, and New Hamburg (a hamlet of the town of Poughkeepsie) before the Hudson Line terminates at Poughkeepsie. The tracks continue north of that point as Amtrak, with Poughkeepsie and Rhinecliff (a small hamlet in the Town of Rhinebeck) being stops along Amtrak's Empire Service.

The Harlem Line, on the eastern side of the county, has station stops in Pawling, along the Appalachian Trail, Wingdale, Dover Plains, and two stops in Wassaic (one along the Tenmile River and the other the namesake terminus of that line).

=== Buses ===
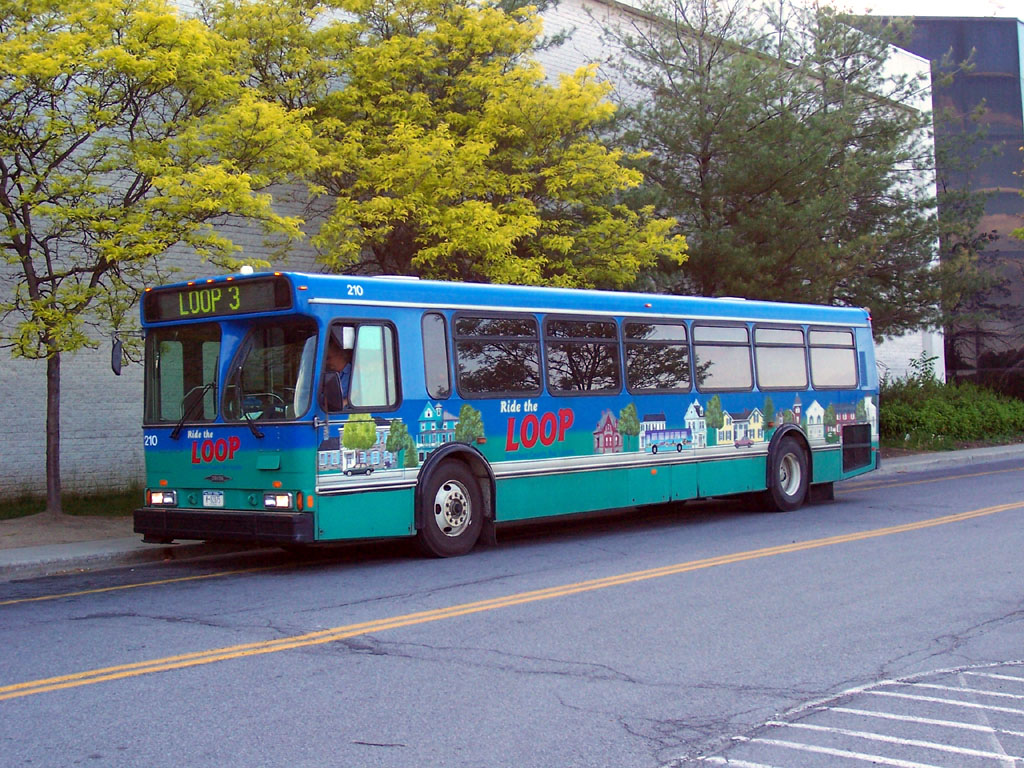
LOOP bus in Poughkeepsie

Public transportation in Dutchess County is handled by Dutchess County Public Transit, commonly called "the LOOP." Outside of the urbanized area of the county, most service is limited. Privately run lines connect Poughkeepsie to New Paltz and Beacon to Newburgh. Leprechaun Lines and Short Line Bus also operate some service through Poughkeepsie, Rhinebeck, and the southern part of the county.

=== Air ===
General aviation facilities are located at Hudson Valley Regional Airport (formerly Dutchess County Airport), located in Wappinger and Sky Park Airport in Red Hook, New York. General commercial passenger service is provided by New York Stewart International Airport, which is located across the Hudson River in Newburgh.

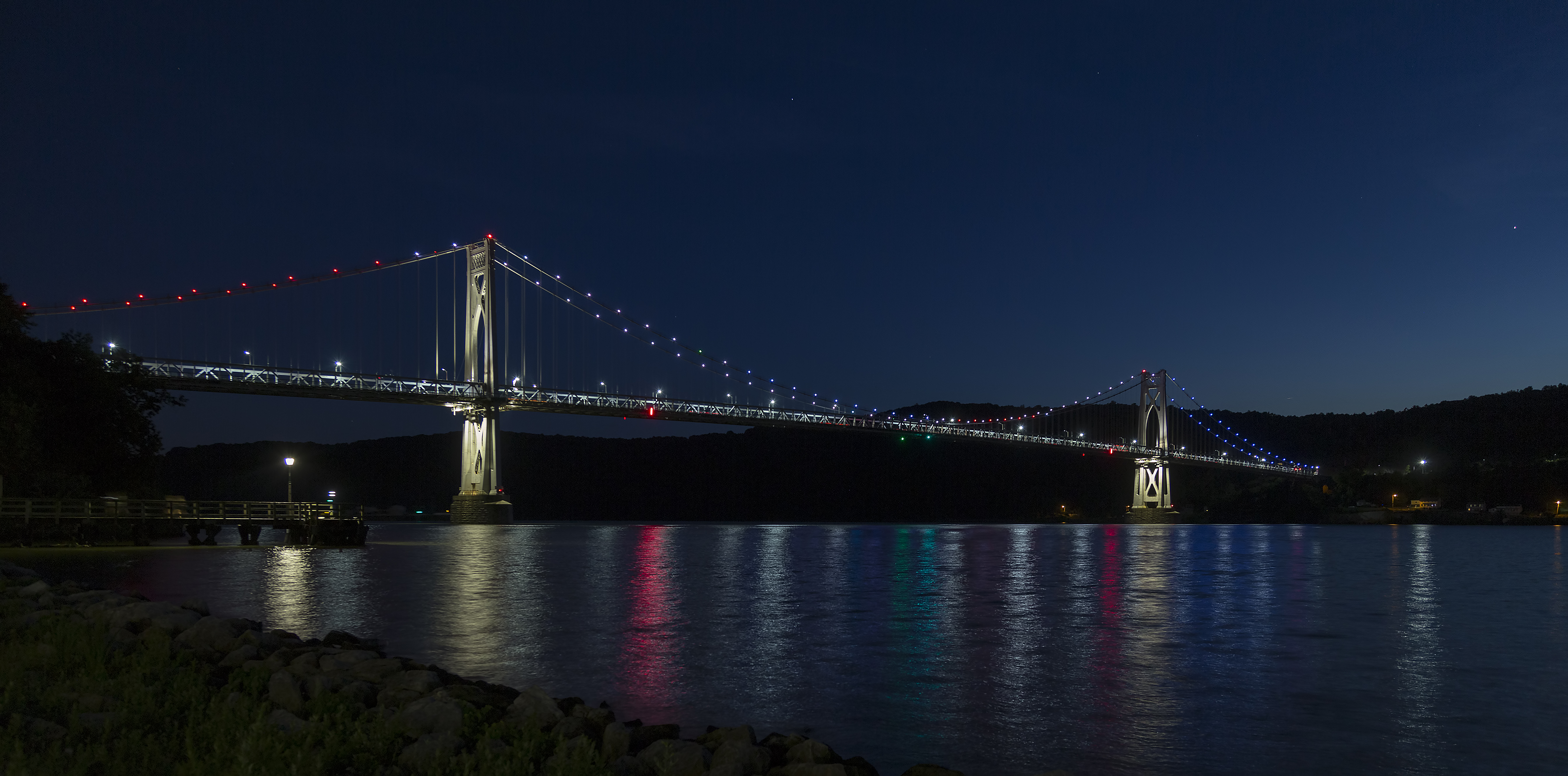
The Mid-Hudson Bridge, a major bridge in Poughkeepsie

== Culture ==
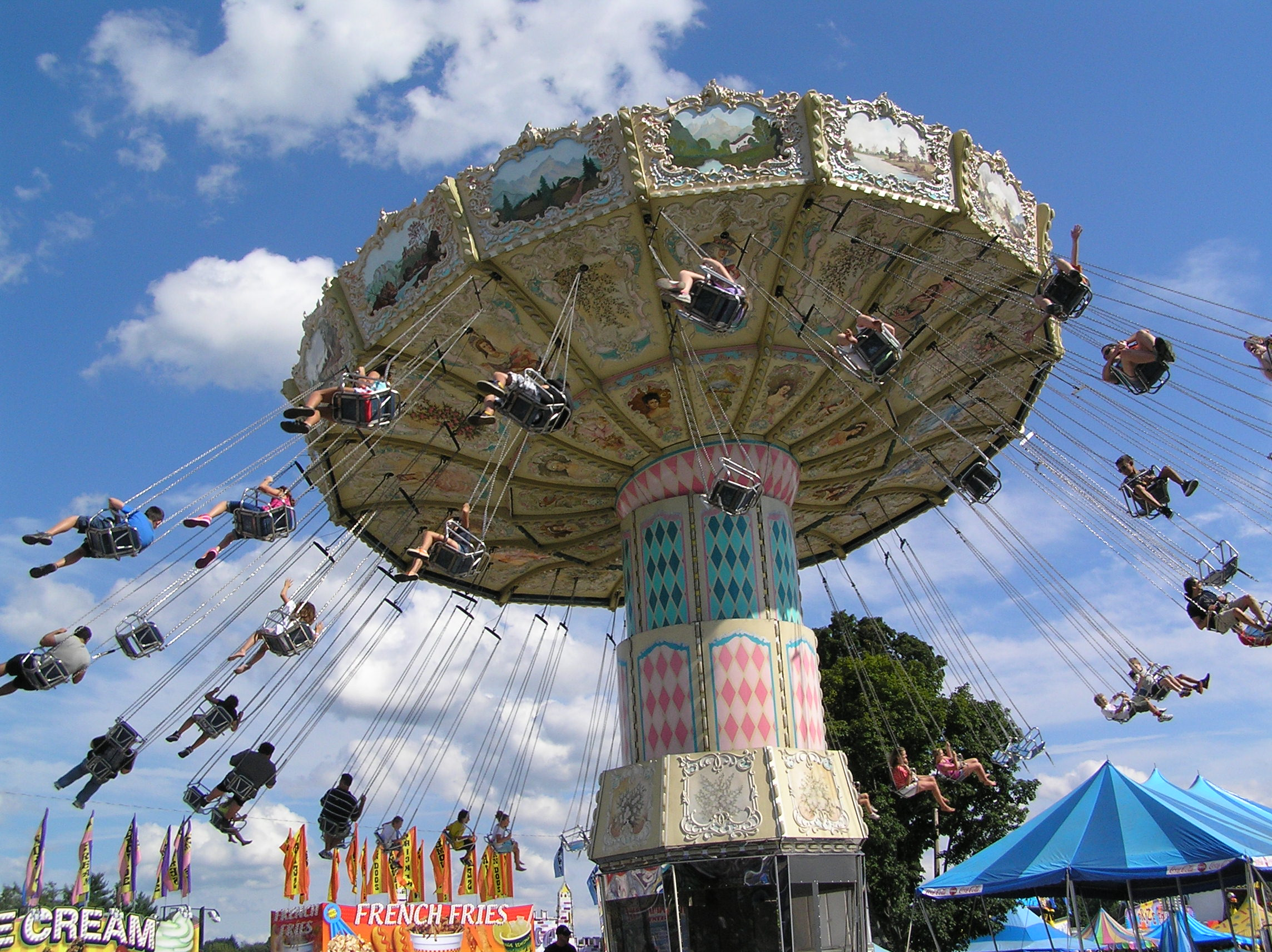
The Dutchess County Fair is an annual event

Dutchess County holds an annual county fair. The County Chamber of Commerce holds an annual hot air balloon launch typically in the first week of July. The main launch sites are along the Hudson River. As many as 20 balloons participate in the event.

The Dutchess County Historical Society was formed in 1914 and is active in the preservation of a large collection at the 18th century Clinton House. The Society has published a yearbook since 1914 and presents up to four awards of merit in the field of Dutchess County history each year.

=== Media ===
Dutchess County has no locally based television stations. (However, it does have a translator for the Capitol District PBS affiliate, WMHT.) Its only news radio format station is WKIP (AM) of Poughkeepsie. WRHV is an NPR affiliated broadcasting out of Poughkeepsie. The country music format station, WRWB-FM, broadcasting across the Hudson River, can be reached in much of the county.

Poughkeepsie Journal is published in that city. Vassar Miscellany News, associated with Vassar College, is published weekly. Also published in the county is the Beacon Free Press/Southern Dutchess News.

== Health ==
The county is home to four hospitals. Northern Dutchess Hospital in Rhinebeck and Vassar Brothers Medical Center in Poughkeepsie are both owned by Nuvance Health. In addition, MidHudson Regional Hospital (formerly St. Francis) is located in Poughkeepsie and The Castle Point Veterans Health Administration is in Wappinger.

On March 11, 2020, the county's first case of COVID-19 was confirmed. As of June 2021, there had been 29,483 cases and 445 deaths.

== Sports ==
The Hudson Valley Renegades are a minor league baseball team affiliated with the New York Yankees. The team is a member of the South Atlantic League, plays at Dutchess Stadium in Fishkill and has been located in Dutchess County since 1994.

Previous professional sports teams include the Hudson Valley Bears (2008-2009) which played hockey, and the Hudson Valley Hawks which played in the former National Professional Basketball League.

== See also ==
- List of counties in New York
- National Register of Historic Places listings in Dutchess County, New York
- Hudson Valley
