= Sky Park Airport =

- IATA: none; ICAO: none; FAA LID: 46N

Summary
- Airport type: Public use
- Owner: Avi Wolbe
- Serves: Red Hook, New York
- Elevation AMSL: 323 ft / 98 m
- Coordinates: 41°59′05″N 073°50′09″W

Map
- Location of airport in New York 46N (the United States)

Runways
Direction	Length		Surface
Direction	ft	m	Surface
1/19	2,664	812	Asphalt

Statistics (2005)
- Aircraft operations: 235
- Source: Federal Aviation Administration

Sky Park Airport (FAA LID: 46N) was a privately owned, public use airport located two nautical miles (4 km) east of Red Hook, a village in Town of Red Hook, Dutchess County, New York, United States. It is included in the National Plan of Integrated Airport Systems for 2011–2015, which categorized it as a general aviation facility.

== Facilities and aircraft ==
Sky Park Airport resides at elevation of 323 feet (98 m) above mean sea level. It has one runway designated 1/19 with an asphalt surface measuring 2,664 by 30 feet (812 x 9 m). For the 12-month period ending September 9, 2005, the airport had 235 aircraft operations: 85% general aviation, 11% air taxi and 4% military.
