= Lewis Combs =

American admiral

- Born: April 7, 1895; Manchester Center, Vermont, U.S.
- Died: May 20, 1996 (aged 101); Red Hook, New York, U.S.
- Alma mater: Rensselaer Polytechnic Institute
- Spouse: Laura B. Warren (died 1996)
- Military career
- Allegiance: United States
- Branch: United States Navy
- Rank: Admiral

Lewis Barton Combs (April 7, 1895 in Manchester Center, Vermont – May 20, 1996 in Red Hook, New York) was a United States Navy admiral who helped found and direct the famed "Seabees" construction battalions in World War II.

Born in 1895 to Louis D. and Stella Burgess Combs, at age 10 he became a golf caddy at the local course in Manchester, Vermont. On occasion he caddied for Robert Todd Lincoln, son of the 16th president. His family moved to Rensselaer, New York in 1907, where he attended the prestigious Rensselaer Polytechnic Institute (class of 1916), having earned a bachelor's degree in civil engineering. He went to work as a maintenance engineer for the New York Central Railroad.

== Navy career ==
=== World War I ===
Following his graduation from RPI in 1916, he was commissioned a lieutenant junior grade in the Navy Civil Engineering Corps shortly after the United States entered World War I. In February 1918, he reported as the Civil Engineering Officer in charge of field construction at the Navy Yard in Washington, D.C., for one year. He then reported to the Republic of Haiti to serve as the Treaty Engineer. In this billet, he served as Assistant to the Engineer Chief, and Director of Highways and Bridges, Harbor Development and Lighthouse Service.

=== Inter War ===
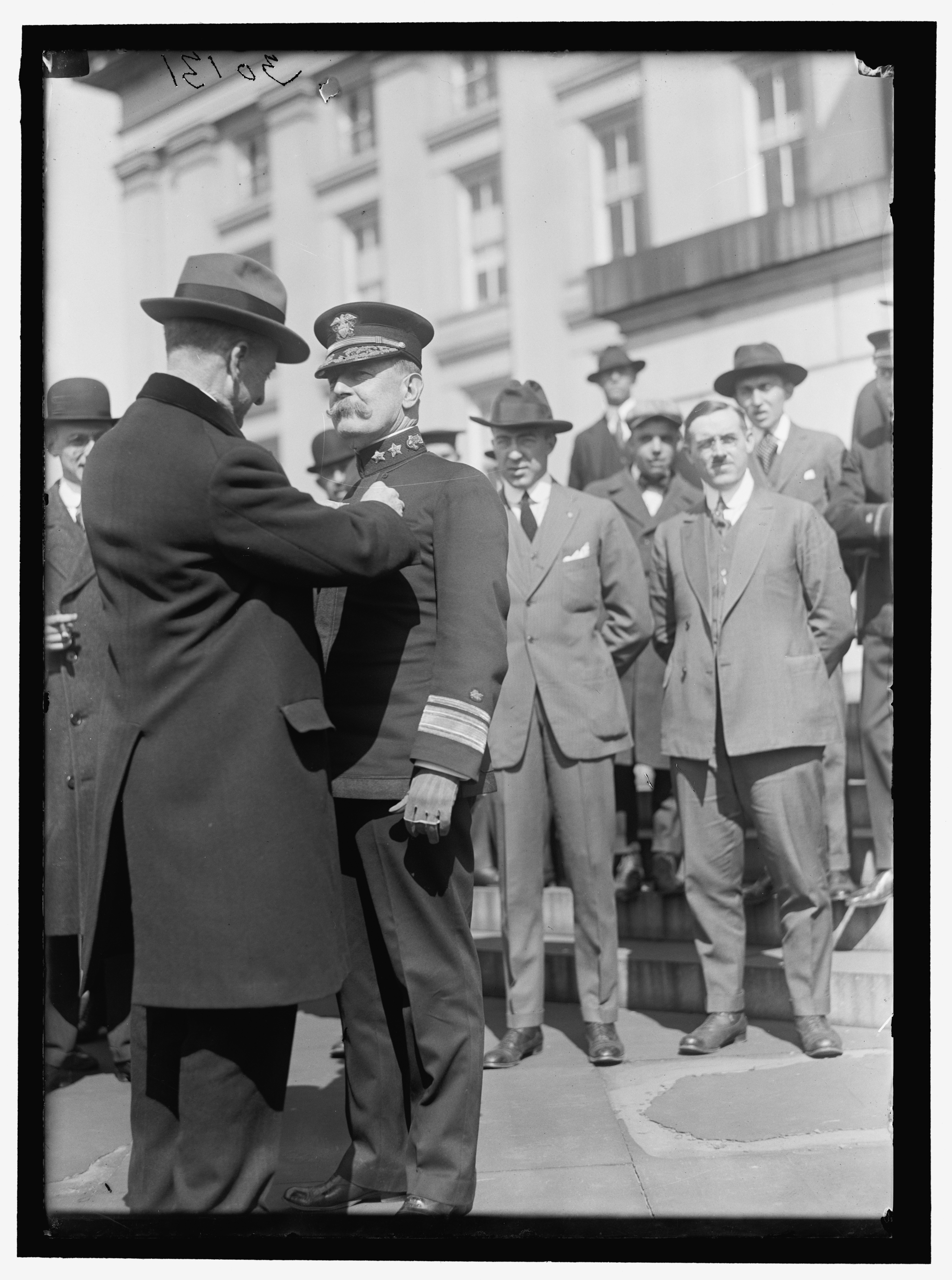
Admiral Combs receiving medal.

Combs returned to the United States in June 1924 and was assigned to the Navy Yard, New York. Additionally, he served four years in the Navy Yard, Portsmouth, New Hampshire beginning in 1925. He would go on to serve as Senior Assistant to the Public Works Officer and Executive Officer for the Eleventh Naval District, San Diego, California. He remained there until January 1932, when he became Public Works Officer with the ninth Naval District. Ordered to the Philippine Islands, he served from May 1935, through April 1937, as Public Works Officer, Sixteenth Naval District, at the Navy Yard, Cavite. In May 1937, then Commander Combs, reported to the Navy Bureau of Yards and Docks as Officer in Charge of Construction at the Navy Experimental Model Basin, Carderock, Maryland.

=== World War II ===
In January 1938, at the age of 42, Commander Combs was appointed Assistant (Deputy) Chief of the Bureau of Yards and Docks, under Admiral Ben Moreell. In this billet he presided over the expansion of the Navy Civil Engineering Corps from a small group of 120 Officers and about 300 civilian engineers, to a wartime peak of over 10,000. Additionally, he oversaw the massive expansion of naval shore bases necessary to support the “Two Ocean Navy”. Combs directed the creation of the Navy’s Construction Battalions, also known as the Seabees. He served as Deputy Chief of Civil Engineers, from 1938 through 1946. During this time, Combs served as a technical adviser during the making of the film The Fighting Seabees starring John Wayne. Combs retired from the Navy in 1945 at the conclusion of World War II.

== Later years ==
After his retirement from the Navy in 1947 he spent 15 years as head of the civil-engineering department at his alma mater, Rensselaer Polytechnic Institute.

== Personal life ==
Combs' wife of 71 years, the former Laura B. Warren, died two months before her husband. The couple left no immediate survivors.
