= Upper Red Hook, New York =

- Census-designated place
- Location within New York Location within the United States
- Coordinates: 42°1′47″N 73°50′41″W
- Country: United States
- State: New York
- County: Dutchess
- Town: Red Hook

Area
  - Total: 0.20 sq mi (0.52 km^{2})
  - Land: 0.20 sq mi (0.52 km^{2})
  - Water: 0 sq mi (0.00 km^{2})
- Elevation: 229 ft (70 m)

Population (2020)
  - Total: 180
  - Density: 899.4/sq mi (347.27/km^{2})
- Time zone: UTC-5 (Eastern (EST))
  - Summer (DST): UTC-4 (EDT)
- ZIP Code: 12571 (Red Hook)
- Area code: 845
- FIPS code: 36-76397
- GNIS feature ID: 2806932

Upper Red Hook is a hamlet and census-designated place (CDP) in the town of Red Hook in Dutchess County, New York, United States. It was first listed as a CDP prior to the 2020 census. As of the 2020 census, Upper Red Hook had a population of 180.

The community is in northwestern Dutchess County, in the northeastern part of the town of Red Hook. U.S. Route 9 passes through the CDP, leading north 18 miles (29 km) to Hudson and southwest through Red Hook village 8 miles (13 km) to Rhinebeck.

== Demographics ==
Historical population
| Census | Pop. | Note | %± |
|---|---|---|---|
| 2020 | 180 | | — |
U.S. Decennial Census
