= Jon Dalzell =

American-Israeli basketball player

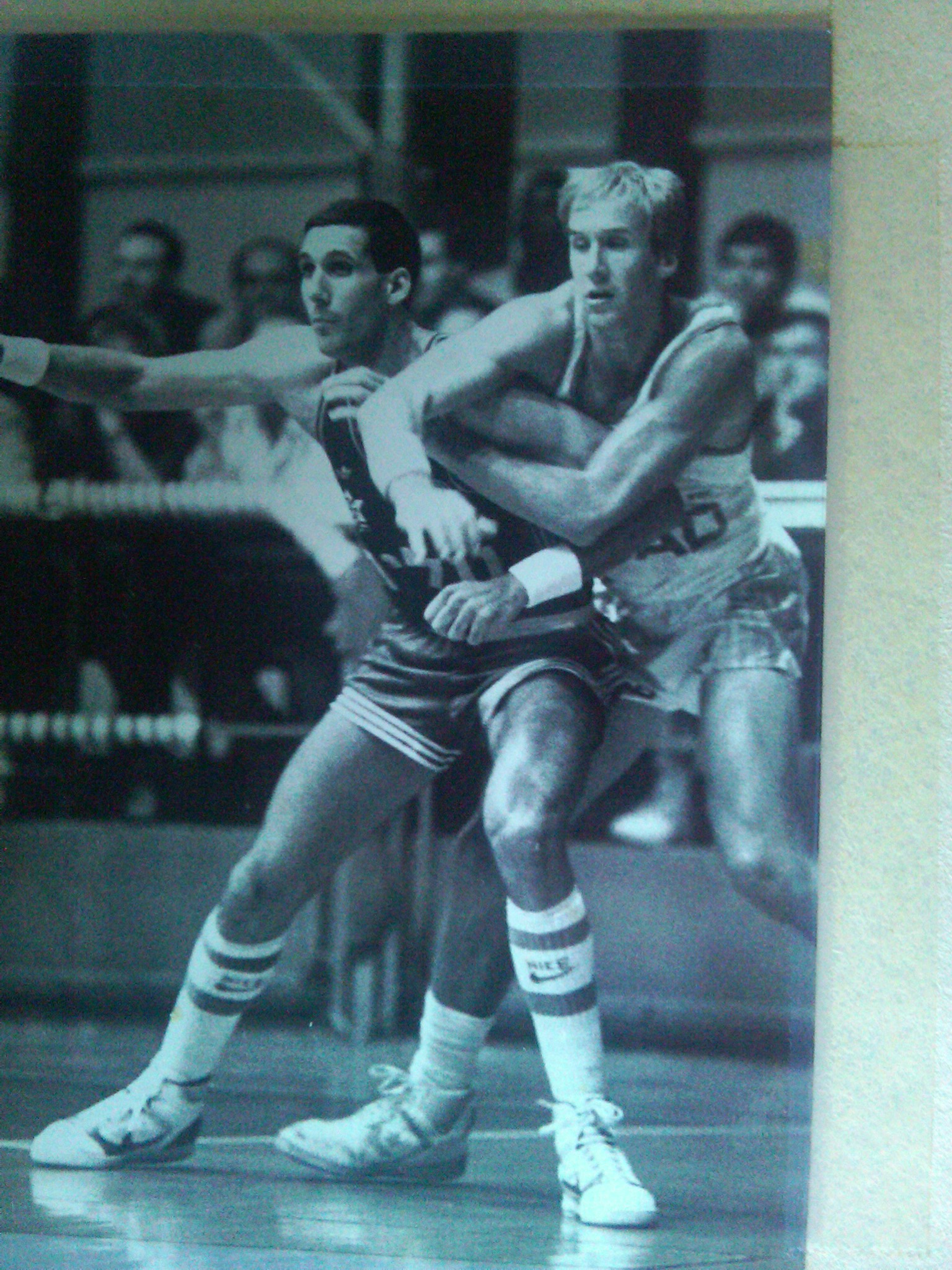

Personal information
- Born: July 8, 1960 (age 66) Yonkers, New York
- Listed height: 6 ft 3 in (1.91 m)
- Listed weight: 190 lb (86 kg)

Career information
- High school: Red Hook (Red Hook, New York)
- College: Eastern New Mexico (1978–1982)
- NBA draft: 1982: undrafted
- Position: Shooting guard
- Number: 7

Jon Dalzell (Hebrew: ג'ון דלזל; born July 8, 1960) is an American-Israeli former basketball player. He played the shooting guard position. Dalzell played in the Israeli Basketball Premier League for 14 seasons from 1983 to 1997.

== Biography ==
Dalzell grew up in Red Hook, New York. He is 6 ft 4 in (193 cm) tall.

He attended Red Hook High School in Red Hook, New York, playing basketball for the Red Hook Raiders in the Ulster County Athletic League. Dalzell was top scorer averaging 24.7 points per game in 1978, named 1978 High School Player of the Year in the Tri-County Area, and led his team to league championships in 1977 and 1978.

Dalzell then attended Eastern New Mexico University ('82). He played basketball for the Eastern New Mexico Greyhounds in 1978–82, in his senior year averaged 15.8 points per game, and was named All Conference. In 1982 Dalzell participated at the rookie camp for the San Antonio Spurs.

Dalzell played in the Israeli Basketball Premier League for 14 seasons from 1983 to 1997. He played for Hapoel Jerusalem, Hapoel Tel Aviv, Hapoel Holon, Hapoel Gvat, and Hapoel Haifa. His career highs in the Israeli Basketball Premier League were 42 points in a game in the 1985–86 season, including 11–3 pointers and eight assists in a game in the 1992–93 season. He won the Israeli Basketball State Cup with Jerusalem in 1996 and in 1997. He was # 3 all-time in 3-point shooting in Israeli history, and in 2008 was inducted into the Israeli Basketball Hall of Fame.

He later earned a coaching basketball degree from Wingate Institute in Israel. He also coached both women and men's AAU basketball teams for ASA Hoops. In 1992 to 1999 Dalzell coached the Israeli Air Force basketball team.

Today, Jon is the general manager of a moving company, Isaacs Moving and Storage, which is located in Stoughton, Massachusetts. At age 63, he still plays in several leagues and most recently averages 30 points per game at in a recreational basketball league.
