= Red Hook, New York =

- Town
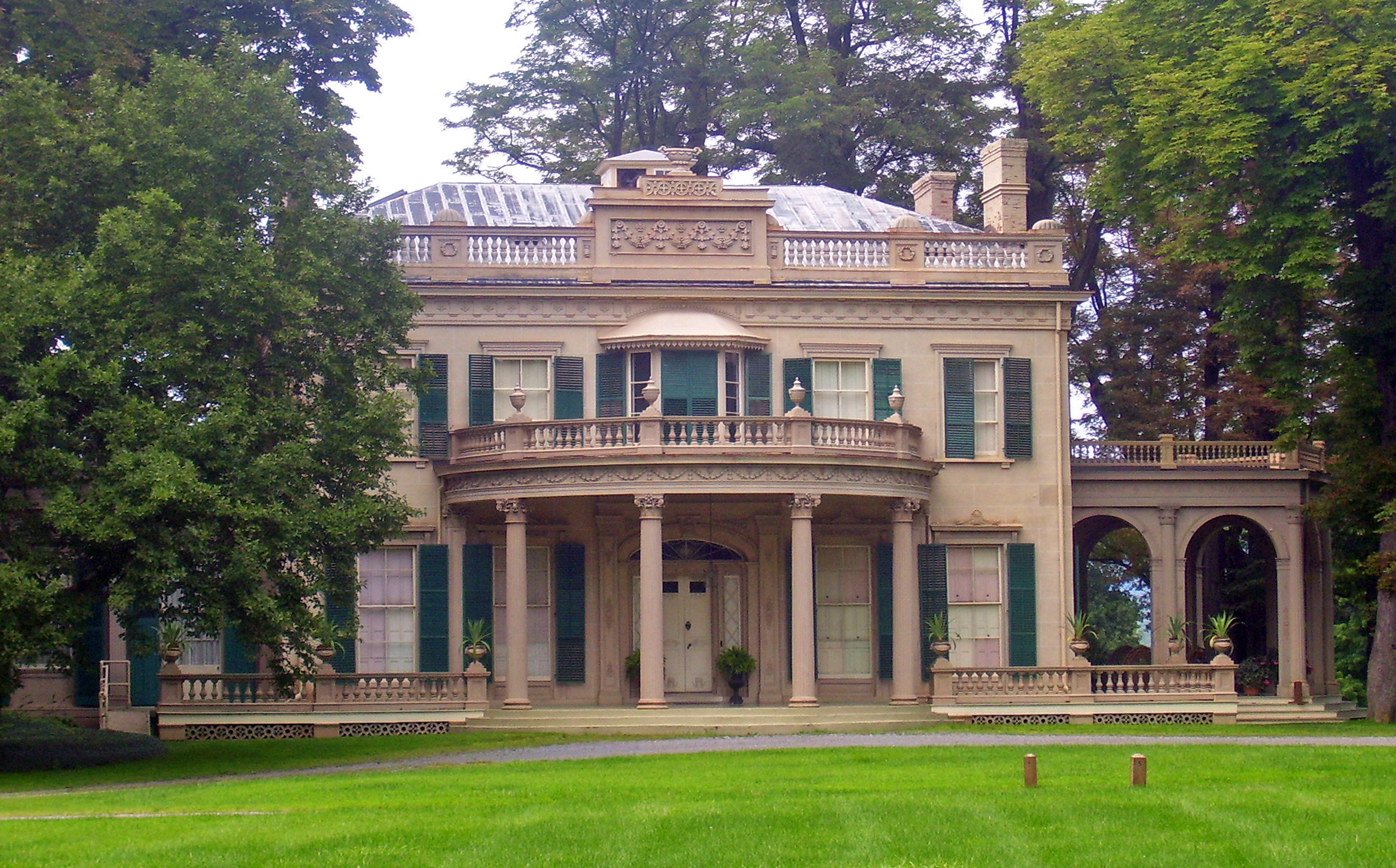
- Montgomery Place in Barrytown

- Flag Seal

- Location of Red Hook in Dutchess County, New York (left) and of Dutchess County in New York state (right)
- Coordinates: 42°0′46″N 73°53′15″W
- Country: United States
- State: New York
- County: Dutchess
- Established: 1812

Government
  - Type: Town Council
  - Town Supervisor: Robert McKeon (D)
  - Town Council: Members' List: • Harry Colgan (D); • Christine Kane (D); • Sarah Imboden (D); • Bill O'Neill (D)

Area
  - Total: 40.04 sq mi (103.70 km^{2})
  - Land: 36.17 sq mi (93.68 km^{2})
  - Water: 3.87 sq mi (10.03 km^{2})
- Elevation: 203 ft (62 m)

Population (2020)
  - Total: 9,953
  - Density: 248.6/sq mi (95.97/km^{2})
- Time zone: UTC−5 (Eastern (EST))
  - Summer (DST): UTC−4 (EDT)
- ZIP Codes: 12571 (Red Hook); 12504 (Annandale On Hudson); 12507 (Barrytown); 12583 (Tivoli); 12572 (Rhinebeck)
- Area code: 845
- FIPS code: 36-027-60905
- GNIS feature ID: 0979411
- Website: www.redhookny.gov

Red Hook is a town in Dutchess County, New York, United States. The population was 9,953 at the time of the 2020 census, down from 11,319 in 2010. The name is supposedly derived from the red foliage on trees on a small strip of land on the Hudson River. The town contains two villages, Red Hook and Tivoli. The town is in the northwest part of Dutchess County.

The town also contains two hamlets. Bard College is in the hamlet of Annandale-on-Hudson. The Unification Theological Seminary is in the hamlet of Barrytown. Both hamlets are located within the Hudson River Historic District.

== History ==
The original inhabitants of this land were the Mohican, Munsee and Lenape people. During European settlement, Native American tribes played a fundamental role in the area's economy as they traded beaver skin with European settlers. European settlers imported several foreign goods, such as cattle, horses, and sheep. Enslaved African American individuals were also brought. Through importing non-native species, the landscape and ecology of this region has been dramatically changed.

European settler-colonial understandings of land-ownership are different from the perspectives of Mohican, Munsee and Lenape land use, a difference not often reflected in the land deeds that establish European presence on this land.

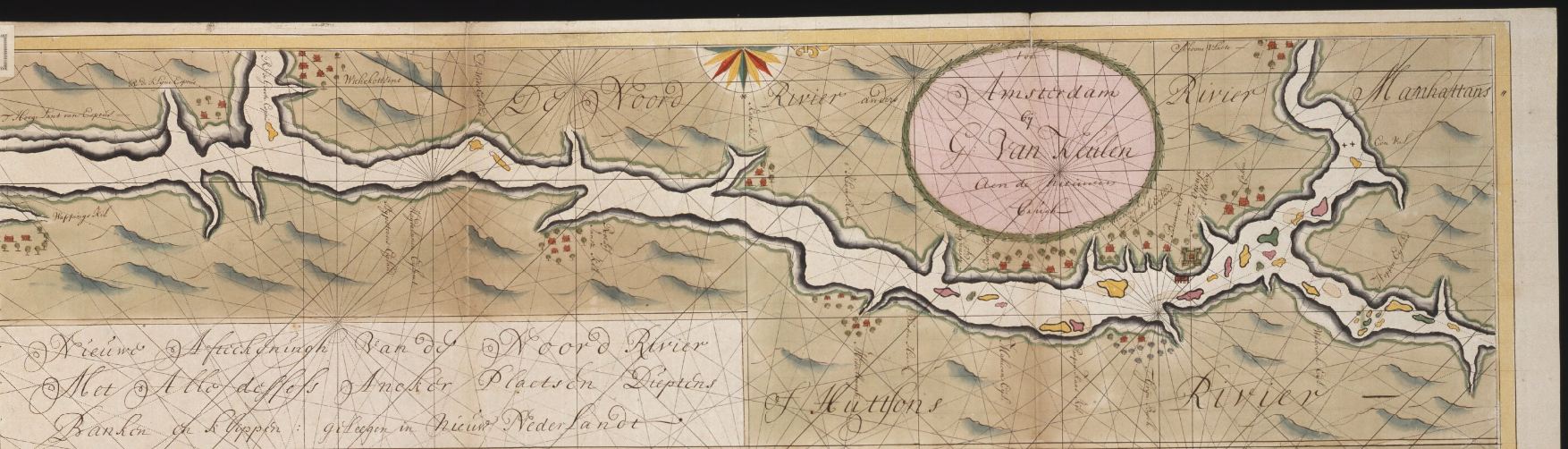
A map of the Mid and Upper Hudson Valley by Gerard Van Keulen published in 1720, includes Magdalen island in present-day Red Hook, which was often used as a waypoint for navigation. The text reads in English "New definition of the North River with all its anchor sites, depths, banks and cliffs: located in the New Netherlands"

The Lenape believed that Kishelëmukòng had created the earth for all people and creatures, meaning that land could not be appropriated by any individual or despoiled for personal profit. In this way, this group of people did not understand the process of selling land but believed they would receive continued access to it to hunt, fish, forage, or even plant crops. Through Schuyler's Patent, Dutch settler Peter Schuyler acquired two tracts of land from unidentified native peoples, “one near Red Hook and one south of Poughkeepsie” in 1688. One of the three place-names identified in Schuyler's Patent is given in the Munsee language.

Prior to 1812, Red Hook was part of the town of Rhinebeck. Because Rhinebeck, as well other towns, had populations over 5,000 residents, the state legislature authorized the separation of these two precincts on June 12 to accommodate and encourage public attendance at town meetings via horseback or carriage. The first documented Town of Red Hook meeting was on April 6, 1813, in a local inn and held yearly afterwards as required by law. Wealthy landowning farmers oversaw the maintenance of their assigned roads with the help of their farm workers and neighbors. The Red Hook Society for the Apprehension and Detention of Horse Thieves is thought to be one of the oldest formal organizations in the state and still holds an annual meeting.

== Geography ==
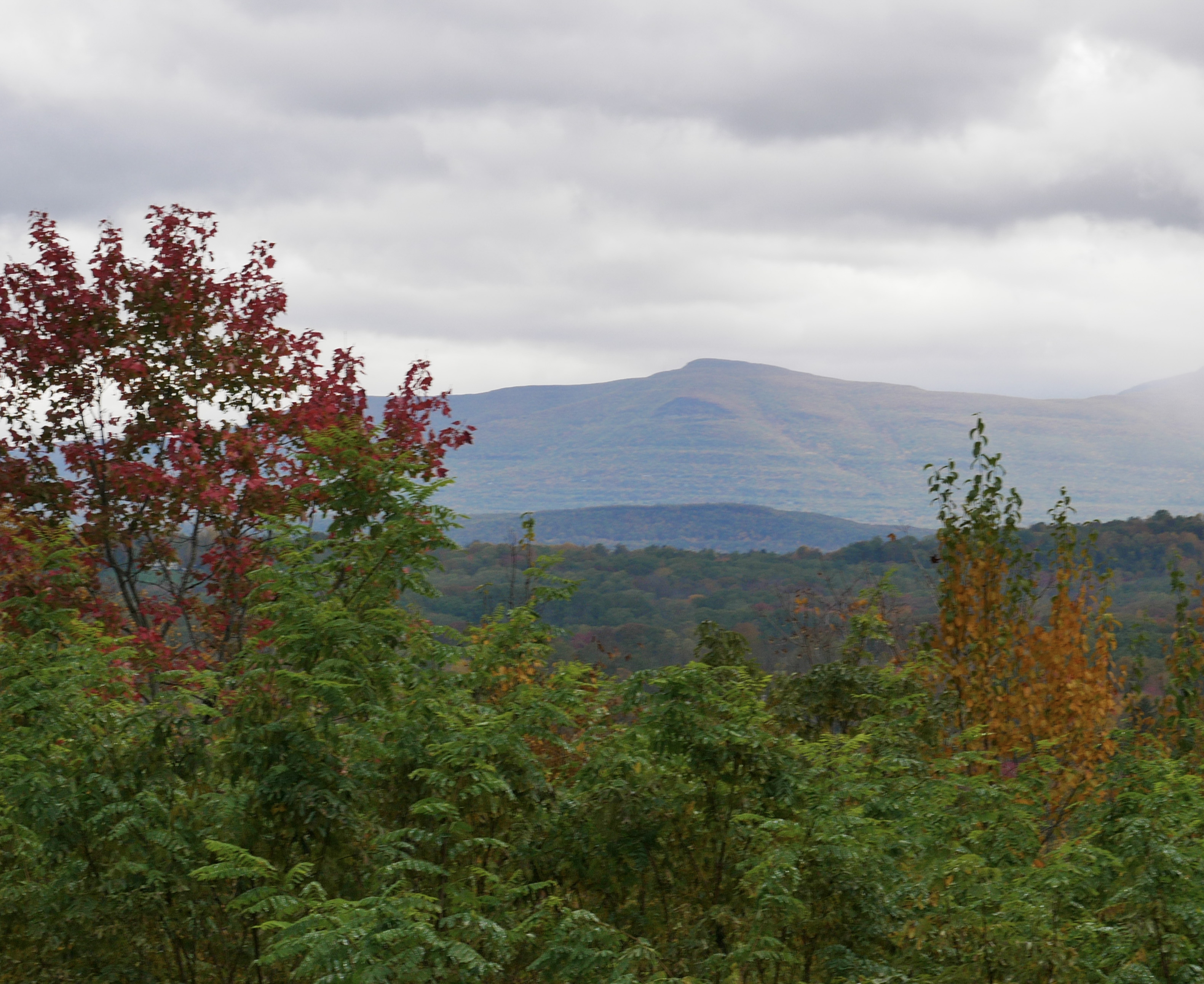
A view of Overlook Mountain from Upper Red Hook

Prior to European settlement, the land surrounding the Mahicannituck, or the Hudson River, included “forested hills, meadows, and tributary streams”. This landscape of the river, as well as the surrounding land, was often portrayed in a romanticized, naturalized fashion to depict an American “wilderness” that was devoid of Indigenous presence to further narratives of European exploration of the Americas. This same landscape was described in small detail in Hendrick Aupaumut's written account of the Native history of the Mohicans in 1791, showing that Native people enjoyed this same landscape prior to these settlers’ arrival. Upon their arrival, settlers changed this landscape through the building of grist mills, sawmills, a carding machine, a trip hammer, and a distillery in 1797. Other more contemporary examples of the change in the geography of the town of Red Hook include the development of Tivoli North Bay and Stony Creek watershed as well as the Tivoli South Bay and the Saw Kill watershed. European settlement did not always cause environmental change but it may or may not have altered the rate at which environmental change naturally occurs.

The Stockbridge-Munsee Band of Mohicans have identified Dutchess County, which includes Red Hook, as an area of archeological interest.

According to the United States Census Bureau, the town currently has a total area of 40.0 square miles (103.7 km^{2}), of which 36.2 square miles (93.7 km^{2}) is land and 3.9 square miles (10.0 km^{2}), or 9.67%, is water. The northern town line is the border of Columbia County. The western town boundary is the border of Ulster County and is delineated by the center of the Hudson River.

== Education ==
The town of Red Hook has its own school district (which also includes part of the neighboring towns of Milan and Livingston). Grades pre-kindergarten to five attend the Mill Road Elementary School, grades 6–8 attend the Linden Avenue Middle School, and grades 9–12 attend the Red Hook High School. Over 80% of its graduates go on to two and four-year colleges.

School	Grades
Mill Road Elementary School	K to 5th
Linden Avenue Middle School	6th to 8th
Red Hook High School	9th to 12th

Bard College (née St. Stephen's College), established, 1860, is a private college in the hamlet of Annandale-on-Hudson with undergraduate and graduate programs; Simon's Rock at Bard College is located in nearby Barrytown.

== Culture ==
Bard College has various components that are open to the general public.

- Bard Conservatory of Music, events at Fisher Center for the Performing Arts.
- Hannah Arendt Center for Politics and Humanities.
- Hessel Museum of Art at Bard College.

The Old Rhinebeck Aerodrome, a living museum of aircraft, is in the southeast part of the town.

Poets' Walk Park is to the southwestern part of Red Hook. Created by landscape architect Hugo Jacob Ehlers, it is managed by the Scenic Hudson Land Trust and on its western side it overlooks the Hudson River.

== Demographics (2010) ==
Historical population
Census	Pop.	Note	%±
1820	2,714		—
1830	2,983		9.9%
1840	2,829		−5.2%
1850	3,264		15.4%
1860	3,964		21.4%
1870	4,350		9.7%
1880	4,471		2.8%
1890	4,388		−1.9%
1900	3,895		−11.2%
1910	3,705		−4.9%
1920	3,218		−13.1%
1930	3,404		5.8%
1940	3,405		0.0%
1950	4,219		23.9%
1960	6,023		42.8%
1970	7,548		25.3%
1980	8,351		10.6%
1990	9,565		14.5%
2000	10,408		8.8%
2010	11,319		8.8%
2020	9,953		−12.1%
U.S. Decennial Census

As of the census of 2010, there were 11,149 people, 3,851 households, and 2,473 families residing in the town. The population density was 283.6 inhabitants per square mile (109.5/km^{2}). There were 3,851 housing units at an average density of 104.6 per square mile (40.4/km^{2}). The racial makeup of the town was 90.1% white, 1.44% African American, .50% Native American, 3.3% Asian, 0% Pacific Islander, .65% from other races, and 1.6% from two or more races. Hispanic or Latino of any race were 6.7% of the population.

There were 3,851 households. 18.4% were children under the age of 18, 56.5% were married couples living together, 9.3% had a female householder with no husband present, and 30.8% were non-families. Of all households 23.4% were made up of individuals, and 9.1% had someone living alone who was 65 years of age or older. The average household size was 2.63 and the average family size was 3.14.

In the town, the population was spread out, with 18.4% under the age of 18, 15.0% from 18 to 24, 25.8% from 25 to 44, 22.6% from 45 to 64, and 16.0% who were 65 years of age or older. The median age was 36 years. For every 100 females, there were 94.5 males. For every 100 females age 18 and over, there were 89 males. The percentage of female persons was 51.3%.

The median income for a household in the town was $46,701, and the median income for a family was $57,950. Males had a median income of $42,099 versus $26,694 for females. The per capita income for the town was $20,410. About 5.0% of families and 8.7% of the population were below the poverty line, including 7.8% of those under age 18 and 5.2% of those age 65 or over.

== Communities and locations in the town of Red Hook ==
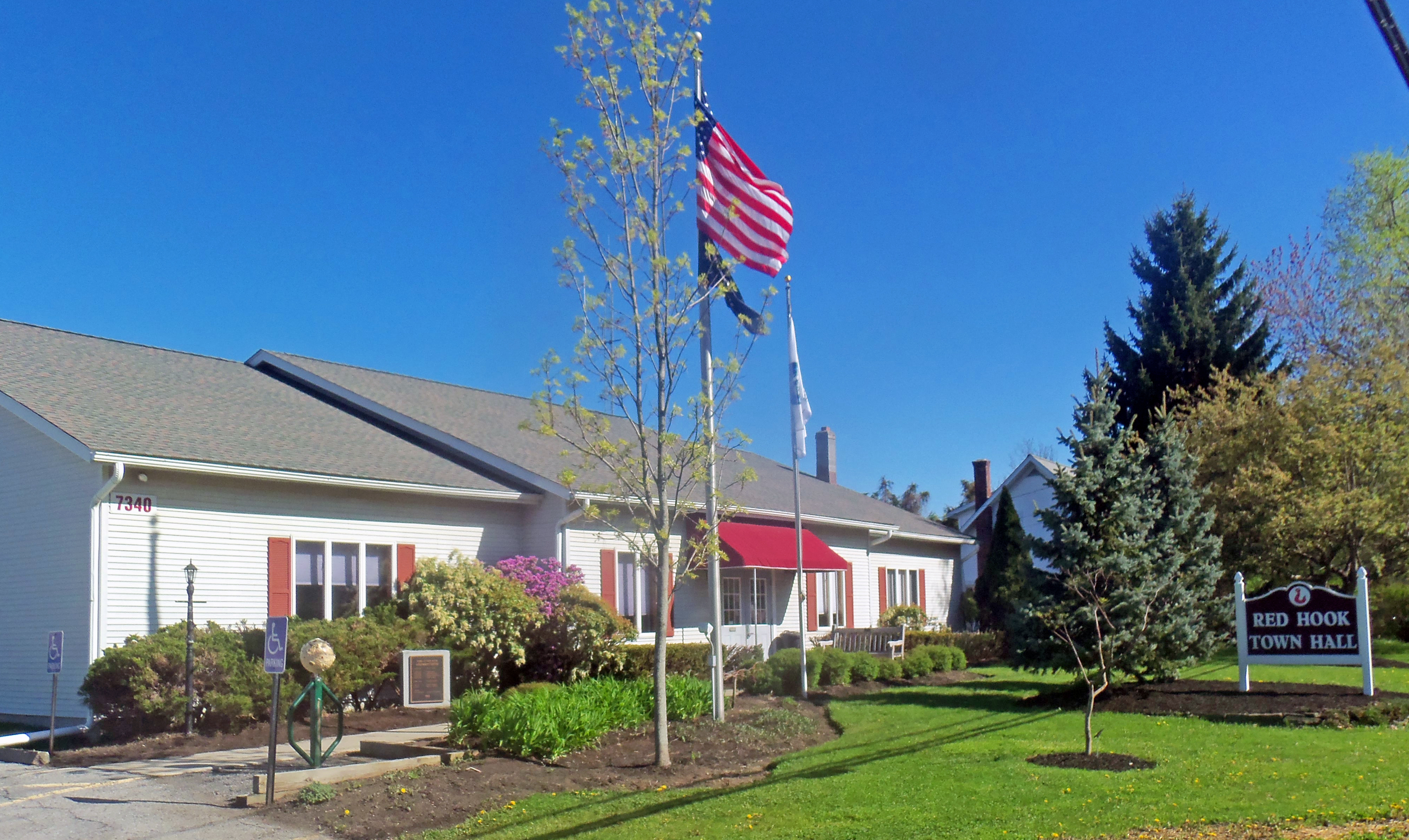
Town hall

- Annandale-on-Hudson: a hamlet in the northwest part of the town by the Hudson River. Because this community does not have a well-developed business district, students of Bard College often use the villages of Tivoli and downtown Red Hook as "college towns".
- Bard College: a college located in the northwestern part of the town, which was listed as a CDP in 2020.
- Barrytown: a hamlet south of Annandale-on-Hudson. The north junction of NY 9G and NY 199 is known as Barrytown Corners.
- Cokertown: a hamlet in the northeastern part of the town, located along County Route 56.
- College Park: a housing development east of Bard College.
- Forest Park: a housing development in the southern section of the town.
- Fraleighs: a hamlet in the eastern part of the town.
- Kerleys Corners: a hamlet near the north town line at the junction of US 9 and County Route 78.
- Linden Acres: a housing development northwest of Red Hook village.
- Red Hook, the village.
- Red Hook Mills: a hamlet north of Red Hook village.
- Spring Lakes: a small hamlet along County Route 55.
- Tivoli: this village is in the northwestern part of the town, by the Hudson River, on the western side of NY 9G.
- Upper Red Hook: a hamlet north of Red Hook village.

== Transportation ==
=== Airport ===
Sky Park Airport was a public use general aviation facility located two nautical miles (4 km) east of Red Hook's central business district (Broadway-US 9 and Market Street -NY 199). Sky Park Airport is no longer in service.

=== Roads ===
U.S Route 9 runs north–south through Red Hook. New York State Route 9G passes north–south through villages in that are adjacent to the Hudson River. New York State Route 199 runs east–west through the town, and it passes west over the Hudson River towards Kingston, New York.

=== Railroad ===
Until 1956, as many as three New York Central Railroad trains a day south-bound from Albany to New York City made stops at Barrytown's depot (in the hamlet to the Hudson River tributary, Sawkill Creek, south of Bard College). As many as four north-bound trains a day, including the Delaware & Hudson's Laurentian, made stops at Barrytown. By 1960, the depot fell from the NYC's passenger schedules as a station stop.

== Notable people ==
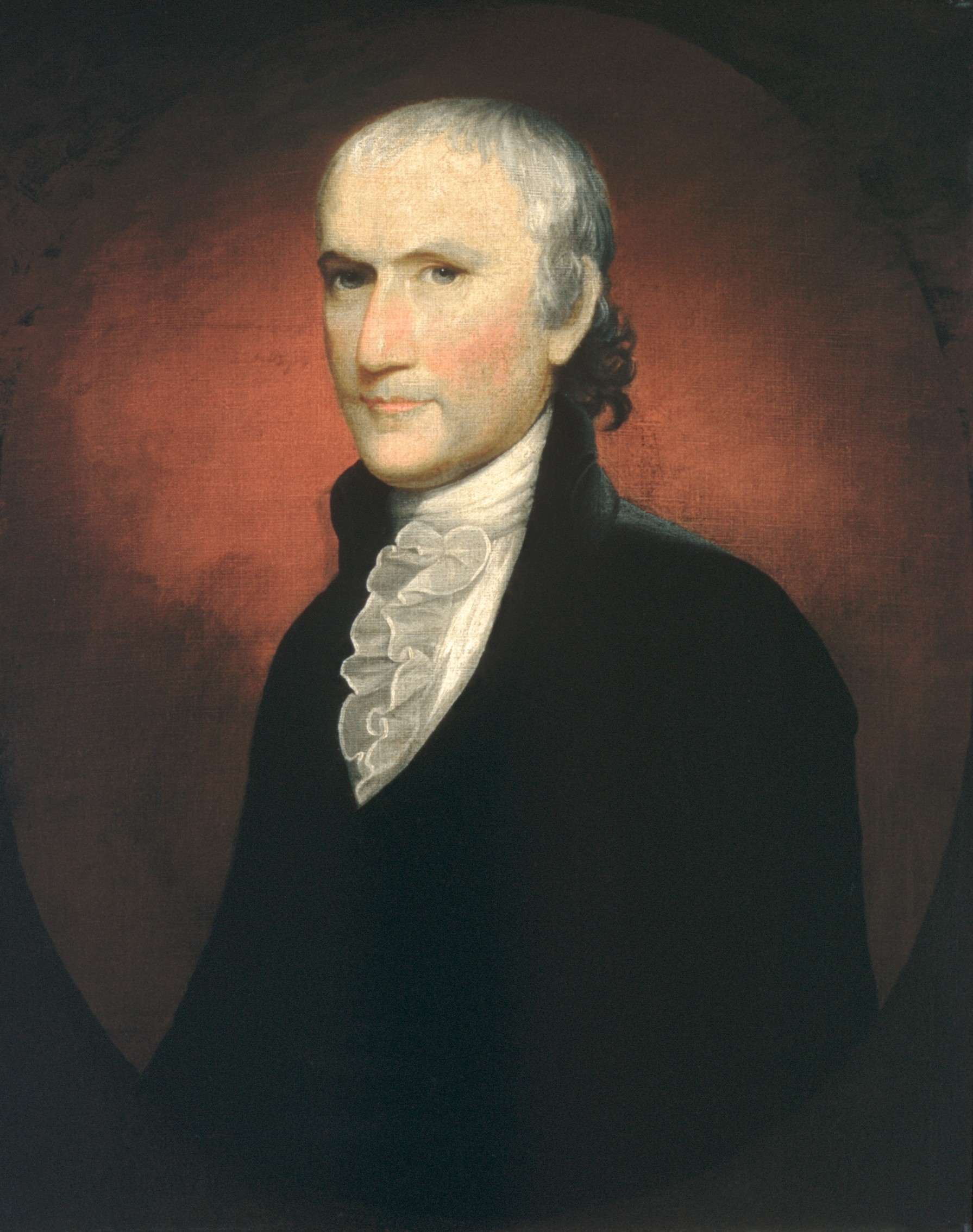
Egbert Benson

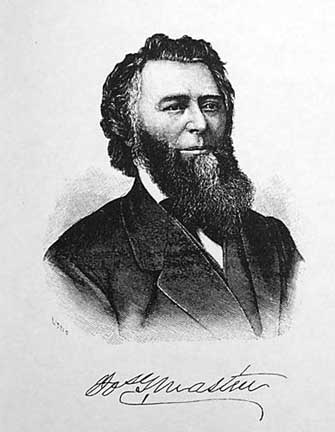
Joseph G. Masten

- Hannah Arendt, philosopher and author
- Egbert Benson, first New York Attorney General
- Lewis Combs, admiral
- Jon Dalzell, American-Israeli basketball player
- Dorothy Day, founder of the Catholic Worker Movement
- Stephen Hickman, artist
- Gary Hill, video artist
- Samantha Hunt, writer
- George E. Jonas, industrialist and founder of Camp Rising Sun, an international scholarship summer leadership program
- Robert Kelly, poet
- Alison Knowles, artist active in the Fluxus movement
- Charlotte Mandell, literary translator
- Brice Marden, noted abstract painter and printmaker
- Joseph G. Masten, mayor of Buffalo, 1843–1844 and 1845–1846
- John Morris, film and TV composer.
- Kyle Murphy, professional soccer player
- Peter Serkin, classical pianist.
- Robert Sheckley, science fiction writer
- William B. Sheldon, Wisconsin territorial legislator and lawyer
- Sheridan Shook, businessman and tax collector
- Gore Vidal, writer and public intellectual
- Andrew Deveaux, Loyalist military officer who recaptured the Bahamas for Britain in 1783 and later resided in Red Hook

== See also ==
- Poets' Walk Park
