= Poets' Walk Park =

Coordinates: 41.981910°N 73.917063°W

Poets' Walk Park is located in Red Hook, New York, United States on the River Road (just north of the Kingston-Rhinecliff Bridge, New York State Route 199). It is intended to celebrate the connection between landscape and poetry. The classic wooden vistas, sunlit fields and thick forest were the main focus of landscape architect Hans Jacob Ehlers' vision for the property in 1849.

== Description ==
The park's mown and gravel paths are variously lined with wooden benches, and provide access to the 120 acres (0.49 km^{2}) of fields and forest, as well as river views. The park's walls of foliage and stone evoke outdoor "rooms" that reflect the 1849 landscape aims of Ehlers.

The distance from the Information Arbor at the beginning of the path to the Overlook Pavilion is about half a mile, and at a leisurely pace takes the average walker about 15 minutes. The return trip is slightly uphill and a bit longer. From the pavilion to the summerhouse (via the Poets' Walk Path) is an additional 20 minutes (one way), and from the pavilion to the flagpole is also 20 minutes (one way).

== History ==
The Poets' Walk Park property was originally part of a 1688 land grant to Colonel Pieter Schuyler of Albany.

Around 1800, General John Armstrong Jr., who was married to Alida Livingston, daughter of Judge Robert Livingston (1718–1775) and Margaret (née Beekman) Livingston of Clermont, sold his farm/estate of "Almont". For the next ten years, Armstrong served first in Congress as a Senator from New York, then as Minister to France. Around 1811, he established an estate a little farther north in Barrytown. The Armstrongs called the estate La Bergerie. Here they raised Merino sheep, which had been given to Armstrong by Napoleon. In 1818, their daughter, Margaret, married William Backhouse Astor Sr. Around 1835, Astor purchased the 728-acre estate for a summer home; Margaret Astor renamed it "Rokeby".

In September 1844, their daughter, Laura Eugenia Astor, married merchant/financier Franklin Hughes Delano. As a wedding present, William Astor gave the couple the southernmost 100 acres of Rokeby. The estate became known as Steen Valetje (which means "little stone valley" in Dutch).

In 1849, the Astors and the Delanos commissioned German-born landscape gardener Hans Jacob Ehlers to improve the grounds at Rokeby and Steen Valetje, in the course of which he constructed a woodland path called the Poets' Walk in honor of Washington Irving and Fitz-Greene Halleck who are said to have strolled there.

The park has been visited by many literary figures, including William Cullen Bryant (1794–1878) and Jack Kerouac (1922-1969).

Today, the visual integrity of the park and its setting is protected by the Scenic Hudson Land Trust's conservation easements on the surrounding 800 acres (3.2 km^{2}). The park is open from 9am until dusk (6pm in winter, 8pm during summer). Scenic Hudson retained Optimus Architecture to design both the information kiosk at the trailhead and the rustic Overlook Pavilion, where visitors will find the best scenic views in the park. The project received a design award from the New York Chapter of the Society of American Registered Architects.
