= Red Hook (village), New York =

Red Hook, New York
- Village
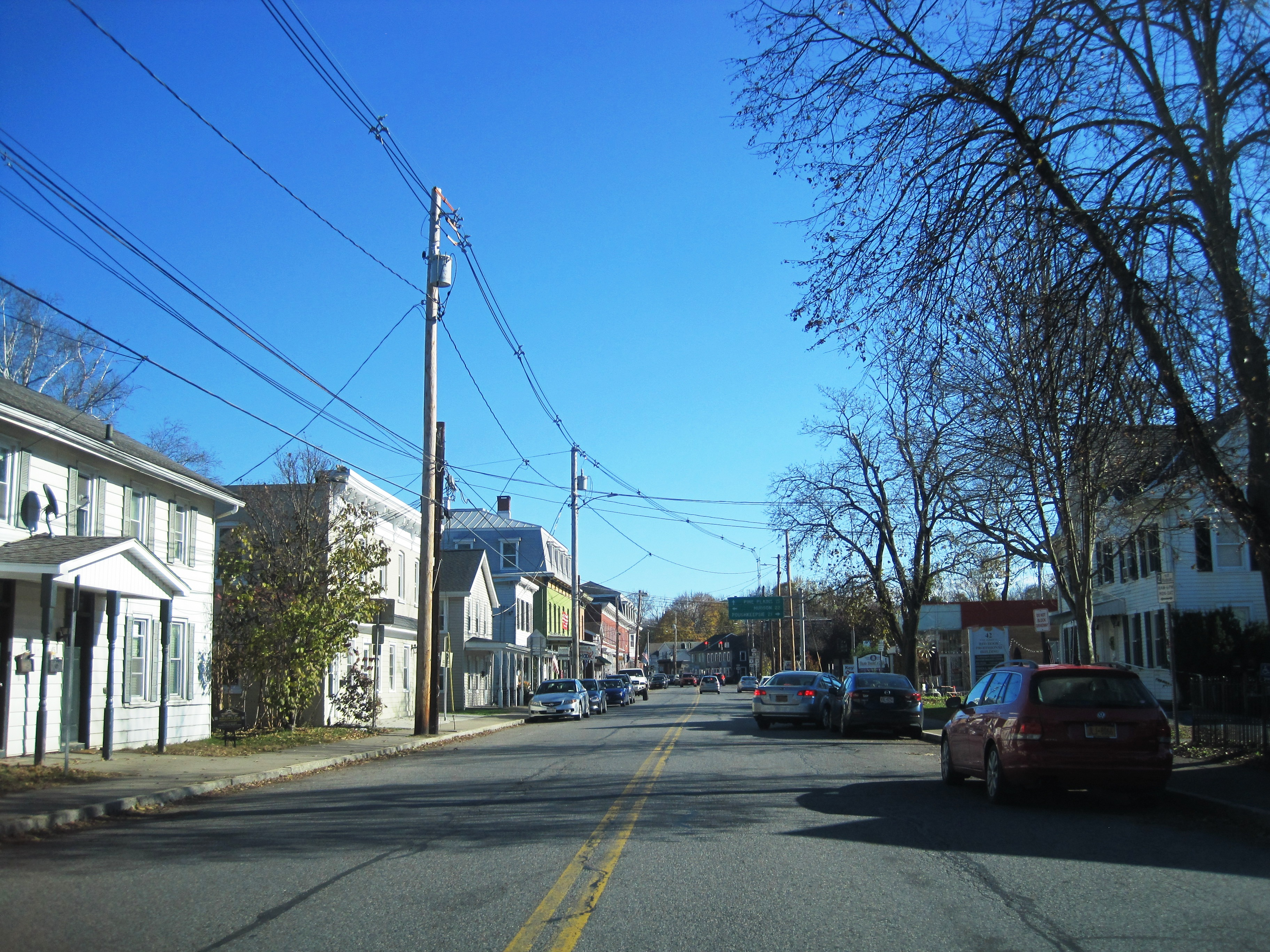
- Looking east along Market Street (NY 199)

- Location of Red Hook, New York
- Coordinates: 41°59′40″N 73°52′39″W
- Country: United States
- State: New York
- County: Dutchess
- Town: Red Hook
- Incorporation (village): 1894

Area
  - Total: 1.07 sq mi (2.77 km^{2})
  - Land: 1.05 sq mi (2.73 km^{2})
  - Water: 0.012 sq mi (0.03 km^{2})
- Elevation: 220 ft (67 m)

Population (2020)
  - Total: 1,975
  - Density: 1,872.7/sq mi (723.06/km^{2})
- Time zone: UTC-5 (Eastern (EST))
  - Summer (DST): UTC-4 (EDT)
- ZIP code: 12571
- Area code: 845
- FIPS code: 36-60895
- GNIS feature ID: 0962291
- Website: www.redhookvillage.gov

Red Hook is a village in Dutchess County, New York, United States. The population was 1,975 at the 2020 census. It is part of the Kiryas Joel–Poughkeepsie–Newburgh, NY Metropolitan Statistical Area as well as the larger New York–Newark–Bridgeport, NY-NJ-CT-PA Combined Statistical Area. The name is derived from the Dutch "Roode Hoeck" – hoeck meaning peninsula, and roode meaning red – a reference to the vibrant reds in the area's fall foliage.

The village is in the town of Red Hook, located on U.S. Route 9. Red Hook is near Bard College and the Hudson River.

== History ==
The region was part of the Schuyler Patent. The village was formerly "Lower Red Hook" and sometimes referred to as "Hardscrabble".

Nicholas Bonesteel and his wife, Anna Margretha Kuhns, were among the early settlers, possibly as early as 1723. A portion of the village lies on the easterly part of what once was their farm.

== Geography ==
According to the United States Census Bureau, the village has a total area of 1.1 square miles (2.9 km^{2}), of which 0.01 square miles (0.03 km^{2}), or 1.12%, is water.

== Demographics ==
Historical population
Census	Pop.	Note	%±
1870	861		—
1880	936		8.7%
1890	935		−0.1%
1900	857		−8.3%
1910	960		12.0%
1920	827		−13.9%
1930	996		20.4%
1940	1,056		6.0%
1950	1,225		16.0%
1960	1,719		40.3%
1970	1,680		−2.3%
1980	1,692		0.7%
1990	1,794		6.0%
2000	1,805		0.6%
2010	1,961		8.6%
2020	1,975		0.7%
U.S. Decennial Census

As of the census of 2000, there were 1,805 people, 765 households, and 491 families residing in the village. The population density was 1,664.9 inhabitants per square mile (642.8/km^{2}). There were 798 housing units at an average density of 736.1 per square mile (284.2/km^{2}). The racial makeup of the village was 95.46% white, .66% African-American, .06% Native American, 1.72% Asian, .06% Pacific Islander, 1.11% from other races, and .94% from two or more races. Hispanic or Latino of any race were 3.55% of the population.

There were 765 households, out of which 29.4% had children under the age of 18 living with them, 49.3% were married couples living together, 10.6% had a female householder with no husband present, and 35.7% were non-families. Of all households, 28.8% were made up of individuals, and 11.8% had someone living alone who was 65 years of age or older. The average household size was 2.36 and the average family size was 2.92.

In the village, the population was spread out, with 23.2% under the age of 18, 9.1% from 18 to 24, 28.0% from 25 to 44, 22.8% from 45 to 64, and 16.8% who were 65 years of age or older. The median age was 39 years. For every 100 females, there were 98.1 males. For every 100 females age 18 and over, there were 90.6 males.

The median income for a household in the village was $37,284, and the median income for a family was $48,125. Males had a median income of $35,580 versus $25,563 for females. The per capita income for the village was $20,618. About 4.9% of families and 8.6% of the population were below the poverty line, including 6.3% of those under age 18 and 2.0% of those age 65 or over.

== Transportation ==
Red Hook is served by Dutchess County Public Transit's route "C" bus.
