= Max Hebditch =

Maxwell Graham Hebditch CBE FSA (born 22 August 1937) was Director of the Museum of London in London, England.

He was born on 22 August 1937 in the Yeovil area, the son of Harold and Lily (née Bartle) Hebditch.

He was appointed the first Field Archaeologist of Leicester Museum service from 1961 to 1965, when he was made Assistant Curator of Archaeology at Bristol Museum, becoming their Curator of Agriculture and Social History in 1969. In 1970 he moved to London to become Director of the Guildhall Museum and from 1977 to 1997 was director of the new Museum of London. He was also president of the UK Museums Association; and from 1977 to 1979 president of the London and Middlesex Archaeological Society.

In 2000, after retiring from the Museum of London, he became honorary curator at the Philpot Museum in Lyme Regis, Dorset and was Chair of the Taunton Cultural Consortium. He now lives in Dorchester.

== Selected works ==
- 1958 Towards the future of London's past.
- 1968 Excavations on the medieval defences, Portwall Lane, Bristol, 1965
- 1973 The Forum and Basilica of Roman Leicester

Cultural offices
Preceded by Tom Hume	Director of the Museum of London; 1977–1997	Succeeded by Simon Thurley
