= London Museum =

- Charterhouse Street museum entrance
- Interactive fullscreen map
- Former name: Museum of London
- Established: December 1976; 49 years ago
- Location: Smithfield General Market, West Smithfield, London
- Coordinates: 51°31′04″N 0°06′17″W
- Type: History museum
- Collection size: 7,000,000
- Visitors: 141,835 (2021)
- Director: Sharon Ament
- Public transit access: Farringdon; Barbican
- Website: londonmuseum.org.uk

London Museum (known from 1976 to 2024 as the Museum of London) covers the history of the city from prehistoric to modern times, with a particular focus on social history. The Museum of London was formed in 1976 by amalgamating the collection previously held by the City Corporation at the Guildhall Museum (founded in 1826) and that of the London Museum (founded in 1911). From 1976 to 2022, its main site was in the City of London on London Wall, close to the Barbican Centre, part of the Barbican complex of buildings created in the 1960s and 1970s to redevelop a bomb-damaged area of the city. In 2015, the museum revealed plans to move to the General Market Building at the nearby Smithfield site. Reasons for the proposed move included the claim that the current site was difficult for visitors to find, and that by expanding, from 17,000 square metres to 27,000, a greater proportion of the museum's collection could be placed on display. In December 2022, the museum permanently closed its site at London Wall in preparation for reopening in 2026 at Smithfield Market. The museum changed its name and branding to "London Museum" in July 2024 in advance of the move.

The museum has the largest urban history collection in the world, with more than six million objects. It is primarily concerned with the social history of London and its inhabitants throughout time. Its collections include archaeological material, such as flint handaxes from the prehistoric Thames Valley, marble statues from a Roman temple called the London Mithraeum, and a cache of Elizabethan and Jacobean jewellery called the Cheapside Hoard. Its modern collections include large amounts of decorative objects, clothing and costumes, paintings, prints and drawings, social history objects, and oral histories. The museum continues to collect contemporary objects, such as the Whitechapel fatberg and the Trump baby blimp.

The museum is part of a group that also includes two other locations: London Museum Docklands, which is based in West India Quay and remains open to the public; and the Museum of London Archaeological Archive, based at Mortimer Wheeler House. The museum is jointly controlled and funded by the City of London Corporation and the Greater London Authority. Its current director is Sharon Ament.

== History ==
=== The Guildhall Museum (1826–1976) ===
One of the two museums that were merged to form the Museum of London was the Guildhall Museum, founded by the City of London Corporation in 1826 when it received the gift of a Roman mosaic from Tower Street as "a suitable place for the reception of such Antiquities as relate to the City of London and Suburbs". As the collection grew, it was given a room in the London Guildhall. The museum focused on archaeological remains from the city, and objects linked to the corporation, and had a particularly strong collection of Roman objects. It was mostly inaccessible to the public until 1872, when work was begun on dedicated premises in Basinghall Street. During World War II, the museum closed so that the corporation could use the building for other purposes, and after the war, in 1955, it re-opened in the Royal Exchange. However, this was not seen as a satisfactory long-term solution, and in 1960 the museum seriously started to engage with the scheme to merge with the London Museum.

=== The London Museum (1912–1976) ===
The museum has its origins in, and derives much of its collection from, the London Museum, founded in 1911 by Viscount Esher and Lewis Harcourt, 1st Viscount Harcourt and originally based in the State Apartments of Kensington Palace. It first opened to the public on 8 April 1912. Harcourt became the first Commissioner of Works, and the first Keeper was Guy Francis Laking. In 1913, it became a National Museum.

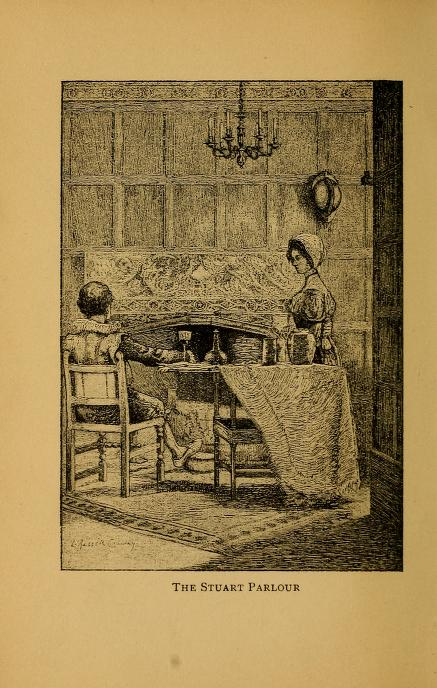
The Stuart Parlour display at the London Museum in Lancaster House, 1914

In 1914, it moved to Lancaster House, which had been bought by William Lever, 1st Viscount Leverhulme, soap magnate and founder of the model town of Port Sunlight, and given to the nation as a home for the London Museum. Visitors travelled through a mostly chronological route, entering the Prehistoric Room, the Roman Room, the Saxon and Early Norman Gallery, the Mediaeval Room, and finally a Jewellery Room before heading to the upper floor. Here, they would find the Tudor Room, the Early Seventeenth Century, the Late Seventeenth Century, a room with a large collection of porcelain, the Late Eighteenth and Nineteenth Century Room, and finally, the Costume Gallery. The museum also contained a basement which contained come exhibits from all eras, some of which were too large for the main galleries, and which could serve as an introduction to the collections. It included a Roman boat, a carriage belonging to the Arthur Wellesley, 1st Duke of Wellington, a parlour decorated in the Stuart style, and prison cells.

The Keeper of the London Museum from 1926 to 1944, Sir Mortimer Wheeler, proposed merging the London Museum with the Guildhall Museum as early as 1927, as the two museums had a significant overlap in their collections, but the scheme was not given serious thought until after both museums had been forced to close during World War II.

During the war, the museum closed, and in 1945 it vacated Lancaster House so that the government could use the space for hospitality events. The trustees considered several sites for the new museum, including Holland House and various sites on the South Bank. However, in the end, King George VI leased part of Kensington Palace for the museum to move back in. The new site opened in 1951.

The Kensington Palace museum kept a generally chronological structure to its layout, but alongside the rooms devoted to various time periods, there were separate galleries for historical shop fronts; prints; theatre; glass; paintings, toys and games; and royal costume. The glass room included Sir Richard Garton's collection of 437 pieces of 17th–19th century table glass, including goblets, wine glasses, bowls, candlesticks and decanters. The Print Room comprised around 3,000 watercolours and drawings and 7,000 prints, including a view of Whitehall and Westminster by Hendrick Danckerts made c.1675, The Cries of London by Paul Sandby, and works by Thomas Rowlandson, Wenceslaus Hollar, and James Abbott McNeill Whistler. The Theatre room included many theatrical costumes, several on loan from the Royal Shakespeare Theatre. These included Henry Irving's costumes for Malvolio and King Lear, the dress Anna Pavlova wore as The Dying Swan, and Ivor Novello's costume from The King's Rhapsody. There was also a clown costume worn by the comedy pioneer Joseph Grimaldi, a piano belonging to W. S. Gilbert, a death mask of David Garrick, and Walter Lambert's Popularity, a painting of dozens of music hall and variety stars. By the 1970s, multiple coronation robes were on display, from 1838, 1902, 1911, and 1937. There were also other items of royal clothing belonging to Charles I, a collection of Queen Victoria's dresses, and Princess Margaret's wedding dress designed by Norman Hartnell.

Museum of London Act 1965 (Note: Section 17.)
- Act of Parliament
- Parliament of the United Kingdom
- Long title: An Act to establish a Board of Governors of the Museum of London; to transfer to them the collections of the London Museum and of the Guildhall Museum and the benefit of certain funds; to define the functions of that Board, and to provide for purposes connected with the matters aforesaid.
- Citation: 1965 c. 17
- Territorial extent: United Kingdom

Dates
- Royal assent: 2 June 1965
- Commencement: 1 June 1975 (Note: Section 2. The Museum of London Act 1965 (Appointed Day) Order 1975.)
Other legislation
Amends	National Gallery and Tate Gallery Act 1954; Charities Act 1960; British Museum Act 1963
Amended by	National Theatre and Museum of London Act 1973; Local Government Superannuation (City of London) Regulations 1977; City of London (Various Powers) Act 1979; Local Government Act 1985; Museum Of London Act 1986; Museums and Galleries Act 1992; Charities Act 1993; Regulatory Reform (Museum of London) (Location of Premises) Order 2004; Greater London Authority Act 2007

Status: Amended

Text of statute as originally enacted

Text of the Museum of London Act 1965 as in force today (including any amendments) within the United Kingdom, from legislation.gov.uk.

In 1960, a plan was formed to merge the London Museum with the Guildhall Museum, to be funded jointly by the government, the City of London Corporation, and the Greater London Council. An act of Parliament, the Museum of London Act 1965 (c. 17), was passed to this effect in 1965. The City of London Corporation provided a site near what is now the Barbican Centre.

=== Museum of London (1976–2022) ===
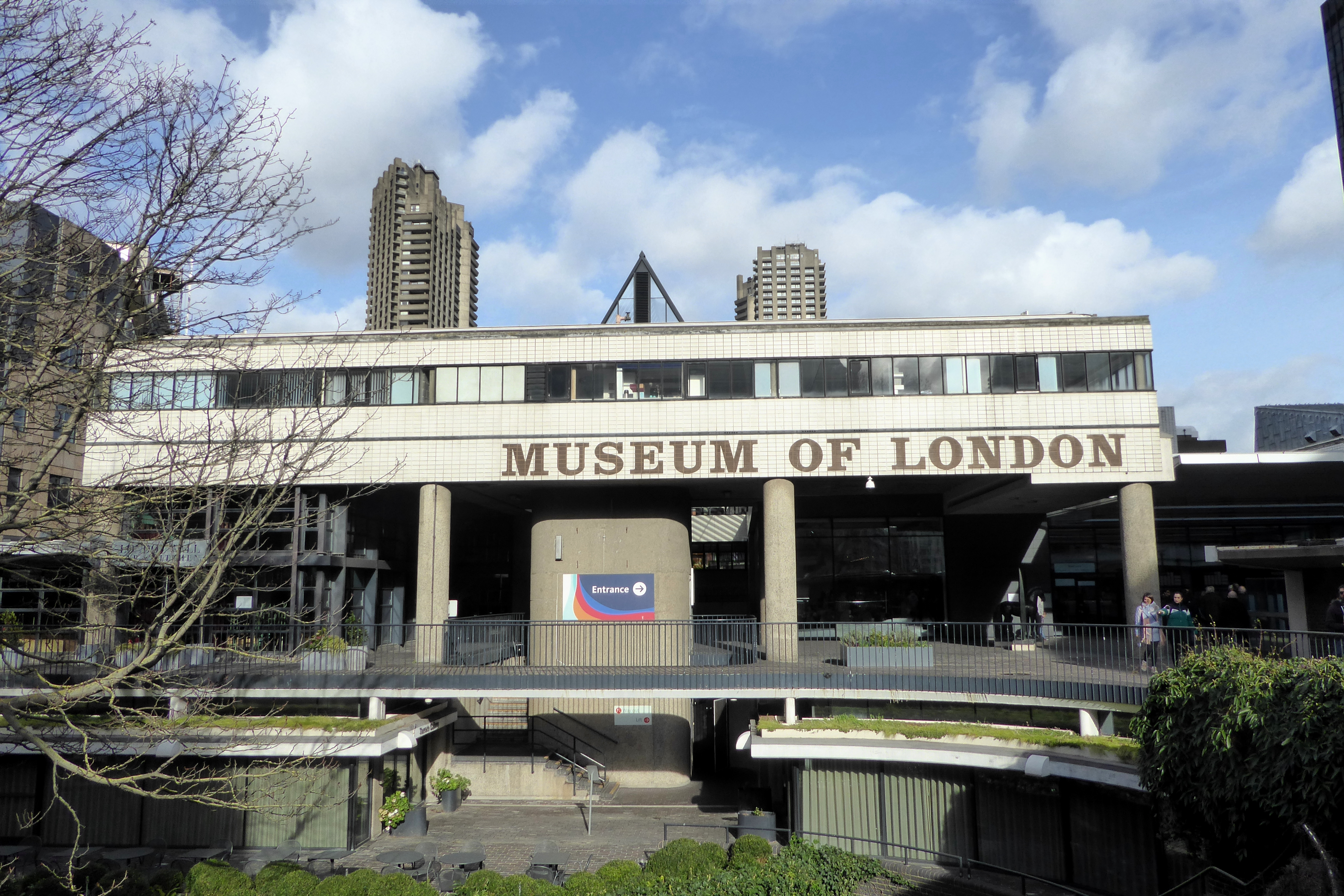
The Museum of London building at 150 London Wall, Barbican, now closed ahead of the museum's move to Smithfield

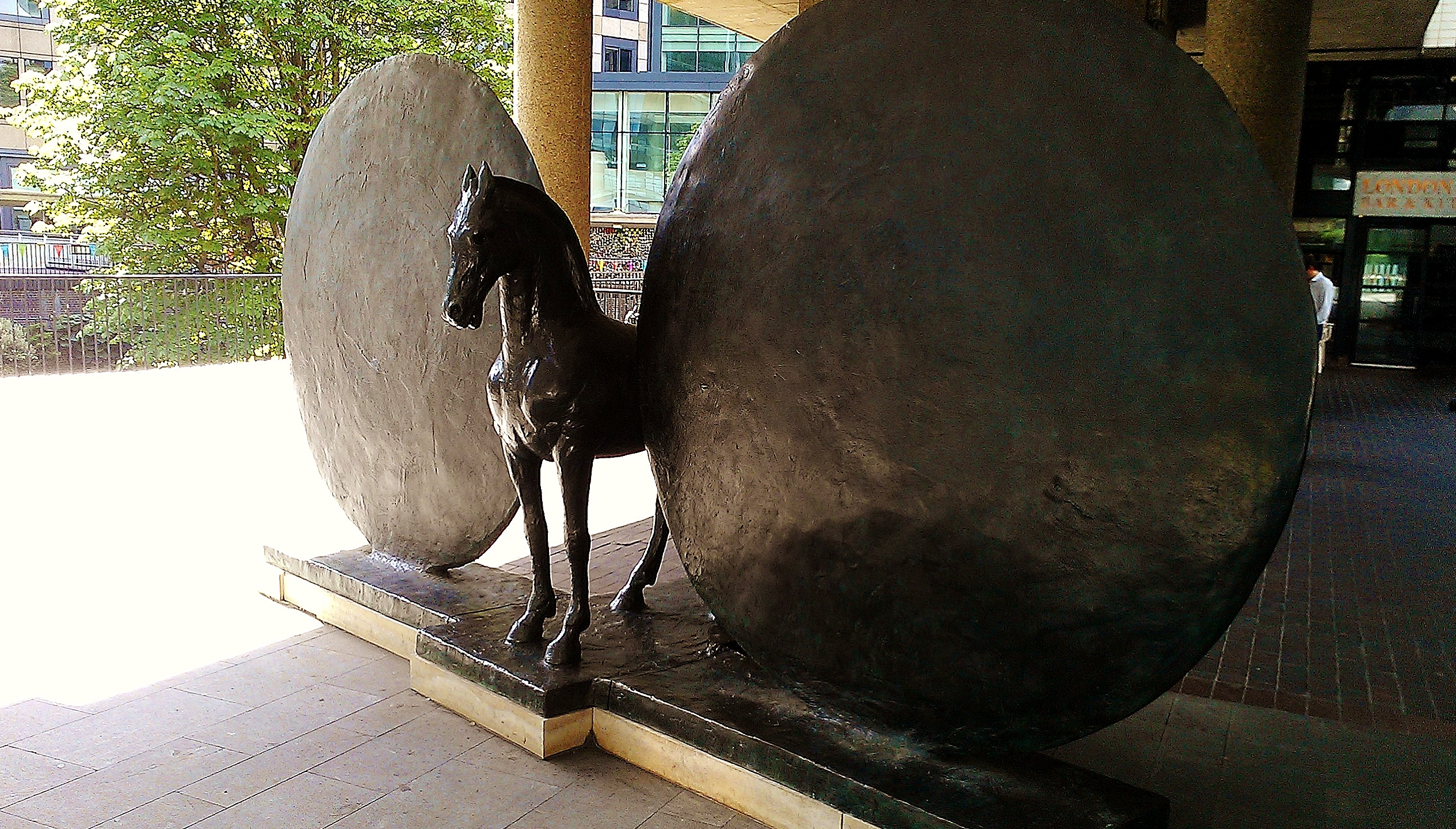
Union (Horse with Two Discs), a public sculpture by Christopher Le Brun outside the main entrance to the former Barbican site

The new site for the museum was at the corner of London Wall and Aldersgate Street, an area that had almost entirely been flattened by bombing in The Blitz. The architects appointed to oversee the construction of the new museum building were Philip Powell and Hidalgo Moya, who designed a complex with four main parts: a tower block containing offices and not open to the public; two floors of exhibition space arranged around a courtyard; a lecture theatre and education wing; and a rotunda containing a small garden and restaurant. With the museum galleries themselves, Powell and Moya adopted an innovative approach to museum design, whereby the galleries were laid out so that there was only one route through the museum – from the prehistoric period to the modern galleries. As in the previous incarnation of the museum, the galleries would be set out in a roughly chronological order. The building also incorporated a viewing window out onto one of the remaining pieces of London's city wall, originally built by the Romans around three sides of the city. Construction began in April 1971, with the foundation stone laid by the Queen Mother on 29 March 1973, and the museum was opened in December 1976 by Queen Elizabeth II as part of the Barbican Estate.

As in the London Museum, visitors entered a series of rooms set out in chronological order, moving anti-clockwise around the main courtyard on the upper floor through London's history up to the Great Fire in 1666, and then descending to the lower level and moving clockwise around the courtyard up to the present day. Visitors would finish their visit by the Lord Mayor of London's State Coach.

In November 2002, the previous The Thames In Prehistory gallery was replaced with an entirely new display titled London Before London.

The Greater London Authority Act 2007 transferred responsibility for the management of the museum from being jointly managed by the Department for Culture, Media and Sport and the City of London Corporation to being jointly managed by the Greater London Authority and the City of London.

A £20 million redevelopment called the "Galleries of Modern London" was completed in May 2010, the museum's biggest investment since opening in 1976. The redesign, by London-based architects Wilkinson Eyre, comprised the entire lower floor of the main galleries, covering the period from the 1670s to the present day. The Galleries of Modern London displayed a total of 7,000 objects. Star exhibits included a mummified cat, a 1928 Art Deco lift from Selfridges department store on Oxford Street, and a complete 18th century debtors' prison cell covered in graffiti.

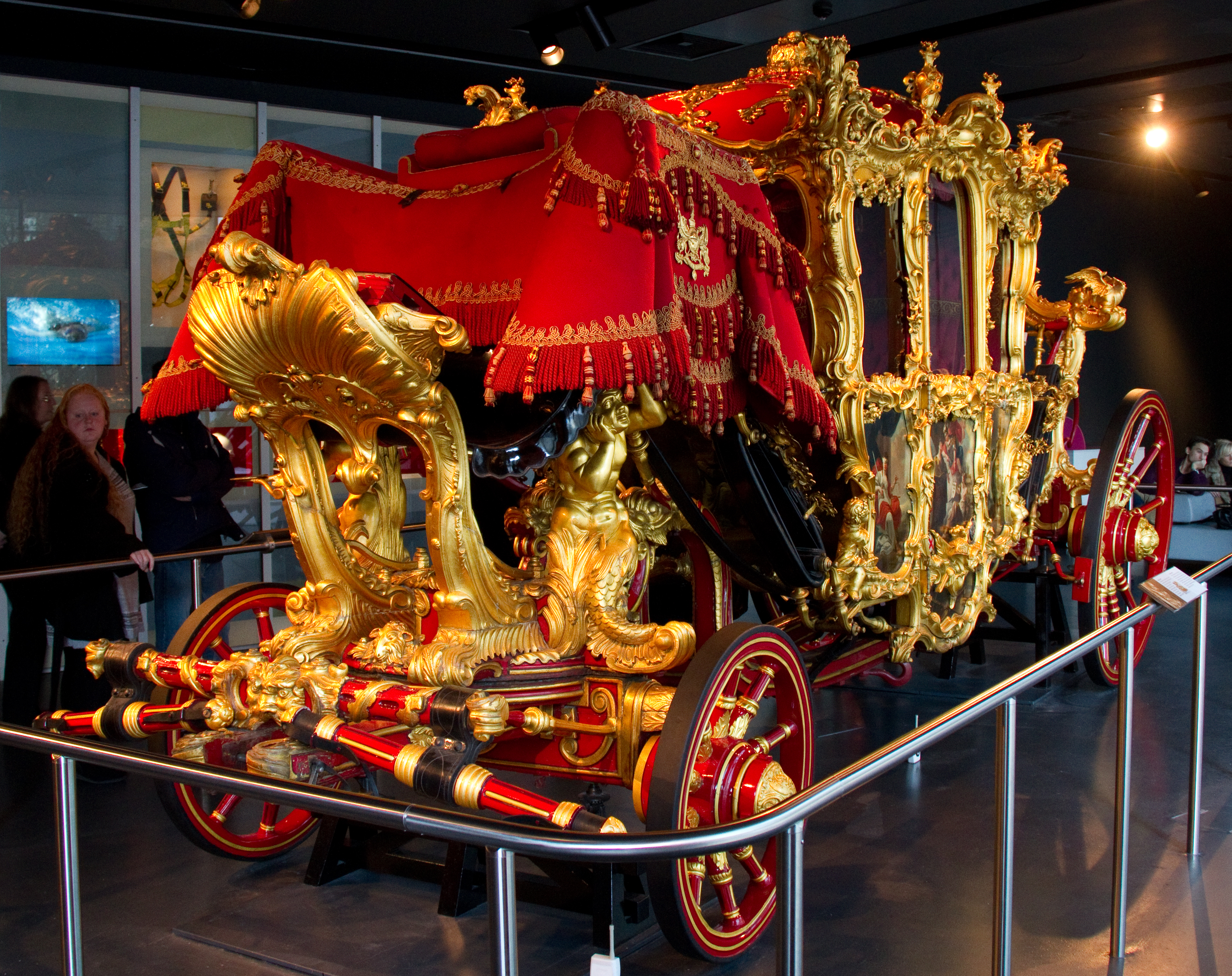
The Lord Mayor of London's State Coach on display in the Museum's former Barbican galleries

The transformation included four new galleries. The Expanding City gallery covered the period 1670–1850. People's City addressed 1850–1940s, including a "Victorian Walk" displaying some of the museum's real office and shop frontages and interiors; objects relating to the suffragette movement; and pages of Charles Booth's 1888 "poverty map", colour-coding London's streets according to the relative wealth of their inhabitants. World City was the gallery containing objects dating from the 1950s to the present day, including 1950s suits, a Mary Quant dress from the 1960s, Biba fashion in the 1970s, outfits from London's punk scene, and a pashmina from Alexander McQueen's 2008 collection. Finally, the City Gallery featured large, street-level windows along London Wall that allowed passers-by to view the Lord Mayor of London's State Coach, which takes to the streets each November for the Lord Mayor's Show.

In 2014, the museum opened a new gallery displaying the cauldron from the 2012 Summer Olympics. The cauldron was made up of 204 steel stems, each tipped with a copper "petal", which could be raised or lowered to create various formations. When all the petals were raised to their full height, they together formed the shape of a cauldron. The gallery featured 97 of the original stems, wooden moulds for the copper petals, Great Britain's Paralympic petal, and footage showing the cauldron in use during the opening and closing ceremonies of the Olympiad. The room also showed interviews with some of the creators, including lead designer Thomas Heatherwick and an engineer called Gemma Webster.

=== London Museum (2026–present) ===
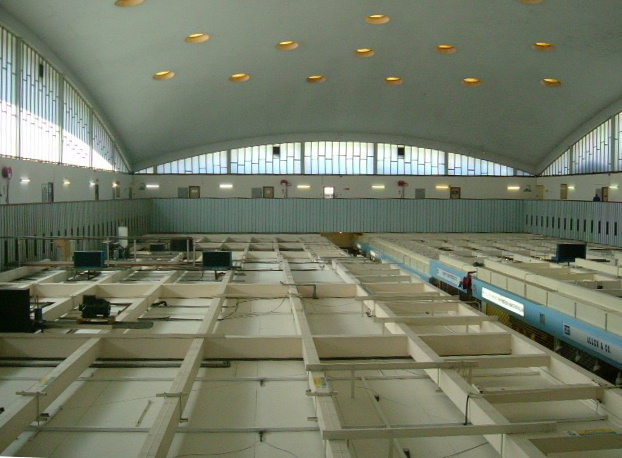
The interior of one of the Smithfield Market buildings that will be occupied by the museum on its new site

In 2016, the museum announced it would be closing its London Wall site and moving to a set of disused market buildings in West Smithfield in 2021. The new site will increase the museum's size from 17,000 square metres to over 27,000. Museum director Sharon Ament said that one reason for the move was "a failing building with problematic entrances and a location which is difficult to find". A competition was held to find an architectural firm to design the new building, with over 70 firms taking part. Six were shortlisted, and their initial designs released to the public in 2016. Stanton Williams and Asif Khan were chosen as the final architects.

The site at Smithfield includes part of the Thameslink train line running into Farringdon Station, and from an early point in the process, the museum expressed interest in creating a see-through section of tunnel for commuters to glimpse inside the museum and visitors to see the train go by. It also includes the River Fleet, a tributary of the Thames which has long since become buried underground due to the high volume of construction work around it. One early plan for the new museum, since scrapped, included creating a well reaching down to the Fleet, which has been completely covered since the 1870s. Another idea for the new museum is to revive the ancient St Bartholomew's Fair, which took place on the site regularly in the medieval period until being shut down by authorities in 1855. The museum will also feature spiral escalators taking visitors to the underground storage rooms which will function as the main historical galleries.

In 2019, further plans were released, which showed late-night queues outside the museum frontage and visitors perusing real items from the museum's collection. Ament announced that workers had found the remains of a Victorian café called the Temperance Cocoa Room, complete with original tiling, and that the museum intended to re-open this section as a café.

The scheme was originally set to cost £250 million and open in 2021; current estimates are that it will cost £337 million and open in 2026. Ament blamed the rising cost on the difficulty of working with an old building: "It is to do with things like waterproofing a building that hasn't needed to be water-proofed, it is to do with engineering".

In August 2022, the museum announced that a previously unknown freshwater spring had been found underneath the new site. Tests revealed that it was safe to drink, and Ament claimed that she hoped visitors would be able to "fill up their water bottles from it".

On 4 December 2022, the museum closed its site at London Wall ahead of the move. It was also announced that when the new site opened in 2026, it would be called the London Museum. The new London Museum in Smithfield is set to open on 28 November 2026.

Once the museum has vacated the London Wall site, it will revert to the City of London Corporation. In 2019, plans were revealed to use the site to house a London Centre For Music, a £288m concert hall for use by the London Symphony Orchestra. However, in 2022, the Corporation submitted plans to demolish the building, including the Bastion House office block above, and replace it with a 780,000 sq. ft office block, citing dangerous structural issues, poor energy performance, fire safety and limited possible uses as reasons in favour of demolition. In May 2024, demolition remained the likely option after the Secretary of State for Levelling Up, Housing and Communities Michael Gove decided not to intervene, and in November 2024 Historic England issued a Certificate of Immunity from Listing, guaranteeing that the building would not be statutorily listed within the next five years.

== Collections ==
The museum holds in its collections objects covering 10,000 years of London's history, totalling around 7 million objects. It combines the original collections of both the Guildhall Museum and London Museum, plus objects that the Museum of London acquired since its foundation in the 1970s, such as archaeological finds, photographs, oral histories, and video games.

In particular, the museum owns a large collection of objects relating to London's docks, leading to the opening of a secondary site, the London Museum Docklands, in 2003.

=== Pre-modern collections ===
The museum has over 13,000 prehistoric objects, including the Havering Hoard, the largest Bronze Age hoard thus far discovered in London, and the third-largest of its kind in the UK. It includes 453 bronze objects, such as axe heads, spearheads and knives made between 900 and 800 BCE, which had almost all been broken or damaged, and buried carefully in four separate groups around the site. The museum put on a temporary exhibition of the hoard at its Docklands site in 2020.

The Roman collection totals over 47,000 objects, mostly from the Roman-occupied areas of the City of London and Southwark, including the UK's largest collection of terra sigillata (samianware). It also includes entire wall paintings and floors such as the Bucklersbury Mosaic; metalwork such as hipposandals, cutlery, jewellery and tweezers; four leather "bikini bottoms", possibly worn by female acrobats; and a wooden ladder. In September 1954, a Roman temple to the god Mithras was discovered in the City of London. An estimated 400,000 members of the public visited the site while it was being excavated, a job which was mostly carried out by archaeology students led by the then director of the London Museum, W. F. Grimes. The building stones of the temple have been reconstructed on their original site at the London Mithraeum, while the marble carvings found inside are part of the collections of the London Museum.

The museum owns around 12,000 medieval objects, including 700 from the Saxon period, and over 1,350 pewter pilgrim badges.

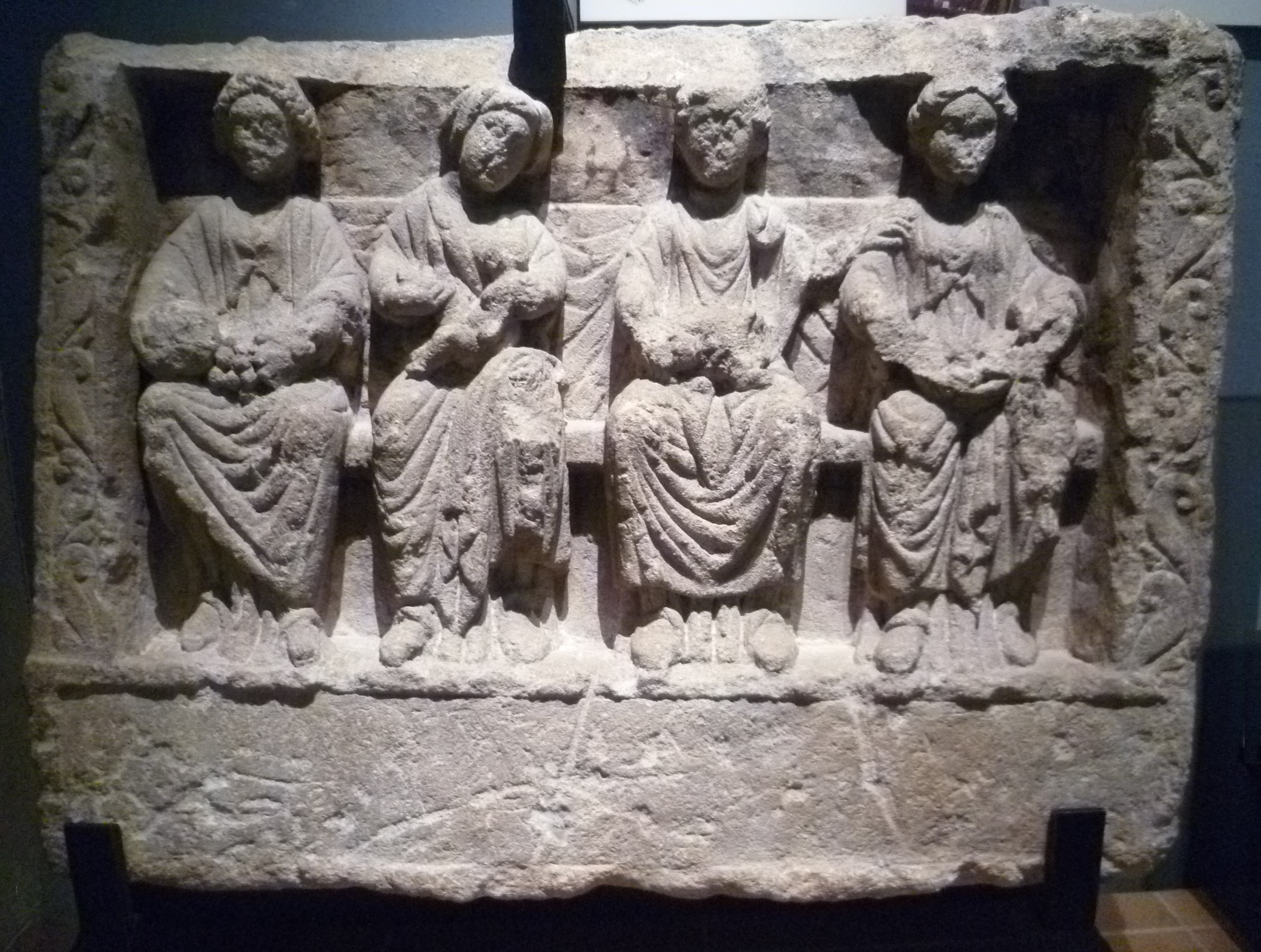
One of the Museum's many artefacts from Roman London, dating from the 3rd century AD.

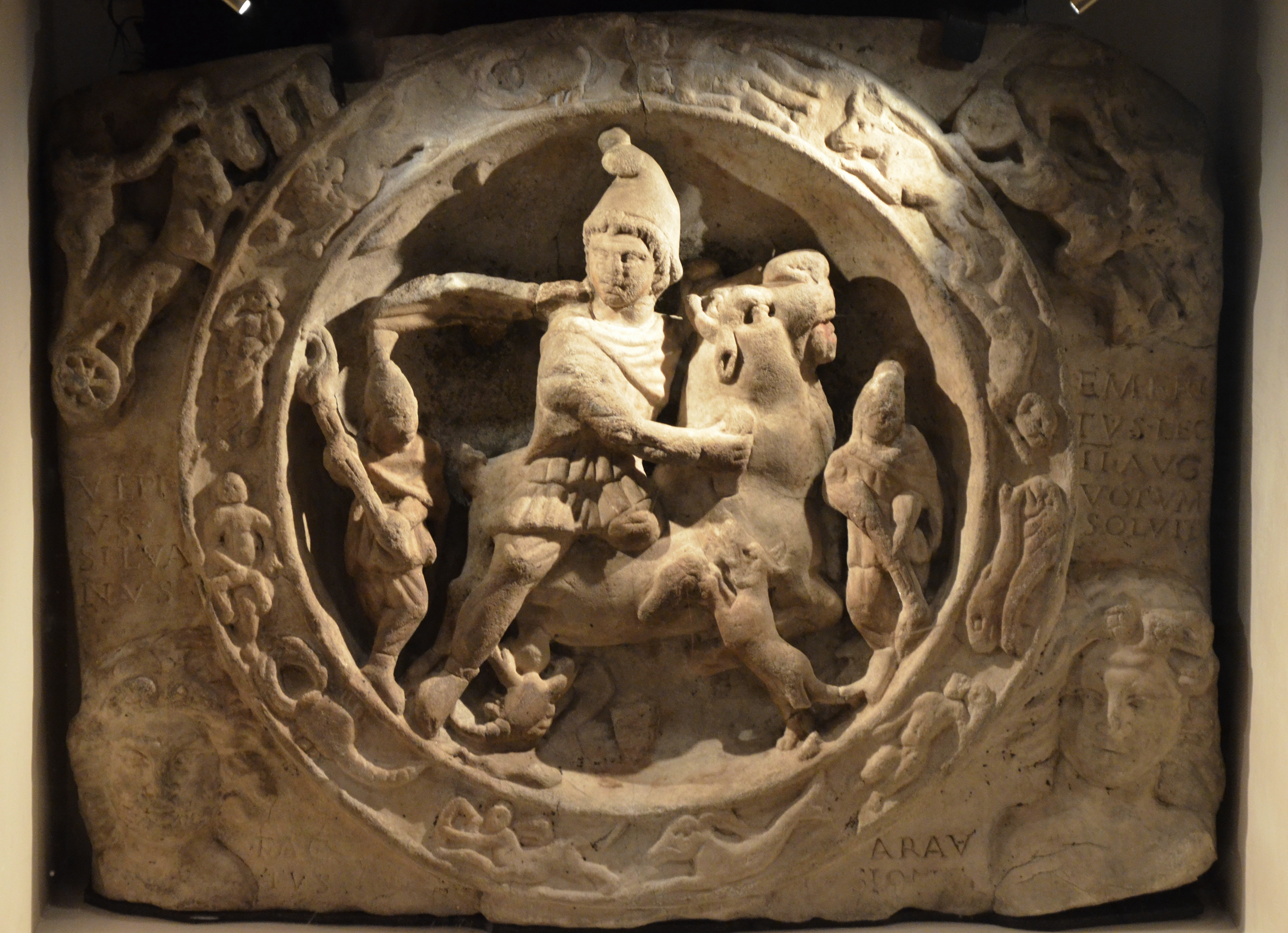
A white marble relief from the London Mithraeum, depicting the god Mithras slaying a bull

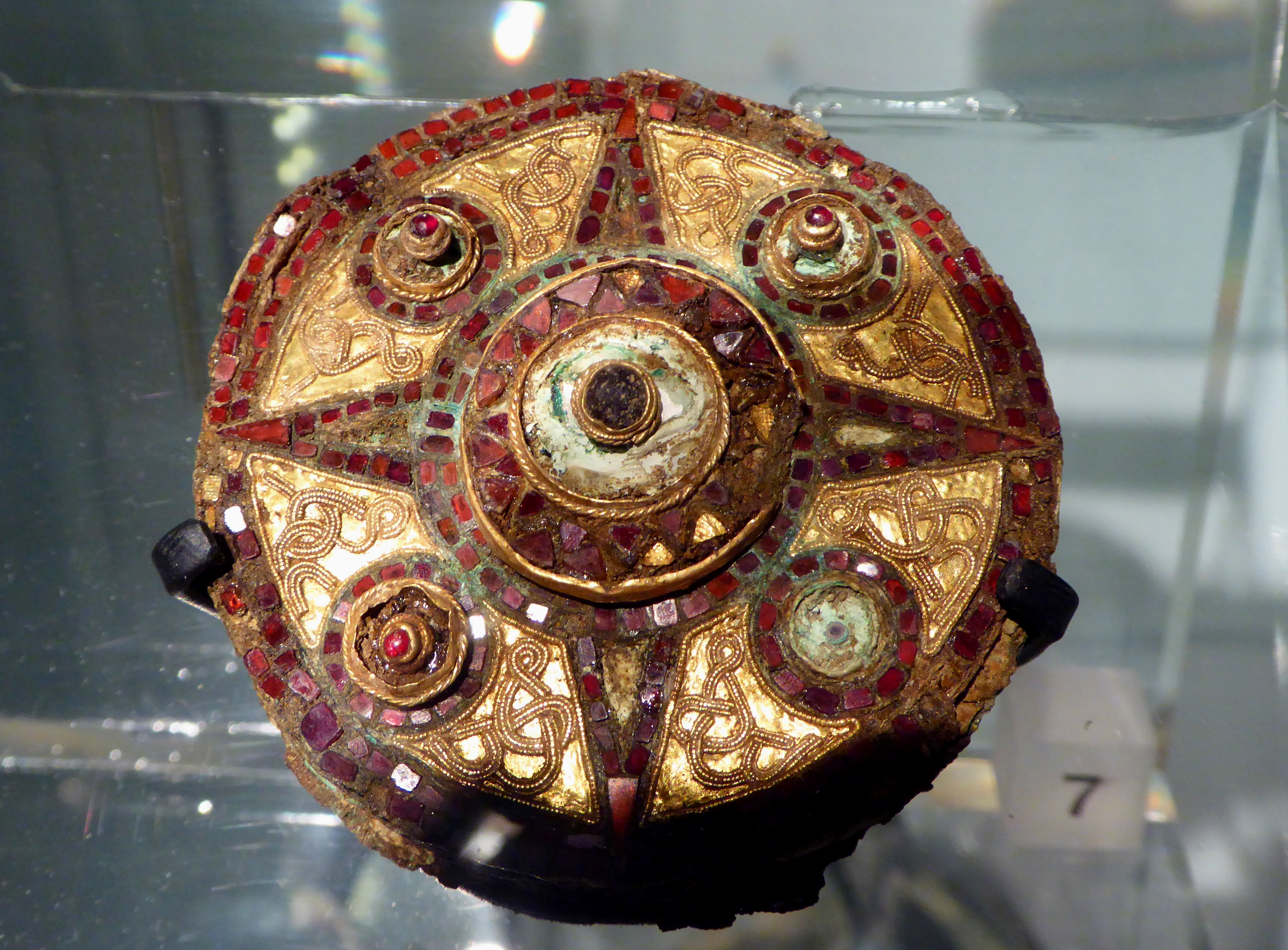
A Saxon copper brooch, decorated with gold and garnets

=== Early modern and modern collections ===
The museum holds over 1,500 pieces of Tudor and Stuart cutlery, mostly recovered from the Thames, and some purchased from the private collection of Hilton Price. One of the most well-known and popular groups in the museum's collection from this period is the Cheapside Hoard, a hoard of almost 500 Tudor and Jacobean pieces of jewellery found in 1912 on Cheapside in the City of London. The entire hoard went on display for the first time as a temporary exhibition at the museum in 2013. In 2017, it was announced that the Worshipful Company of Goldsmiths would donate £10 million to the museum in order to secure a permanent display for the Cheapside Hoard at the new museum site in West Smithfield.

Demonstrating London's manufacturing prowess has been one of the museum's goals since the inception of the London Museum in 1911. To that end, the museum has pieces from London manufacturers like James Powell and Sons, also known as Whitefriars Glass; and Martin Brothers; and objects related to trades such as clockmaking, coopering, silk-weaving, engraving, and silversmithing. Donors such as Joan Evans, Catherine d'Erlanger, Mary of Teck, Jane Anne Gordon and Lady Cory have enlarged the museum's collection of jewellery, particularly mourning jewellery, chatelaines and costume jewellery.

The museum also collects more general social and working history objects relating to the everyday lives and trade of ordinary Londoners. This includes shop fronts, food packaging, telephone kiosks, vehicles, and a large collection of "penny toys"- toys costing a penny. The museum holds an internationally important collection of suffragette material, largely from the archive of the suffrage group, the Women's Social and Political Union; the archives of the Whitefriars Glassworks, and papers relating to Kibbo Kift, and a substantial amount of material relating to London's port and the River Thames, much of which is on display at the museum's secondary site, the London Museum Docklands. The museum holds over 5,000 hours of oral histories; and the archives of the Port of London Authority and the supermarket chain Sainsbury's.

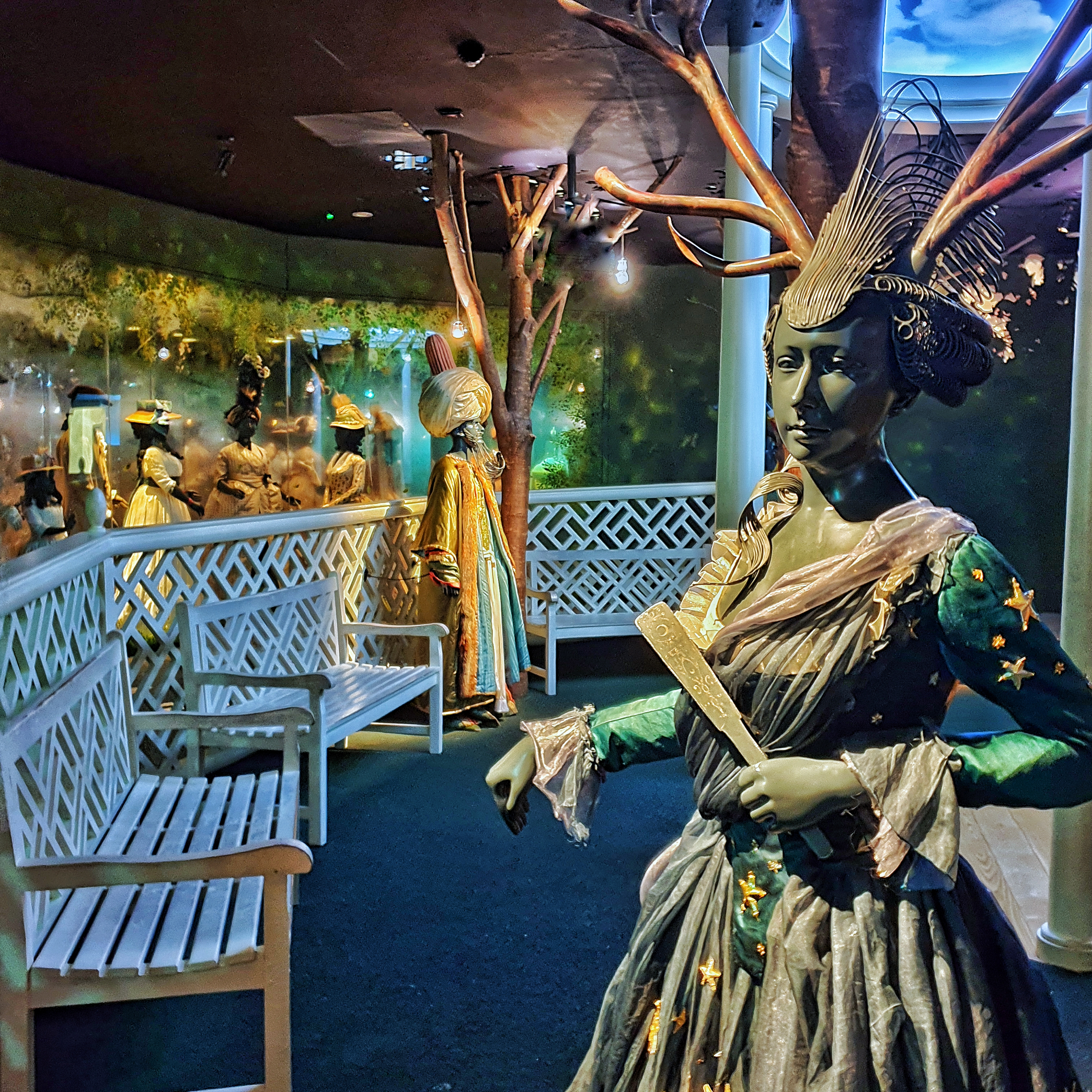
The pre-2022 museum's fantastical recreation of Vauxhall Pleasure Gardens

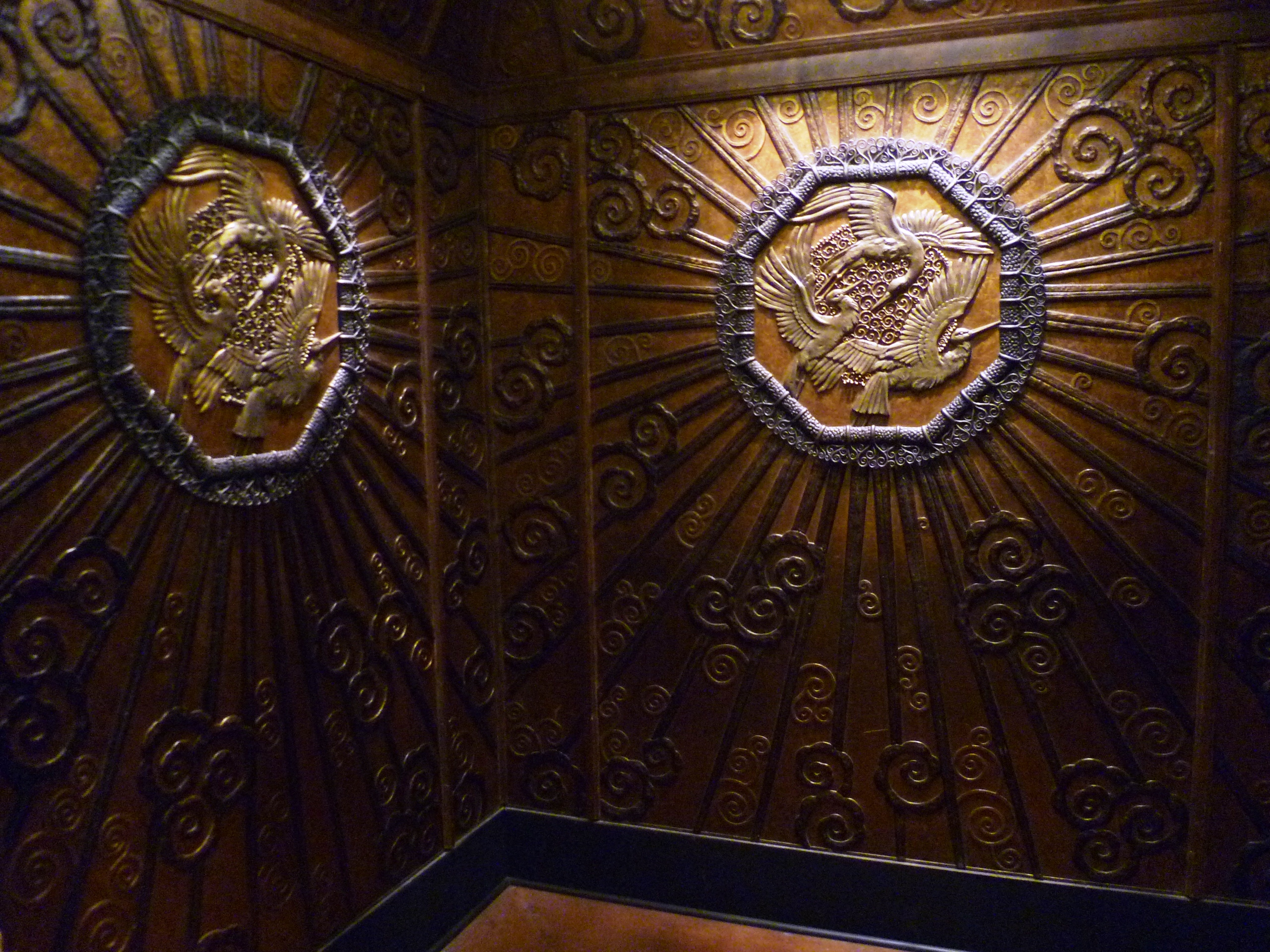
Interior of a Selfridges lift from 1928 in the former 20th-century section

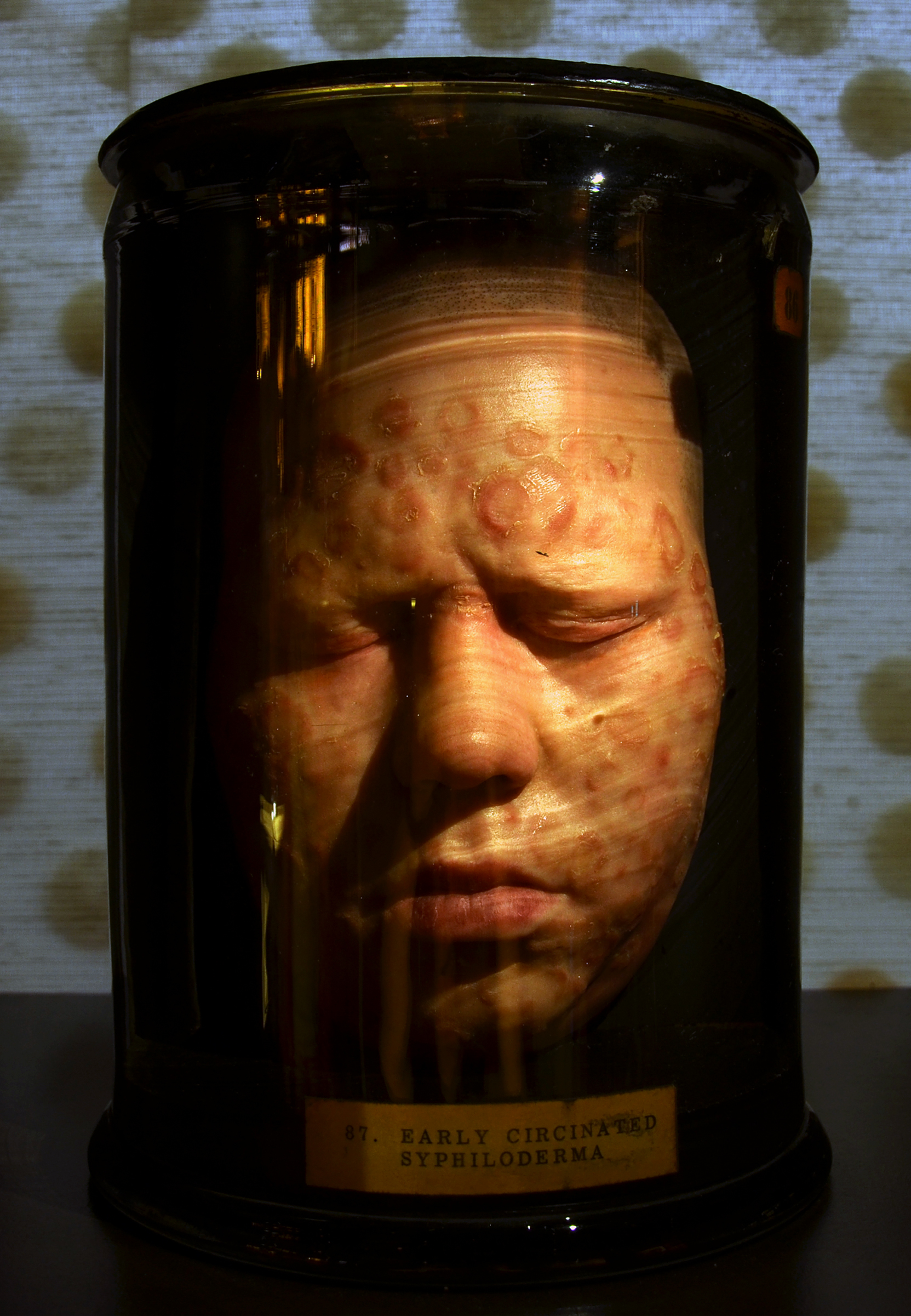
A wax head, showing the effects of syphilis

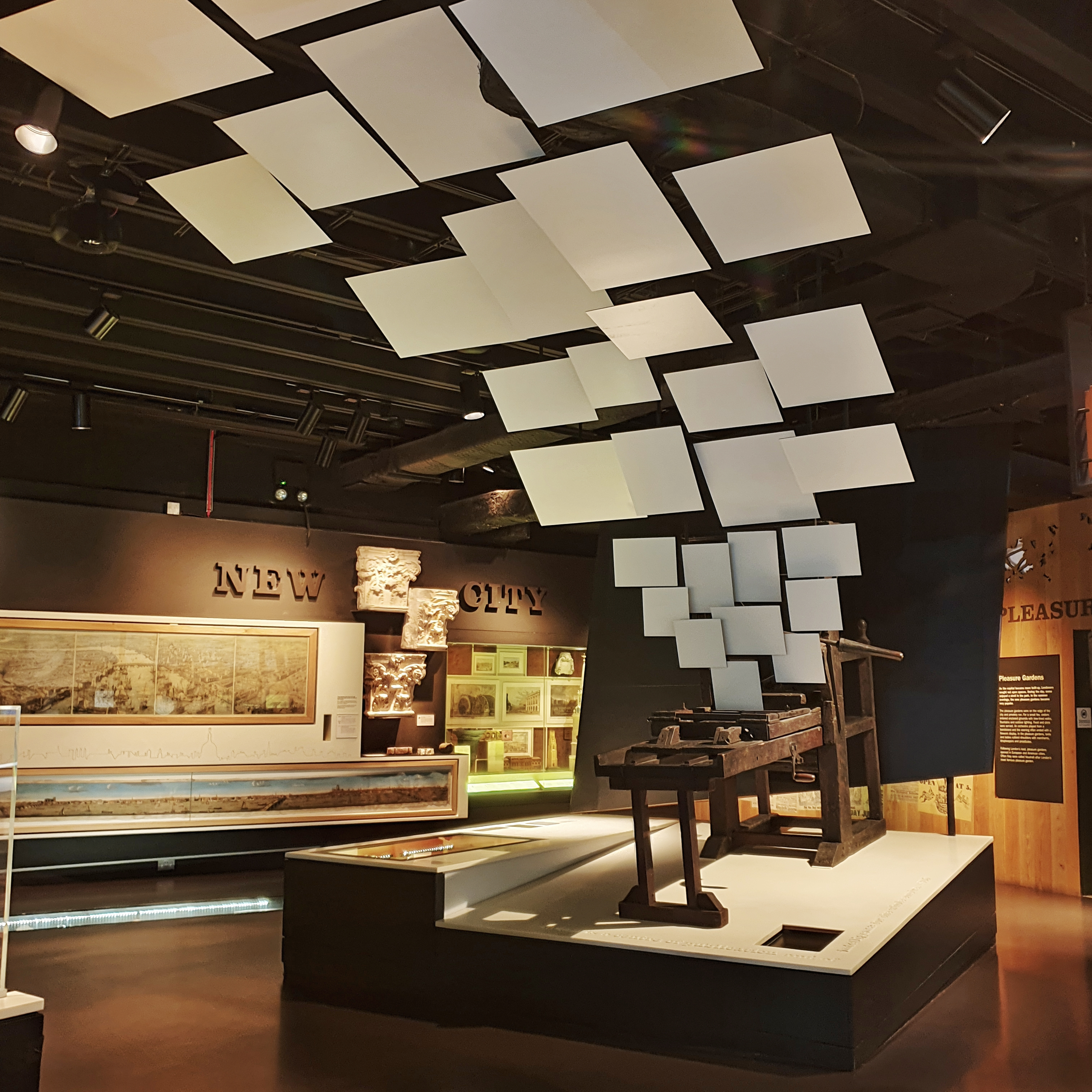
A printing press on display at the pre-2022 museum, with leaflets flying out

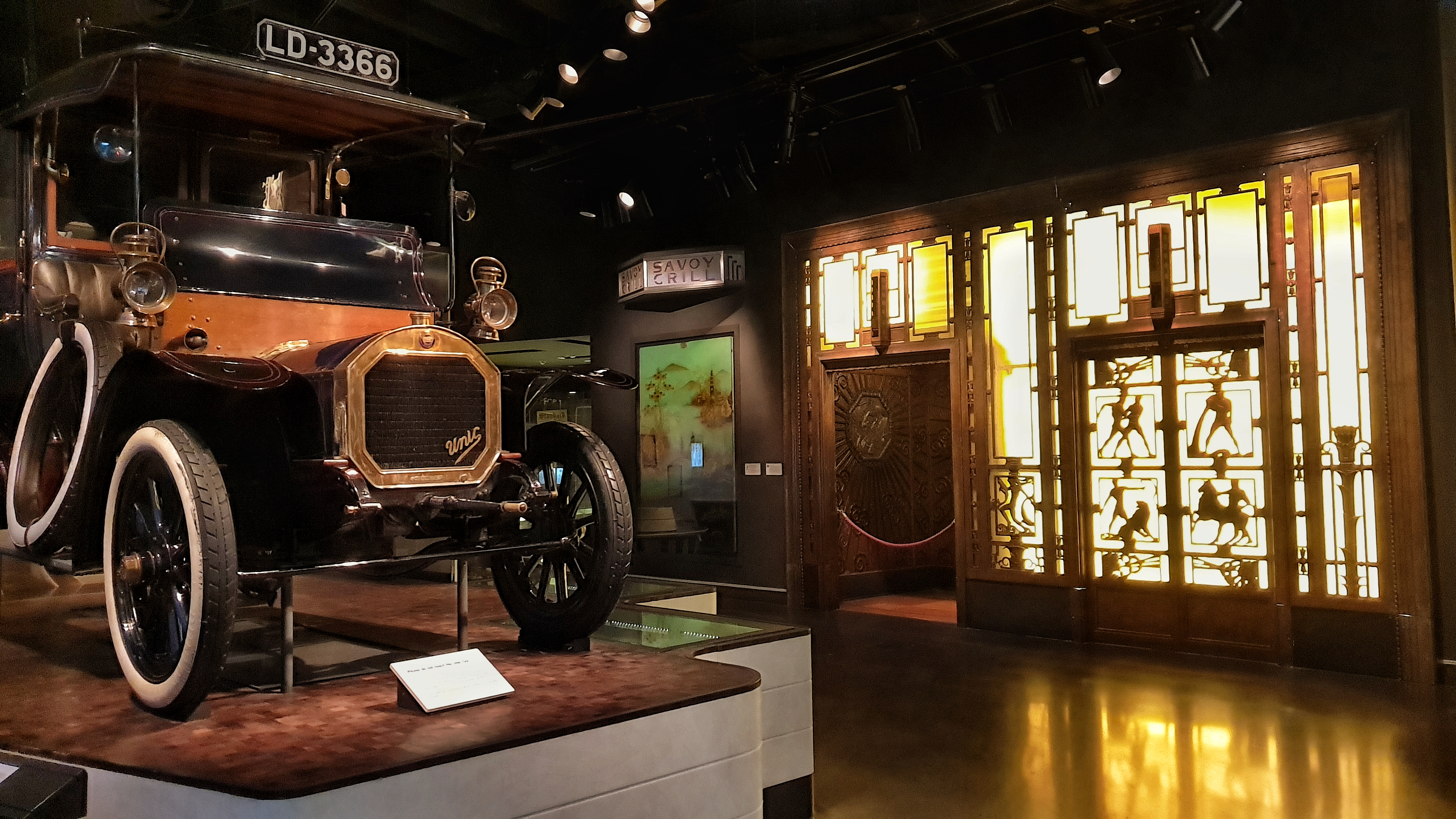
A UNIC taxicab and panels from a lift in Selfridges on display at the pre-2022 museum

=== Contemporary collecting ===
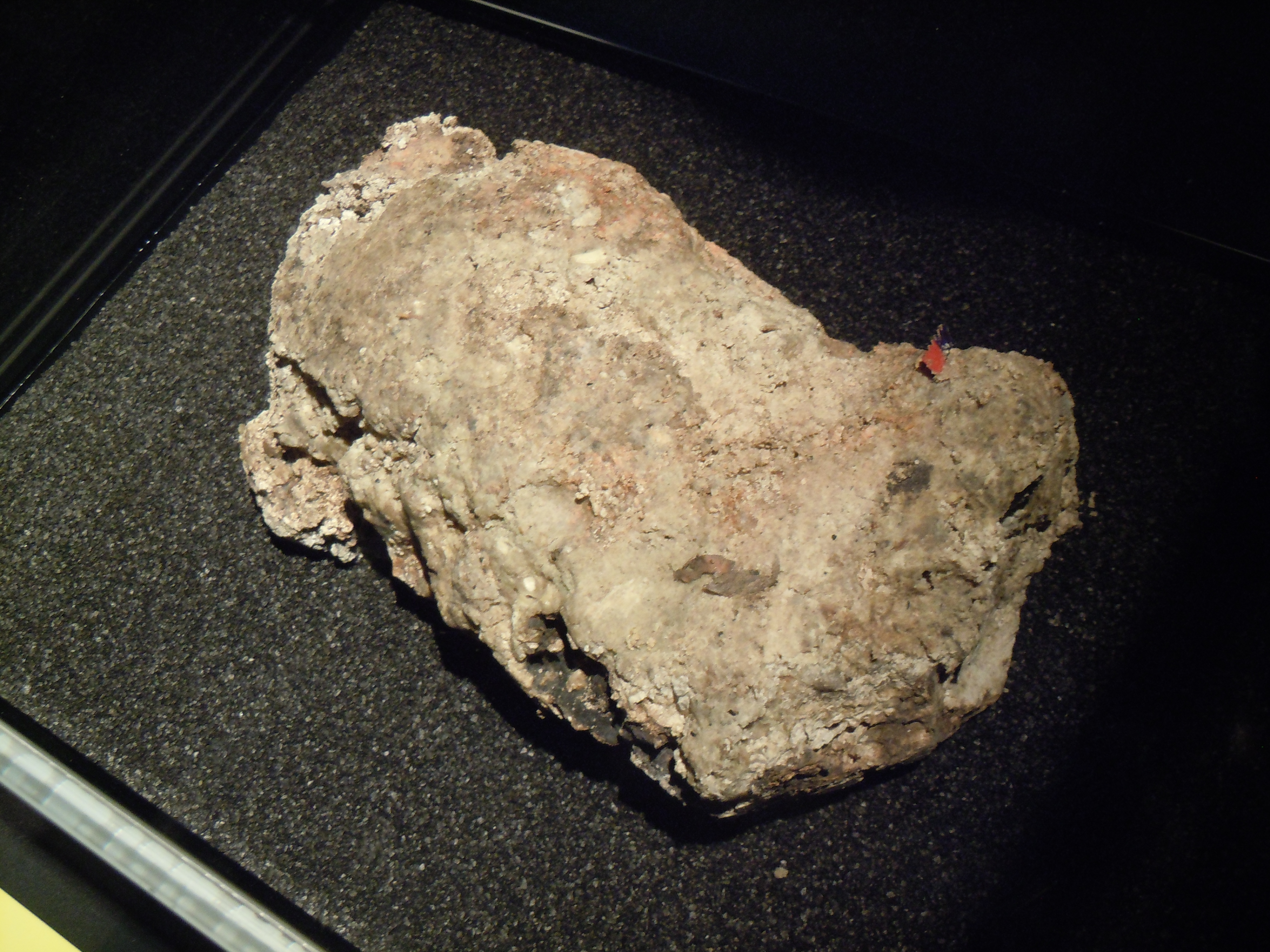
A dried section of the Whitechapel fatberg on display at the pre-2022 Museum of London

The museum also collects contemporary objects, including those connected to national news stories. During the 2012 London Summer Olympics, the Museum of London collected tweets using the hashtag #citizencurators, both by the public and by a select group of 18 contributors from across the city.

In 2016, the museum attempted to buy a water-cannon truck bought by then-Mayor of London Boris Johnson. In the summer of 2014, Johnson bought three water cannon trucks from the German federal police for £218,000 in order to combat civil unrest. These were then banned for use in the UK by Home Secretary Theresa May, and could not be deployed. Johnson attempted to sell them. The museum tried to buy one, but the trucks were only available to European policing or civil protection organisations. Unable to find a buyer, the trucks were sold to a reclamation yard in 2018 for £3,675 each. The museum's director, Sharon Ament, expressed interest in collecting some of the scrap or salvage, but no part of the trucks has yet entered the museum's collection.

In 2018, the museum displayed a section of the Whitechapel fatberg, a solid lump of fat and grease that had formed in the sewer network underneath Whitechapel. After being on display for several months, the chunk was removed from the galleries and placed in a freezer, where fans could view it around the clock on a live webcam.

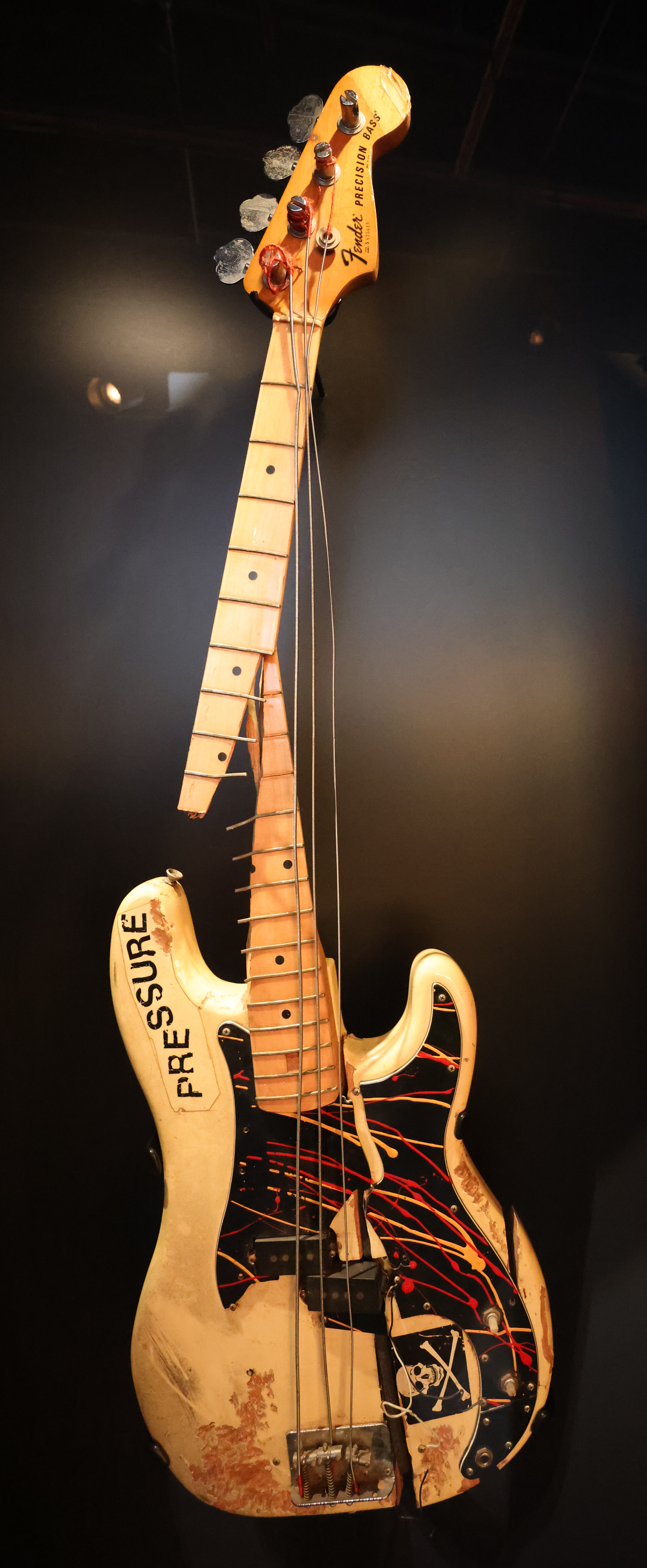
Paul Simonon's smashed bass guitar, on display at the pre-2022 Museum of London

In January 2021, the museum acquired a giant inflatable blimp depicting former US President Donald Trump as a giant baby. The 6 metre-high blimp was designed by Matt Bonner to protest Trump's visit to the UK in 2018, and has since been flown around the world in protest of the president's regime.

In April 2020, the museum put out a call for donations of objects and oral histories connected to the global COVID-19 pandemic. As part of the Collecting Covid project, London Zoo donated a large illuminated sign showing the logo of the UK's National Health Service surrounded by hearts, which was hung outside their giraffe house during lockdown in March 2020. In July 2020, sound designers String and Tins made recordings of soundscapes in London streets that had become deserted due to pandemic lockdowns for the museum's collection. In October 2020, Arsenal football player Pierre-Emerick Aubameyang donated his shirt featuring a Black Lives Matter logo, which had been worn by him during games that season. The logo had been added to all Premier League shirts for the summer 2020 season following widespread protests against racial violence in London and around the world.

During celebrations for the Islamic festival of Ramadan, the museum collected thousands of messages from a WhatsApp group made up of five Muslim women in West London sharing their reflections on celebrating during lockdown. In January 2021, the museum announced the acquisition of thirteen tweets made by Londoners during lockdown. In February 2021, Mayor of Lambeth Philip Normal donated his chain of office, which he had made from card and t-shirt fabric while the real one was locked up in the town hall. Normal had a virtual appointment ceremony to the role in April 2020. The museum also asked volunteers to describe their "pandemic dreams" to collect oral histories of how the pandemic affected Londoners' sleep cycles.

On June 17th, 2025, Museum of London Archaeology (MOLA) completed the painstaking reconstruction of a fully intact Roman fresco comprising thousands of plaster fragments. The fresco, originally from a high-status building in Southwark, dating to before AD 200, features rare yellow-panel designs depicting birds, fruit, flowers, lyres, and even preserved graffiti—making it one of the largest Roman wall plaster artworks discovered in London.

=== Costume collection ===
A 1760s dress on display in the pre-2022 museum

The museum has 23,000 pieces of dress and textiles. The London Museum was the first British museum to produce a catalogue of its costume collection, in 1933. The museum's collection includes pieces by Lucile, Hardy Amies, Norman Hartnell, Victor Stiebel, Mary Quant, Katharine Hamnett, and Vivienne Westwood. It also includes several pieces of royal clothing, including a shirt thought to have belonged to Charles I; many theatrical, ballet, circus, music hall, and opera costumes; and silk garments woven in Spitalfields. Outside of clothing, the museum holds banners and sashes related to the female suffrage campaign of the early 20th century, the Kindred of the Kibbo Kift, and dockworker trade unions. The dress collection includes several objects examined by fashion historian Janet Arnold in her book series Patterns of Fashion.

=== Art and photography collections ===
The museum holds over 100,000 paintings, prints and drawings, including works by Wenceslaus Hollar, Paul Sandby, Canaletto, William Powell Frith, George Elgar Hicks, Walter Greaves, Henry Moore, Graham Sutherland, Thomas Rowlandson, C. R. W. Nevinson, and Spencer Gore. The museum's collection also contains portraits of London figures such as military leader and politician Oliver Cromwell and suffrage campaigner and activist Sylvia Pankhurst; and several panoramas and views of London such as the Rhinebeck Panorama, an 180° aerial view made around 1806, looking west from where Tower Bridge stands today.

The London Museum has collected around 150,000 photographs focussing on everyday life in London. The earliest example dates from c.1845 and shows a view of the then-newly opened Hungerford Bridge taken by Henry Fox Talbot. Other photographs include views of London dating back to c.1855 by Roger Fenton; Bill Brandt's series taken inside World War II air raid shelters; scenes of the building of the first line of what is now the London Underground transport network; pictures of suffragette protests taken by pioneering female photographer Christina Broom; and works by British photographer Henry Grant. The largest work in this collection is a camera obscura print made by Vera Lutter showing Battersea Power Station, at 7 feet (2.1m) high.

== Exhibitions ==
- 1999: Pride and Prejudice: Lesbian and Gay London
- 2006: Queer is Here
- 2006–2007: belonging: Voices of London's Refugees
- 2010–2011: London Futures
- 2011–2012: Charles Dickens
- 2012–2013: Doctors, Dissection and Resurrection Men
- 2013: Opening The Olympics
- 2013–2014: The Cheapside Hoard
- 2014–2015: Sherlock Holmes: The Man Who Never Lived And Will Never Die
- 2015–2016: The Crime Museum Uncovered
- 2016–2017: Fire! Fire!
- 2017–2018: The City Is Ours
- 2017: Junk
- 2017: (Un)Common Currency
- 2018: London Nights
- 2018: Fatberg!
- 2018–2019: Disease X: London's Next Epidemic?
- 2018–2019: Votes For Women
- 2019–2020: Beasts of London
- 2019–2020: The Clash: London Calling
- 2020–2021: Dub London: Bassline of a City
- 2022: Grime Stories: From the Corner to the Mainstream
- 2022: Harry Kane: I Want To Play Football

== Other locations ==
=== London Museum Docklands ===
In 2003, the museum opened the Museum in Docklands (later renamed the Museum of London Docklands and then London Museum Docklands) in a 19th-century Grade I listed warehouse near Canary Wharf on the Isle of Dogs. The London Museum Docklands charts the history of London as a port, beginning 2,000 years ago with the Roman trading post set up on the banks of the Thames and following London's expansion into the biggest port the world had ever known. In November 2007, it opened the capital's first permanent gallery examining London's involvement in the transatlantic slave trade, "London, Sugar & Slavery".

=== Museum of London Archaeology ===
Museum of London Archaeology (MOLA) is an archaeology and built heritage practice that was originally part of the Museum of London, but became an independent charity in November 2011, regulated by the Charity Commission for England and Wales. It employs 310 staff and works not just in London, but across the UK and internationally. It is based at Mortimer Wheeler House in Shoreditch.

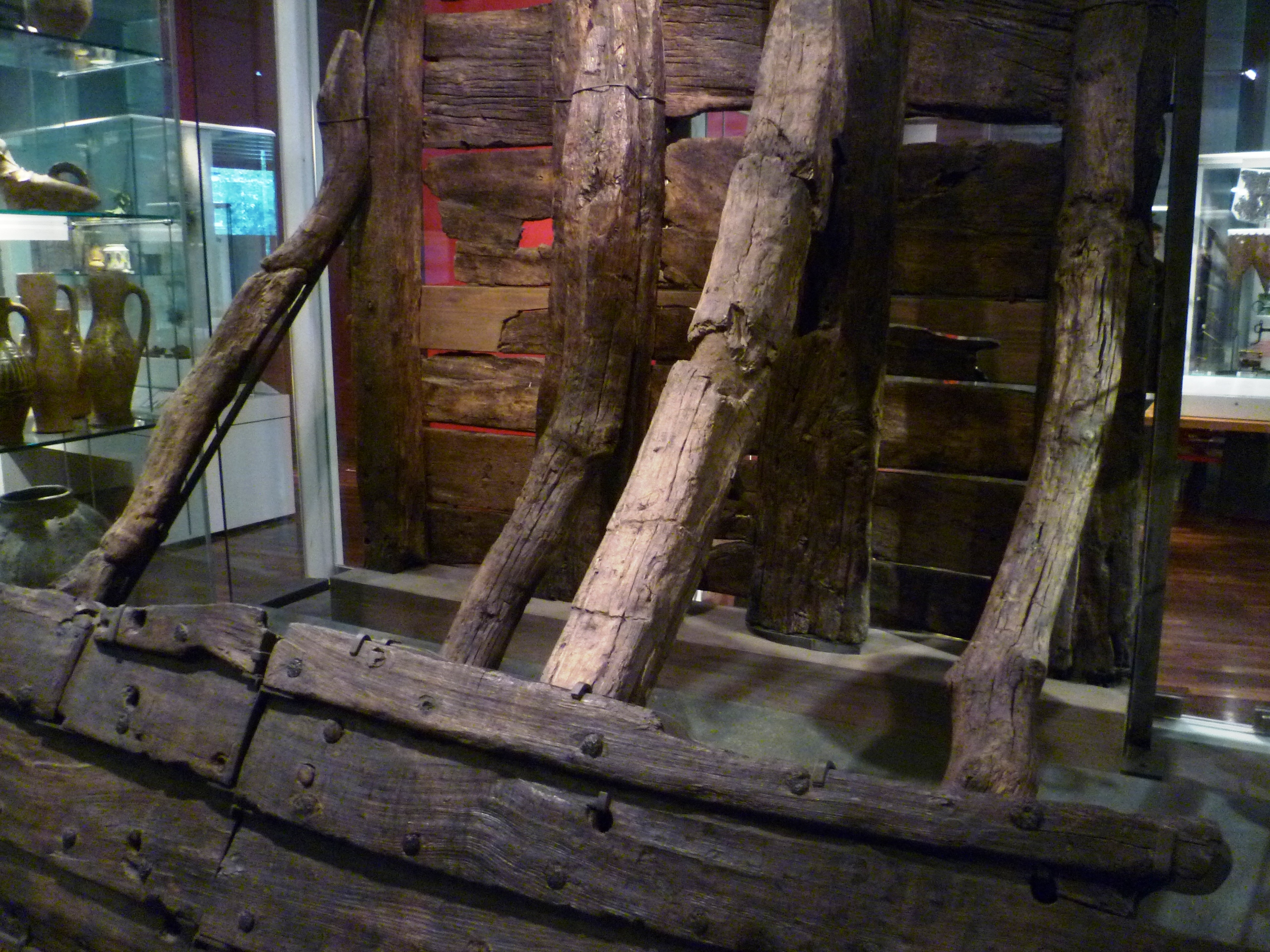
Part of a 13th-century timber wall from the Thames riverbank at Billingsgate, excavated in 1982 and displayed in the medieval galleries at the Museum's Barbican site

== Governance ==
The London Museum and London Museum Docklands are part of the same group. Since 1 April 2008, the museum has been jointly controlled and funded by the City of London Corporation and the Greater London Authority. Prior to this, the museum had been jointly controlled by the City of London and the Department for Culture, Media and Sport. It is headed by a director.

=== List of directors ===
- 1965–1970: Donald Harden (acting)
- 1972–1977: Tom Hume
- 1977–1997: Max Hebditch
- 1997–2002: Simon Thurley
- 2002–2012: Jack Lohman
- 2012–present: Sharon Ament

== See also ==
- Culture of London
- London and Middlesex Archaeological Society
