= Smithfield General Market =

Coordinates: 51.5179°N 0.1048°W

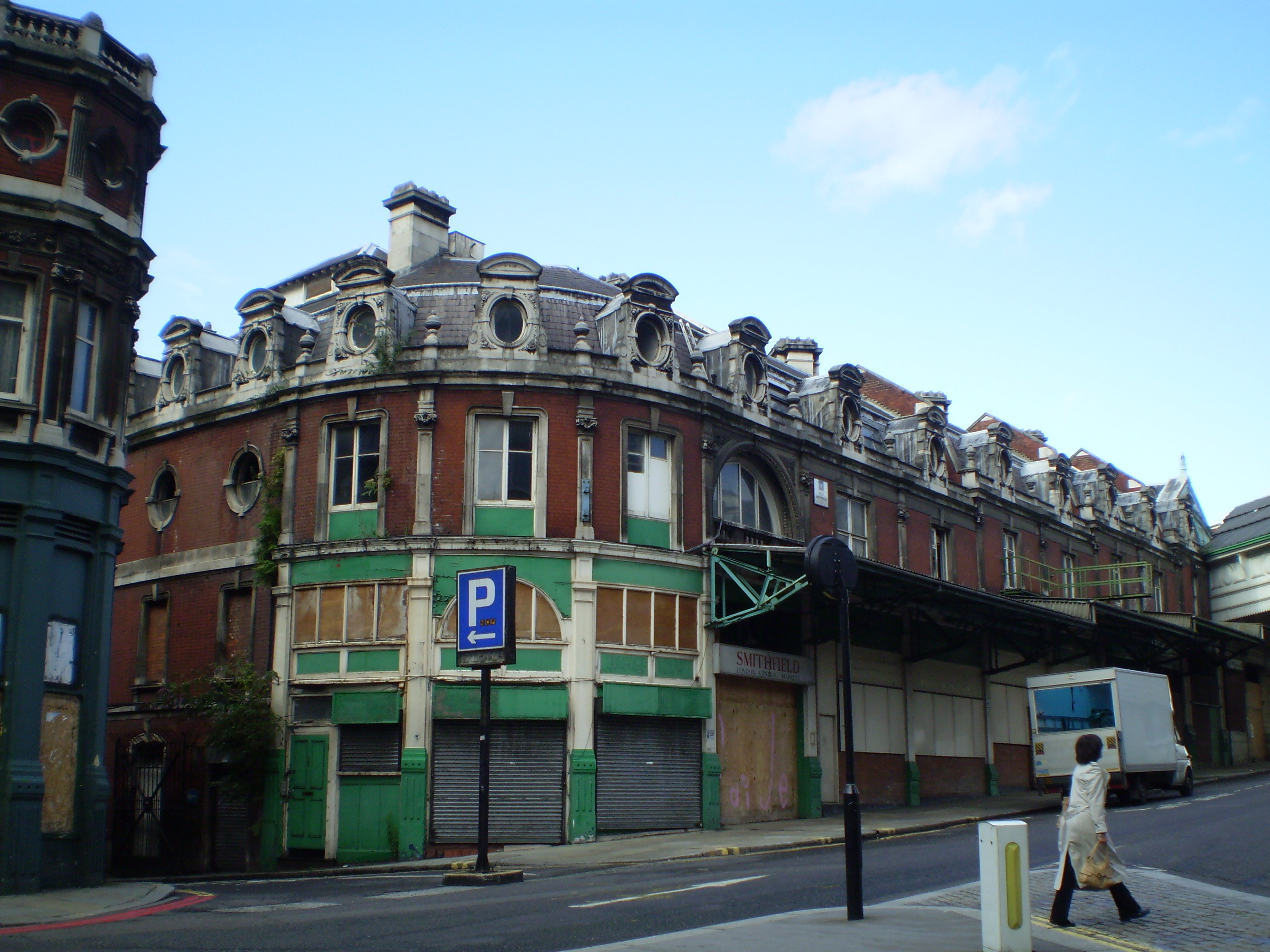
Smithfield General Market in 2007

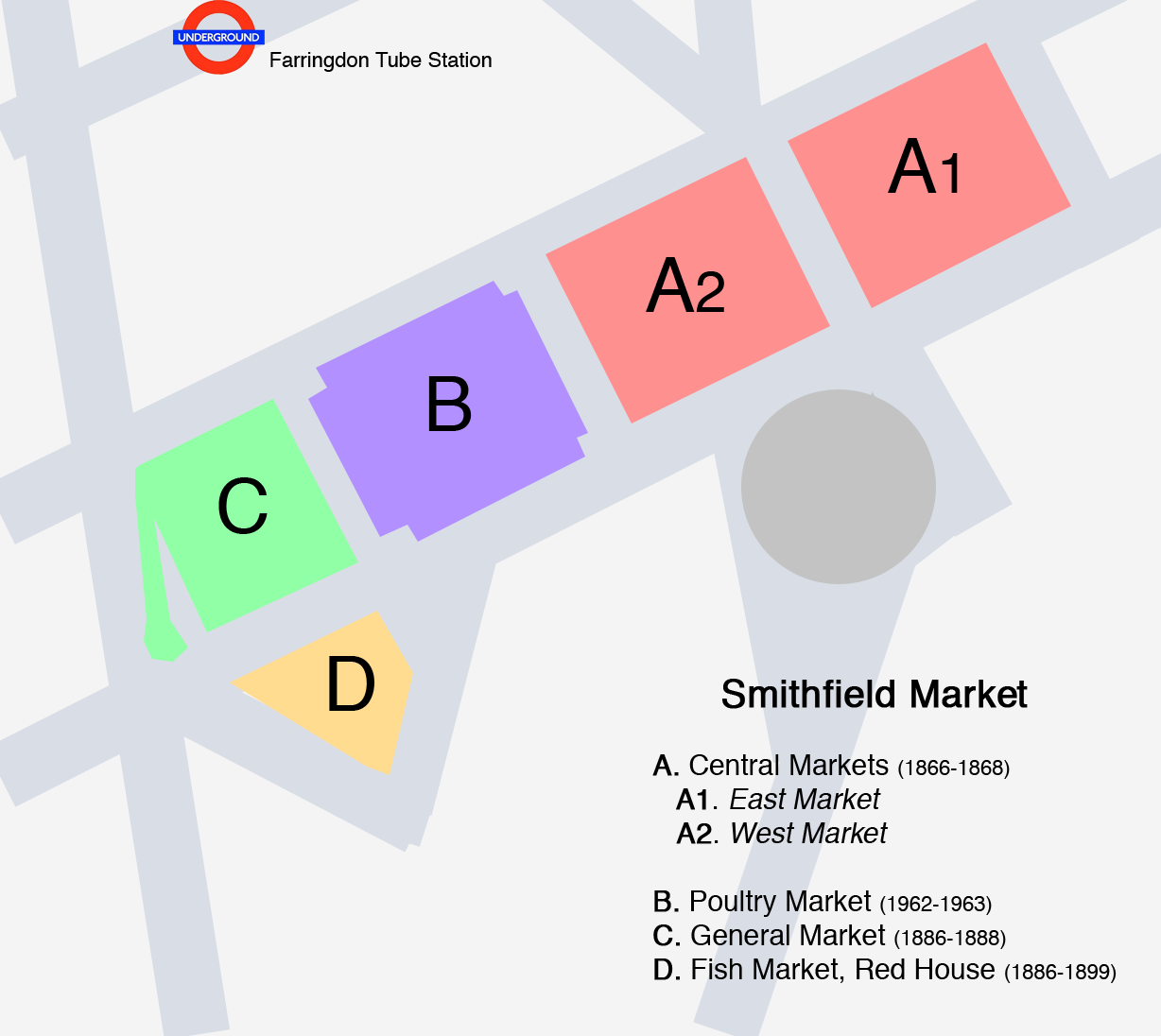
Map of the main buildings of the Smithfield Market complex: the General Market is C (green)

Smithfield General Market is a market hall in the Smithfield District of London, and one of the five buildings of Smithfield Market. It was designed by Horace Jones in the 19th century but was damaged during the Second World War and became disused.

In March 2015, the Museum of London revealed plans to vacate its Barbican site and move into the General Market Building. The cost of the move is estimated to be in the region of £70 million, and the museum is due to reopen at the site by 2026.
