= Rhinebeck panorama =

Panorama of London dated to 1806–7

The Rhinebeck panorama is panoramic view of London dated to 1806–7. The work was found in Rhinebeck, New York in 1941, in the attic of a house, being used to line a barrel of pistols. It was acquired by the Museum of London in 1998.

== Overview ==
The panoramic image shows a bird's eye view – perhaps made with the use of a hot-air balloon – looking west from a position above the middle of the River Thames, approximately at the current location of Tower Bridge, with the view spanning Southwark to the left and the City of London to the right. Ships are depicted on the river in the Pool of London, downstream of London Bridge, with scenes from everyday city life, such as a building on fire in Bermondsey to the left, a funeral at Southwark St John Horsleydown, traffic crossing the bridges over the river, the pagoda at Kew Gardens, Westminster Abbey, the dome of St Paul's Cathedral and the spires of other city churches, shot towers and windmills, the Tower of London where a cannon is being fired, and a kite being flown at Tower Hill. One ship in the third panel is a hulk, with two masts removed, used to receiving men press-ganged by the Royal Navy. Windsor Castle can be seen in the distance.

The work comprises four separate watercolour and pencil panels made by three different artists: one for the ships, a second for the city scenes, and a third for church spires in the distance. The combined image measures 71 centimetres (28 in) by 262 centimetres (103 in). It may have been a study for a larger, uncompleted panoramic painting, to be displayed on a curved wall, but the watercolour may have been exhibited in London in 1809 with other panoramas of European cities.

The panorama was probably taken to the US in 1839 by Robert Havell, Jr., whose father published a similar "Aeronautical View of London" in 1831. The original watercolour was rediscovered in an attic in Rhinebeck, New York in 1940, and sold at Sotheby's on 8 June 1998 for £199,500. It was purchased by the Museum of London, partially funded by an Art Fund grant of £40,000, and also funding from the Heritage Lottery Fund and the Victoria and Albert Museum.

A modern version, with 20th-century buildings added, is displayed in the Rolls Building which houses part of the Royal Courts of Justice on Fetter Lane.
