= Tom Hume (museum director) =

Thomas Andrew Hume CBE (1917–1992) was the first director of the Museum of London.

Born on 21 June 1917, the only son of Thomas Hume of Burnfoot, Oxton and Lillias Dodds, Hume was educated at the Heaton Grammar School in Heaton, Newcastle upon Tyne before attending King's College, Durham University, where he won the Gladstone and Joseph Cowen prizes for academic excellence. Marrying Joyce MacDonald in 1942, he served as a navigator in the Royal Air Force during the Second World War.

Hume's professional career began in 1949 with his appointment as curator of Kirkstall Abbey House Museum in Leeds, a position he retained until 1952, when he moved to the Buckinghamshire County Museum in Aylesbury. His talents were quickly noticed and he became director of the City of Liverpool Museums in 1960, remaining in the position until 1972.

Whilst in Liverpool, Hume was approached to become the first director of the new Museum of London. He moved to London in 1972, overseeing the final development of the site and the installation of the museum's first installations. Before retiring in 1977, Hume was offered the directorship of the British Museum, which he rejected.

During the period from 1977 to his death on 16 June 1992, Hume was an active member of the Museums and Galleries Commission (formerly the Standing Commission on Museums and Galleries) and the Advanced Committee of the London Transport Museum, the president of the North Western Federation of Museums, the vice-president of the International Association of Transport Museums, and chairman of the International Council of Museums' British National Committee. He was also museum consultant to UNESCO, director of Unesco's Museum Exchange Programme and an Honorary Member of the International Council of Museums.

Cultural offices
Preceded by None	Director of the Museum of London; 1972–1977	Succeeded by Max Hebditch
