= List of New York State Historic Markers in Dutchess County, New York =

This is a complete list of New York State Historic Markers in Dutchess County, New York.

== Listings county-wide ==
	Marker name	Image	Date designated	Location	City or Town	Marker text
1	Amenia Union			County Road at Amenia Union.	Amenia, New York	Home Of Dr. Thomas Young, Who Named Amenia, And Vermont; A Revolutionary Patriot, And Friend Of Ethan Allen.
2	Dutchess County			NYS 343, Northeast of Leedsville, at NY-CT Line.	Amenia, New York	Created In 1638, And Named For The Dutchess Of York. The "t" In Original Name Is Still Used.
3	Amenia			US 44, North of Amenia	Amenia, New York	Named From The Latin "amoena," "pleasant To The Eye," By Dr. Thomas Young, Early Settler, Who Also Named Vermont.
4	New York State			NYS 343, Northeast of Leedsville, At NY-CT Line.	Amenia, New York	Explored By Dutch, 1609, Settled By Dutch, 1624;k. Under English Rule After 1664. Named For Duke Of York, Later King James II.
5	Richard Sackett			NYS 22 at South Amenia.	Amenia, New York	First Settler Of Amenia, About 1711, Had Farm Here And Is Buried On Hill To North. He Was Commissioner On Palatine Settlement.
6	Site Of Amenia Seminary			US 44 at Amenia	Amenia, New York	Built In 1835; It Was Directed By The Methodist Church. It Had A High Reputation And Many Noted Graduates.
7	Troutbeck			NYS 343, at Leedsville.	Amenia, New York	Former Home Of Myron B. Benton, Poet-naturalist, Friend Of John Burroughs, Emerson And Thoreau.
8	Uldrick Winegar			County Road 0.5 miles Northwest of Amenia Union.	Amenia, New York	Uldrick Winegar And His Son Capt. Garrett Winegar, Who Came From The East Camp Of The Palatines, Germantown, N.Y. Settled Here In 1724.
9	Red Meeting House			US 44, 0.7 miles North Of Amenia.	Amenia, New York	Red Meeting House "Carmel In Nine Partners," First Church In Amenia, Was Formerly Near Cemetery. George Whitefield, Famous.
10	City Of Beacon			NYS 9d, North of Beacon.	Beacon, New York	Incorporated May 15, 1913 Consolidation Of Mattewan And Fishkill Landing Villages.
11	City Of Beacon			NYS 52, East of Beacon	Beacon, New York	Incorporated May 15, 1913 Consolidation Of Mattewan And Fishkill Landing Villages.
12	City Of Beacon			NYS 9d, South of Beacon	Beacon, New York	Incorporated May 15, 1913 Consolidation Of Mattewan And Fishkill Landing Villages.
13	Fishkill Landing			Willow Street and Verplanck Avenue	Beacon, New York	In 1869 Pop. 1100; Contained 4 Churches, Newspaper Office, Steamboat Landing, 2 Machine Shops, R.R. Station. Steam Ferry To Newburgh. Ferry In 1743.
14	Fishkill Landing			Willow Street and Verplanck Avenue	Beacon, New York	In 1869 Pop. 1100; Contained 4 Churches, Newspaper Office, Steamboat Landing, 2 Machine Shops, R.R. Station. Steam Ferry To Newburgh. Ferry In 1743.
15	Fishkill Landing			Beekman and River Streets	Beacon, New York	One Of Oldest Landings Along Hudson River. During Rev. Supplies For Troops In Newburgh & N.j. From New England Brought Across River.
16	Mattewan			On NYS 9d and NYS 52.	Beacon, New York	In 1860 Pop. 1476, Contained 4 Churches, Machine Works, Clothing And File Factories, And Rubber Shop. Formerly Had Extensive Cotton Mills.
17	Mount Beacon			NYS 9d, at foot of Mount Beacon.	Beacon, New York	On The Summit, 1640 Feet Above Hudson, Was One Of System Of Beacon In The Highlands Planned By Gens. Washington And Clinton.
17	Beekman Furnace			Furnace Road, off of Clove Valley Road.	Beekman, New York	This 48 foot furnace stack was built in 1873 by the Clove Spring Iron Works.
18	Dewitt House			County Road at Frost's Mills.	Clinton, New York	Built 1773 By John Dewitt Captain, Revolutionary War, Member Of Assembly, Sheriff Dutchess Co. And Member Constitutional Convention.
19	Clove Road Camp		1932	NYS 22, North of NYS 55, at Wingdale.	Wingdale, New York	A Mile West Is Philip Hoag House, Built 1750, Where Washington And Troops, En Route From Boston To New York, Encamped In 1776.
20	Dover Stone Church			NYS 22, at Dover Plains.	Dover, New York	A Cavern, With A Waterfall, Refuge Of Sassacus, Pequot Chief, Fleeing From Rout Of His Tribe At New Loudon, Conn. Afterward Killed By Mohawks.
21	Morehouse Tavern			NYS 22, North of NYS 55, at Wingdale.	Dover, New York	Site Of Tavern, On Road From Hartford, Conn., To Fishkill, N.Y. Where Washington, Rochambeau And De Chastellux Stayed.
22	Morehouse Tavern			NYS 52 West of Wicopee.	East Fishkill, New York	House Built In 1740 By Judge Theodorus Van Wyck Occupied 1776-1777 By John Jay Who Here Presided At Provincial Court.
23	Sibyl Ludington			NYS 52 & NYS 216, at Stormville.	East Fishkill, New York	Rode Horseback Over This Road The Night Of April 26, 1777, To Call Out Colonel Ludington's Regiment To Repel British At Danbury, Conn; These accounts, originating from the Ludington family, are questioned by modern scholars.
24	Stormville Village		1935	NYS 52 at Stormville.	East Fishkill, New York	Settled 1730 By Genet, George, And Isaac Storm After Whom Village Was Named. Previous To 1860 Had 20 Houses.
25	Town And County Line			County Road, 1 mile West of Pecksville, at Dutchess-Putnam County Line.	East Fishkill, New York	East Fishkill, Dutchess Co. Formed From Fishkill 1849. Kent, Putnam Co. Formed As Frederickstown 1788. Changed To Frederick 1795, Kent 1817.
26	Town And County Line			NYS 52, 0.5 miles South of Pecksville, at Dutchess-Putnam County Line.	East Fishkill, New York	East Fishkill, Dutchess Co. Formed From Fishkill 1849. Kent, Putnam Co. Formed As Frederickstown 1788. Changed To Frederick 1795, Kent 1817.
27	Town Line			NYS 52, Wicopee.	East Fishkill, New York	East Fishkill Formed From Fishkill 1849. Fishkill Formed 1788. Part Of La Grange Off 1821 And East Fishkill 1849. Part Of Philipstown Annexed 1806.
28	Town Line			NYS 52, Wicopee.	East Fishkill, New York	East Fishkill Formed From Fishkill 1849. Fishkill Formed 1788. Part Of La Grange Off 1821 And East Fishkill 1849. Part Of Philipstown Annexed 1806.
29	Town Line			NYS 216, 1 mile East of Stormville.	East Fishkill, New York	East Fishkill Formed From Fishkill 1849. Beekman Formed As Town 1788. Part Of Lagrange Off In 1821: And Part Of Union Vale In 1827.
30	Battery			US 9, 1/8 mile North of Dutchess-Putnam County Line.	Fishkill, New York	On This Hill, During The American Revolution, Was A Battery For The Defense Of "the Gorge Of The Mountains," Fishkill Clove.
31	Colonel John Brinckerhoff			NYS 82, East of Brinckerhoff.	Fishkill, New York	Built 1738 By Colonel John Brinckerhoff Washington's Headquarters While Army Was In Fishkill.
32	Dutchess County			US 9, at Dutchess-Putnam County Line.	Fishkill, New York	Created In 1683 And Named For The Dutchess Of York. The "t" In Original Name Is Still Used.
33	Enoch Crosby			NYS 52, at Fishkill.	Fishkill, New York	American Spy, Taken With Recruits For British Army, Confined Here After Mock Trial By Committee Of Safety Was Allowed To Escape.
34	Home Of Hendrick Kip			Southwest of NYS 52, Nr. Glenham.	Fishkill, New York	Built 1753. Fishkill Headquarters Of Baron Von Steuben About 1777. Gen. Washington And Count Pulaski Visited Here.
35	Site Of Fishkill Tea Party			NYS 52, at Brinckerhoff.	Fishkill, New York	Aug. 26, 1776, 100 Women Forced Abram Brinckerhoff Storekeeper, To Sell Them Tea At Lawful Price Of Six Shillings Per Pound.
36	Star Mills			South of NYS 52, in Brinckerhoff.	Fishkill, New York	Built By Abram Brinckerhoff. Burned 1777. Rebuilt By Order Of Gen. Washington While His Soldiers Encamped At Fishkill. Later Demolished.
37	Verplanck House			NYS 9d, 0.5 mile North of Beacon.	Fishkill, New York	Built 1740, By Gulian Verplanck, Burned 1931. Headquarters Baron Steuben 1762. Society Of Cincinnati Organized There In 1783.
38	Warton House			US 9, 0.5 mile South of Fishkill.	Fishkill, New York	Made Famous By Cooper's Novel, "The Spy" Headquarters Of Gen. Putnam In Revolution.
39	Washington's Sword			NYS 52, at Glenham.	Fishkill, New York	Was Forged Or Repaired Near Here By John Bailey. The Sword Is Now In Smithsonian Museum, Washington, D.C.
40	Dutch Church			NYS 52, at Fishkill.	Fishkill, New York	Reformed Church Of Fishkill Organized 1716, Built 1725, Occupied 1776 By New York Provincial Congress, Also Prison During Revolution.
41	Trinity Church			NYS 52 at Fishkill.	Fishkill, New York	Organized By Rev. Samuel Seabury 1756, Built 1760. Provincial Congress Met Here Sept. 1776. Used As Hospital During Revolution.
42	James K. Paulding House			US 9, 2 miles North of Hyde Park.	Hyde Park, New York	Site Of James K. Paulding House, 1841-1860 Paulding Was A Distinguished Author, Collaborated With Washington Irving. Was Sec'y Of Navy Under Van Buren.
43	St. James Church			US 9, 1 mile North of Hyde Park.	Hyde Park, New York	Site Erected 1844. Attended By Franklin D. Roosevelt, 32d President Of The United States, And His Family.
44	Oswego		1935	NYS 82, at Moore's Mills; intersection of NYS 82 and Oswego Rd.	La Grange, New York	Old Name Of Community One Mile East, With Meeting House Of Society Of Friends, 18th Century Center For A Wide Neighborhood.
45	Indian Burial Ground			County Road, West of Jackson Corners.	Milan, New York	Chief Crow And Other Mohican Shacomecos Of Moravian Faith Buried Here. Last Burial About 1850.
46	Colonial Inn			At Jackson Corners.	Milan, New York	Built About 1773 Stage Inn, Doctor's Office, Hotel, Store, Post Office Of Jackson Corners.
47	Fulton Homestead			County Road, between Upper Red Hook and Jackson Corners.	Milan, New York	John Fulton, First Owner. Deed Recorded Oct. 12, 1795 Has Always Been In Possession Of The Fulton Family. In Fulton Name Until 1933.
48	Nobletown Road			County Road, West of Jackson Corners.	Milan, New York	Running From Post Road In Livingston, Through Gallatin, Ancram, State Line, Nobletown, To Barrington, N.H. In Use Before 1798.
49	Bryan Burying Ground			NYS 82, North of Shekomeko.	North East, New York	Burial ground. Oldest stone 1825.
50	Coleman's Station Burying Ground			0.5 mile East of US 44, at Coleman's Station.	North East, New York	Burial ground. Oldest stone 1749.
51	Irondale Cemetery			NYS 22, at Millerton.	North East, New York	Irondale, Millerton. Town Of North East. Oldest stone 1818.hip, Litchfield.
52	North East Center Burying Ground			US 44, at North East Center	North East, New York	Burial ground. Oldest stone marked 1801.
53	Spencer's Corners Burying Ground			County Road, 1.5 miles East of NYS 22	North East, New York	Burying ground belonged To Baptist Church. Land donated here for church & graveyard By Rev. Simon Dakin, 1776. Oldest Stone 1701.
54	Spencer's Corners			County Road, 1.5 miles East of Irondale.	North East, New York	North East Post Office May 1, 1773, First Baptist Covenant Meeting In North East Held At Home Of Rev. Simon Dakin, Near Here.
55	Town, County, & State Line			US 44, at NY-CT Line	North East, New York	North East Township, Dutchess County, New York State; Salisbury Township, Litchfield County, Connecticut.
56	Town, County, & State Line			NYS 361, at NY-CT Line	North East, New York	North East Township, Dutchess County, New York State; Salisbury Township, Litchfield County, Connecticut.
57	Dutchess County			NYS 22, 3 miles South of Pawling	Pawling, New York	Created In 1683 And Named For The Dutchess Of York. The "t" In Original Name Is Still Used.
58	John L. Worden			NYS 22, 100 yards North of NYS 55	Pawling, New York	Commander Of The Monitor, Against The Confederate Ram, Merrimac, Hampton Roads, Mar.9, 1862; Rear Admiral, U.s.n. Is Buried Here.
59	Kane House			NYS 22, at Pawling	Pawling, New York	Occupied By Gen. Washington, Sep.-Nov., 1778 After The Battle Of Monmouth, N.J. When He Was Planning An Advance Upon New York City.
60	West Pine Plains Christian Church			NYS 199, 2 Mis. W. Of Pine Plains	Pine Plains, New York	West Pine Plains Dedicated 1859 By Rev. Ali Fay Of Yellow Springs, Ohio. New Storehouse For Farm Machinery And Also Garage.
61	Hubbell Spring			NYS 199, .5 Mi. W. Of Pine Plains	Pine Plains, New York	Named For Mr. Hubbell Who Built Cabin Nearby About 1760. Watering Through Here Since That Date.
62	Mount Ross			Co. Rd., At Mount Ross	Pine Plains, New York	Named For Captain Thomas Ross, Who Was Called "Baron Ross" Died August, 1762.
63	Old Turnpike			NYS 199, .5 Mi. E. Of Pine Plains	Pine Plains, New York	Rhinebeck-Salisbury Turnpike. Legislative Act Passed April 2, 1802.
64	Pine Plains			NYS 82, 4 Mis. Se Of Pine Plains	Pine Plains, New York	Northeast Line Ine Plains Organized 1823. Northeast Formed 1788 And Included Milan And Pine Plains. Milan Taken Off In 1818.
65	Pine Plains			NYS 199, At Pine Plains-north East Line	Pine Plains, New York	Northeast Line Pine Plains Organized 1823. Northeast Formed 1788 And Included Milan And Pine Plains. Milan Taken Off In 1818.
66	Pine Plains-Stanford Line			NYS 82 A, 1 Mi, N. Of Attlebury, At Pine Plains-Stanford Line	Pine Plains, New York	Pine Plains Organized 1823. Part Of Northeast 1788 And Little Nine Partners 1706. Stanford Organized 1793. Part Of Washington 1788 And Great Nine Partners 1697.
67	Scythe Works Site			NYS 199, .5 Mi. W. Of Hammerton	Pine Plains, New York	Stone From Here Used In Basement Walls Of Addition To Presbyterian Church; Also For Foundations In Evergreen Cemetery.
68	Site Of Dibble-Booth House			NYS 199, W. Of Pine Plains	Pine Plains, New York	Built About 1728. Repaired Before 1775 And Top Story Added. J. Lewis, Storekeeper, 1st Occupant. Indian Trading Post And Store. Torn Down 1878.
69	Site Of Old Tavern			SE Corner Main And Church Sts. In Pine Plains	Pine Plains, New York	Log House Tavern Inn 1798, Dr. Asahel Haskins, Prop. Hotel Built 1804 By F. & E. Dibblee, C. Ketterer Owner Enlarged Hotel 1872 & 1882.
70	Seymour Smith Academy			Academy And Smith Sts., In Pine Plains	Pine Plains, New York	Site Of Seymour Smith Academy Opened 1879: Leased 1896, As Union Free School. Rev. A. Mattice, A.m. Only Principal.
71	Grinding Works			NYS 82, 3 Mis. Se Of Pine Plains	Pine Plains, New York	Site Of Grinding Works Founded By Col. Silas Harris About 1832.
72	Old Red Church			NYS 199, 1 Mi. W. Of NYS 82	Pine Plains, New York	Site Of Red Church Built By German Reformers 1772 On Pulver Farm; Torn Down 1826; Known As The Old Red Church.
73	Union Library			SW Corner Main And Church Sts. In Pine Plains.	Pine Plains, New York	Union Library Of Pine Plains Organized 1798. Ebenezer Baldwin First Librarian. First Public Library In Town Of North East.
74	Matthew Vassar			NE Corner Main & Vassar Sts.	Poughkeepsie, New York	Founder Of Vassar College, Lived In House On This Site For Many Years. Now Site Of Vassar Bros. Home.
75	Nelson House			Market St. At Nelson House	Poughkeepsie, New York	On This Site 1777-1807 Stephen Hendrickson's Inn; 1807-1876, The Forbus House; Since 1876, The Nelson House.
76	Poughkeepsie			NYS 376, Se Of Poughkeepsie	Poughkeepsie, New York	First Settlers In 1687. New York State Capital, 1778-1783. Constitution Of The United States Ratified Here By New York, July 26, 1788.
77	Poughkeepsie			US 9 G, N. Of Poughkeepsie	Poughkeepsie, New York	First Settlers In 1687. New York State Capital, 1778-1783. Constitution Of The United States Ratified Here By New York, July 26, 1788.
78	Poughkeepsie			US 9, S. Of Poughkeepsie	Poughkeepsie, New York	First Settlers In 1687. New York State Capital, 1778-1783. Constitution Of The United States Ratified Here By New York, July 26, 1788.
79	Smith Thompson			US 9, 75 Yds. N. Of City Line	Poughkeepsie, New York	Site Of Smith Thompson Country Home Thompson Was Secretary Of Navy, 1818-1822 And Justice Of The Supreme Court Of U.s., 1833-1843.
80	The Glebe House			635 Main St.	Poughkeepsie, New York	Built In 1767 By Members Of The Church Of England In Dutchess County For Their Minister.
81	Val Kill			Mill St. At Bridge	Poughkeepsie, New York	Dutch Name For "Stream of Falls" "Pondanickrien" Is The Indian Name Meaning "Crooked Place".
82	1776 Shipyard			NE Corner Livingston And Prospect Sts.	Poughkeepsie, New York	On Shore Line Of River Was A Continental Shipyard Where Frigates Congress And Montgomery Were Built To Defend The Hudson River
83	George Clinton			Shaefe Rd., At N.y. Trap Rock Co.	Poughkeepsie, New York	Entrance To Estate Owned And Occupied 1804-1812 By George Clinton Then Vice President Of The United States.
84	Speck Zyn Kill			US 9, At Speckenkill Rd.	Poughkeepsie, New York	Dutch For "speck, His Stream". Later Called Speck'n Kill And Speckenkill. Speck, An Indian, Owed This Land.
85	Zephaniah Platt			Overlook Rd., 1 Mi. From NYS 55	Poughkeepsie, New York	County Court Judge, Colonel Of Militia, Member Council Of Safety, Constitutional Convention, Delegate State Senate Lived Here 1762-1798.
86	David Van Ness			W. Market & Phillips Sts., In Red Hook	Red Hook, New York	Built Brick House Here Before 1797. Was Captain During Revolution, Gen. Of State Militia, State Senator And Presidential Elector 1812.
87	Dutchess County			US 9, .5 Mi. N. Of Kerleys Corners	Red Hook, New York	Created In 1683 And Named For The Dutchess Of York. The "t" In Original Name Is Still Used.
88	Montgomery Place			Co. Rd., .5 Mi. Sw Of Annandale-on-hudson	Red Hook, New York	Home Of Janet Livingston, Widow Of General Richard Montgomery. Killed In Quebec 1775; And Of Hon. Edw. Livingston, 1764-1836.
89	Old Red Brick Tavern			E. Of US 9, In Upper Red Hook	Red Hook, New York	Known In 1789 As The Thomas House Headquarters In 1777 Of General Putnam.
90	Brig. Gen. John A. Quitman			US 9, 2 Mis. N. Of Rhinebeck	Rhinebeck, New York	Birthplace Of Brig. Gen. John A. Quitman Sept. 1, 1799-July 17, 1858 Hero Of Mexican War Senator, Chancellor, Judge Governor Of Mississippi
91	Bogardus Land			US 9, At Rhinebeck P.o.	Rhinebeck, New York	Training Ground Of Revolutionary Troops. Formerly Belonged To William Traphagen, Founder Of Village Of Rhinebeck.
92	Gen. Richard Montgomery			Livingston St., Rhinebeck	Rhinebeck, New York	House Occupied By Gen. Richard Montgomery When He Took Command Of The Northern Forces 1775.
93	John Benner House			US 9, 2 Mis. S. Of Rhinebeck	Rhinebeck, New York	Held The First Methodist Church Services In The Town. Conducted By The Rev. Freeborn Garretson, 1791-1792.
94	Landsman's Kill			US 9, At Br. In Rhinebeck	Rhinebeck, New York	Whose Waters Operated The Mills Of Schuyler, Montgomery, Morgan Lewis Livingston And Many Other.
95	Long Dock			NYS 308, 1 Mi. W. Of Rhinebeck	Rhinebeck, New York	Landing For Ferry Chartered 1752, Connecting The Ulster As Salisbury Pike On The East With The Ulster And Delaware On The West.
96	Old Rhinebeck			US 9, 2 Mis. N. Of Rhinebeck	Rhinebeck, New York	Original Location Of The Village Of Rhinebeck Site Of Oldest Church In Northern Precinct Of Dutchess County.
97	Peter Pultz' Tavern			NYS 308, E. Of Mulberry St., In Rhinebeck	Rhinebeck, New York	Built About 1800 Known Also As "Bowery House" Was Social Center Of Community; Its Courtroom, Theater & Ballroom Was Hdqts. "Yellow Bird" Stage Line.
98	Kip-Beekman-Heermance House			NYS 308, .5 Mi. E. Of Rhinecliff	Rhinebeck, New York	Ruins Of The Kip-Beekman-Heermance House Built 1700 By Hendrick Kip, Patentee. Home Of Col. Henry Beekman, Jr. Later Of His Grandson Col. Henry B. Livingston Of The Rev. Army.
99	Gasmere			US 9, 2 Mis. S. Of Rhinebeck	Rhinebeck, New York	Westward On The Left (right) Gasmere-birthplace-W.A. Duer Once President Of Columbia Col. On The Right Beyond - Ellerslie Home Of Levi P. Morton, Gov. Of N.Y. & Vice Pres. Of U.S.
100	White Corner			NW Corner Mill & W. Market Sts. In Rhinebeck	Rhinebeck, New York	Built In 1816 By Christian Schell. Once The Commercial And Financial Center Of The Community.
101	Mesier Park			NYS 9d, At Wappingers Falls	Wappinger, New York	Pre-Revolutionary House Home Of Mesier Family From 1777 To 1890 Acquired By Village 1891.
102	Jacob Willetts			NYS 343, 1/4 Mi. E. Of Millbrook; in front of Millbrook Golf Club	Washington, New York	Jacob Willetts Deborah Willetts Widely Known Educators Lived Here In Early 19th Century.
103	Meeting House			NYS 343, .5 Mi. E. Of Millbrook	Washington, New York	Built In 1780 By The Nine Partners Meeting Of The Society Of Friends
104	Nine Partners School			NYS 343, 3/4 Mi. E. Of Millbrook	Washington, New York	On This Site, 1796-1863, Influential In Education Famous For Its Teachers And Pupils
105	Home Site of Hall-Christie Family			Clove Rd, 0.6 miles north of intersection of Clove, Brugzul, and Wingdale Mountain roads	Union Vale, New York	Home Site of the Hall-Christie Family, Settled in the Clove, Mid 1700
106	Freight House			Verbank town green, off Rt. 82 near Union Vale fire station	Verbank, New York	Milk, mail, fuel, people from 1877-1905, rode this railroad: Newburgh - Dutchess - Connecticut until 1938. Central New England RR served Verbank P.O. & Station
107	Steel Works		2015	Old NY 22 at intersection of Dutchess County Rts. 3 and 81 in Wassaic.	Wassaic, New York	Steelworks. Site of Mill owned by James Read ca. 1775. Produced steel to meet needs of Continental Army During Revolutionary War. William C. Pomeroy Foundation.
108	Poughkeepsie Railroad Bridge		2019	East end of Walkway Over the Hudson.	Poughkeepsie, New York	Poughkeepsie Railroad Bridge has been placed on the National Register of Historic places in 1979 by the United States Department of the Interior. William C. Pomeroy Foundation.
109	Memorial Trees			Pawling center; east side of RR tracks, just south of train station.	Pawling, New York	Dedicated May 4, 1945 to honor town of Pawling men who gave their lives in the service of their country during World War II. (Marker Donated Am. Leg. Aux.)
110	Cole's Mill			Old Rt. 55, at Edward R. Murrow memorial park.	Pawling, New York	Cole's Mill. Founded 1842 by Emery Cole. Ruins 870 ft. west produced flour, feed & grain. Wagonmaking shop added. Run by son, Albert S. Cole. (Donated by Mr & Mrs Robert Williams)
111	West Mountain Mission		1989	Old Rt. 55, just north of Rt. 55 at entrance to Nuclear Lake trail.	Poughquag, New York	The West Mountain Mission. 1892-1950 est. by A.C. Burdick for education, charitable & religious needs. Neighborhood house built 1905. Harry Lynke, architect, Franklyn Mulkins builder. (The West Mountain Mission 1989)
112	Pawling Beekman Turnpike			Old Rt. 55, just north of Rt. 55 near entrance to Nuclear Lake trail.	Poughquag, New York	Pawling Beekman Turnpike. Inc 1824. 4 mile toll road between Nathan Millers and Joseph Arnolds Commerce. Opened to POK. Abandoned 1906. (Donated by Mr & Mrs Ji Aron)
113	Methodist Church			Dutcher Avenue (County Rt. 69), just off of Main Street (Old Rt. 55).	Pawling, New York	Methodist Church. First church built in 1809 South Road; second church in 1854 on Main Street. This church erected in 1864. Additions in 1928 and 1960.
114	Historic Trinity Methodist Church		1973	6 Cross Road	Lagrangeville, NY	Historic Trinity Methodist Church. Constructed early 1800's at Potter's Corners. Rebuilt at present site in 1863. Parish Hall completed in 1958.

== See also ==
- List of New York State Historic Markers
- National Register of Historic Places listings in New York
- List of National Historic Landmarks in New York
