= List of crossings of Fishkill Creek =

This is a list of crossings of Fishkill Creek, a tributary of the Hudson River in Dutchess County, New York, USA.

== Crossings ==
Crossing	Carries	Location	Coordinates
	Metro-North Hudson Line	Beacon	41°29′5″N 73°58′53″W
Tioronda Bridge	South Avenue	Beacon	41°29′19″N 73°58′28″W
	NY 9D (Wolcott Avenue)	Beacon	41°29′52″N 73°58′0″W
	Churchill Street	Beacon	41°30′2″N 73°57′48″W
	East Main Street	Beacon	41°30′8″N 73°57′42″W
	Metro-North Beacon Line	Town of Fishkill	41°30′57″N 73°56′27″W
	Washington Avenue	Town of Fishkill	41°31′1″N 73°55′58″W
	Beacon Line	Town of Fishkill	41°30′57″N 73°55′55″W
	I-84	Town of Fishkill	41°31′23″N 73°54′29″W
	US 9	Town of Fishkill	41°31′55″N 73°53′42″W
	NY 52	Town of Fishkill	41°32′33″N 73°51′57″W
	CR 31 (Palen Road)	East Fishkill	41°34′13″N 73°49′18″W
	NY 376	East Fishkill	41°34′17″N 73°48′24″W
	Beacon Line	East Fishkill	41°34′45″N 73°47′54″W
	Carol Drive	East Fishkill	41°34′54″N 73°47′39″W
	Carpenter Road	East Fishkill	41°35′18″N 73°47′15″W
	Taconic State Parkway	East Fishkill	41°35′20″N 73°45′56″W
	Phillips Road	East Fishkill	41°35′8″N 73°44′44″W
	CR 8 (Green Haven Road)	Beekman	41°36′13″N 73°43′6″W
	CR 7 (Beekman–Poughquag Road)	Beekman	41°36′41″N 73°42′36″W
	CR 9 (Beekman Road)	Beekman	41°37′38″N 73°41′56″W
	NY 55	Beekman	41°37′45″N 73°41′52″W
	Dorn Road	Beekman	41°38′13″N 73°41′41″W
	CR 21 (Bruzgul Road)	Union Vale	41°39′13″N 73°41′46″W
	CR 21 (Bruzgul Road)	Union Vale	41°39′24″N 73°41′14″W
	CR 21 (Bruzgul Road)	Union Vale	41°39′25″N 73°41′9″W
	Private farm road	Union Vale	41°39′55″N 73°40′43″W
	Cutler Lane	Union Vale	41°40′8″N 73°40′37″W
	West Clove Mountain Road	Union Vale	41°40′23″N 73°40′33″W
