= 150th New York Infantry Regiment =

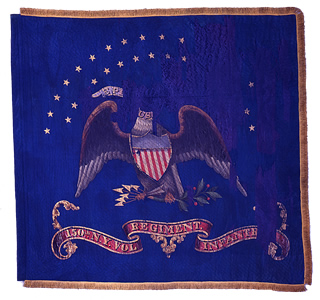
- Regimental colors of the 150th New York Infantry
- Active: October 10, 1862, to June 8, 1865
- Country: United States of America
- Allegiance: United States Army
- Branch: Infantry
- Type: Regiment
- Size: 1,526 men (total)
- Part of: VIII Corps; XII Corps; XX Corps
- Nickname: Dutchess County Regiment
- Engagements: Battle of Gettysburg; Atlanta campaign: Battle of Resaca; Battle of Adairsville; Battle of Dallas; Battle of Kennesaw Mountain; Battle of Peachtree Creek; Siege of Atlanta; March to the sea Carolinas campaign: Battle of Averasborough; Battle of Bentonville

Commanders
- Notable commanders: Col. John H. Ketcham; Col. Alfred B. Smith

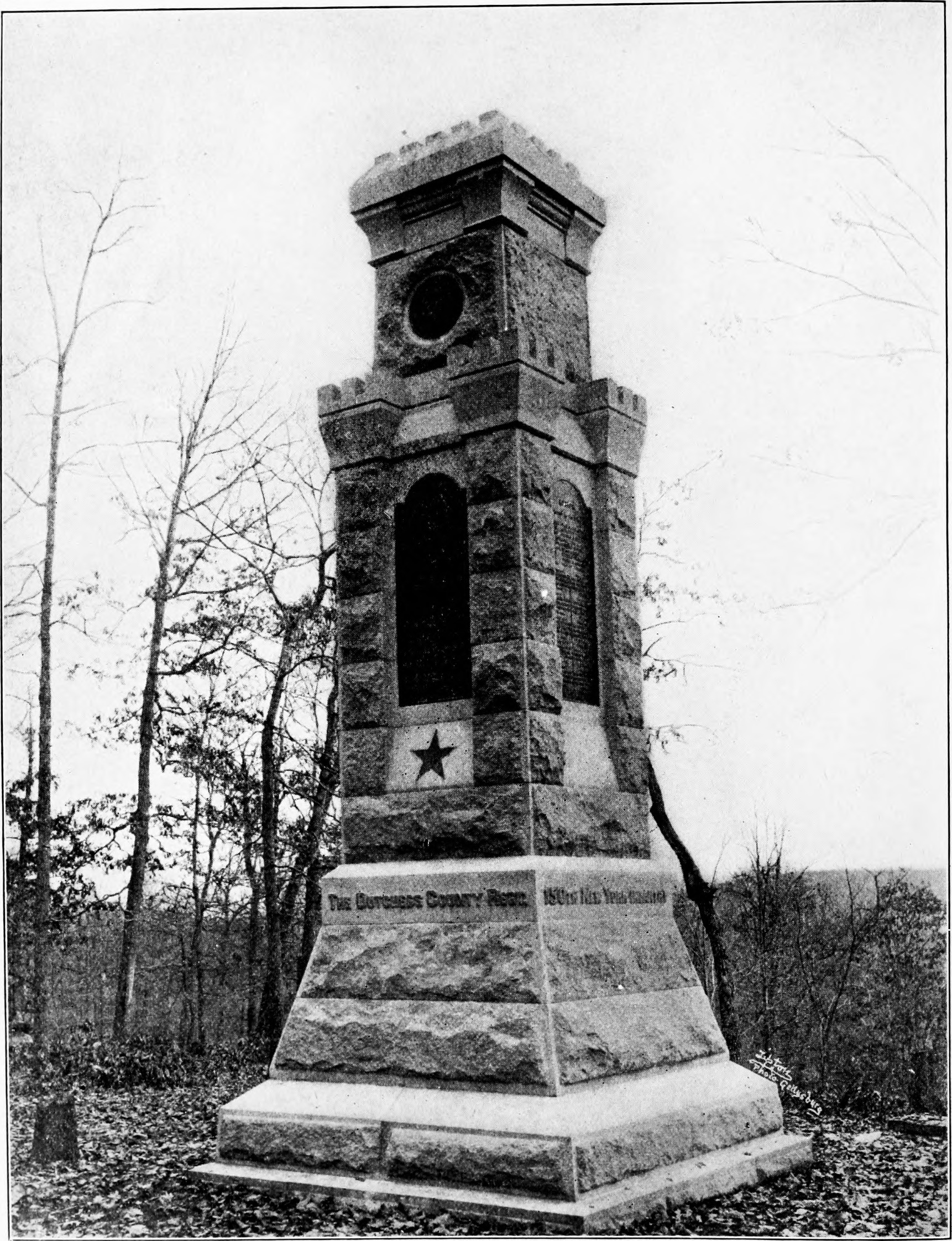
Monument to the 150th Volunteer Infantry, designed by George E. Bissel, 1889

The 150th New York Infantry Regiment was an infantry regiment in the Union Army during the American Civil War. It was mustered in October 10, 1862, and mustered out June 8, 1865.

== Recruiting areas ==
- A Company: Poughkeepsie, Amenia, Washington, and Pleasant Valley
- B Company: Poughkeepsie
- C Company: Clinton, Stanford, Pleasant Valley, Poughkeepsie, and Washington
- D Company: Hyde Park, Pine Plains, North East, Poughkeepsie, and Rhinebeck
- E Company: Dover, Pawling, and Poughkeepsie
- F Company: Poughkeepsie, Rhinebeck, Red Hook, and Milan
- G Company: Poughkeepsie, Beekman, Union Vale, and Fishkill
- H Company: Poughkeepsie, Hyde Park, and Clinton
- I Company: Poughkeepsie, Stanford, LaGrange, Amenia, and Union Vale
- K Company: Rhinebeck, Poughkeepsie, and Fishkill

== Field officers ==
- Colonels: John H. Ketcham, Alfred B. Smith
- Lieutenant Colonels: Charles G. Bartlett, Alfred B. Smith, Joseph H. Cogswell
- Majors: Alfred B. Smith, Joseph H. Cogswell, Henry A. Gildersleeve

== Battle record ==
- Gettysburg campaign
- Atlanta campaign
  - Battle of Resaca
  - Battle of Adairsville
  - Battle of Dallas
  - Battle of Kennesaw Mountain
  - Battle of Peachtree Creek
  - Siege of Atlanta
- March to the sea
- Carolinas campaign
  - Battle of Averasboro
  - Battle of Bentonville

== Casualties ==
The regiment sustained 41 officers and men killed and mortally wounded, 116 wounded but recovered, and 40 missing or captured, for a total of 207 casualties.
