= Verbank, New York =

Hamlet in New York, United States

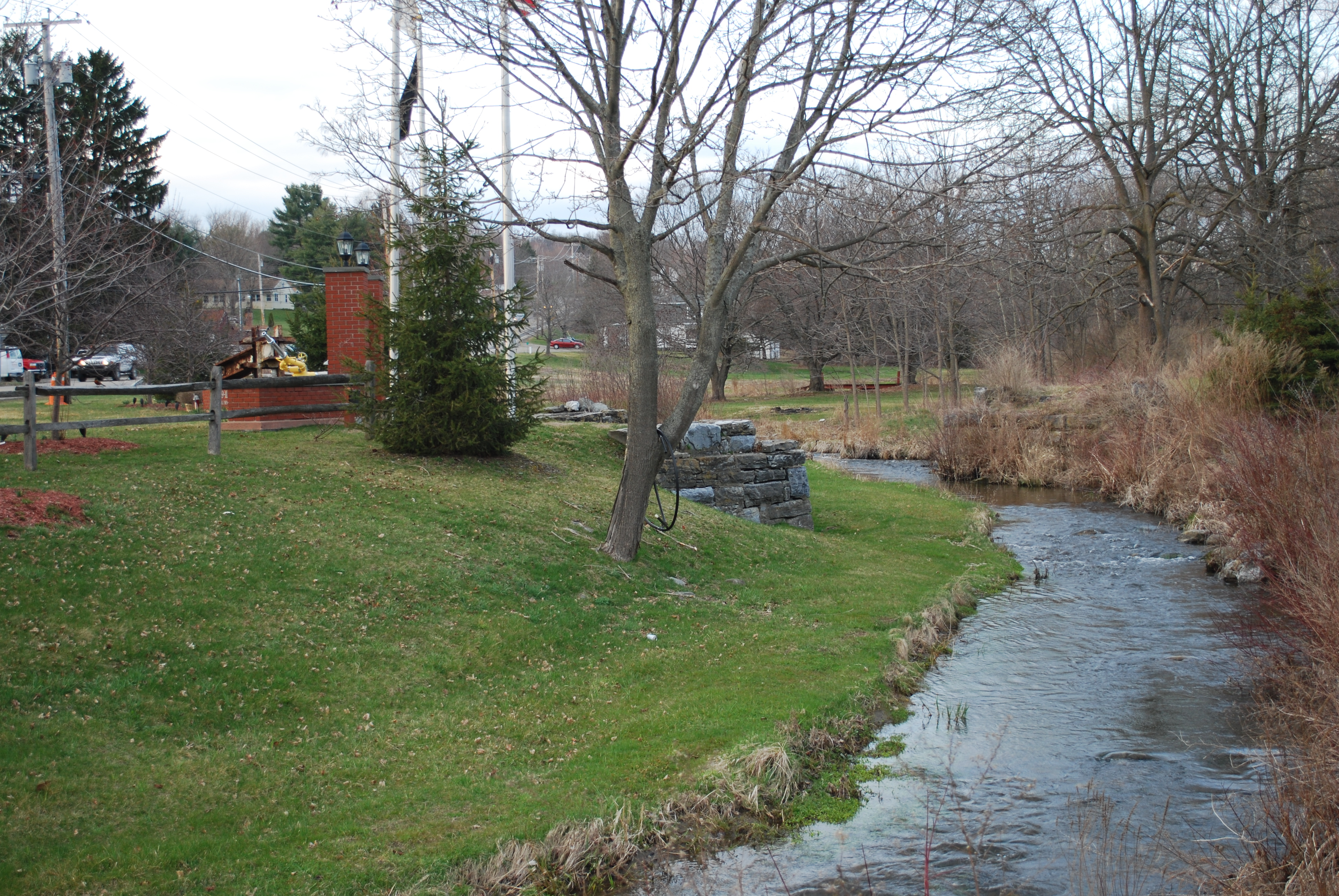
Sprout Creek in the hamlet of Verbank

Verbank is a hamlet in the town of Union Vale in Dutchess County, New York, United States. Verbank is served by a post office with the ZIP code of 12585; the ZCTA for ZIP Code 12585 had a population of 956 at the 2000 census.

Verbank is home to Camp Young Judaea Sprout Lake, which was established in 1976 as a camp for children grades 2–8, focused on Zionist and Jewish education. The camp was formerly a cardiac support summer camp. The Verbank Hunting And Fishing Club, on Verbank Club Road, was created in 1928. The Verbank United Methodist Church is located at the junction of County Route 9 and New York State Route 82. The Dutchess and Columbia Railroad was chartered in 1866 to build a line from Fishkill on the Hudson River, northeast and north to the New York and Harlem Railroad at Craryville. On the railroad, a railroad station, the church, a post office, and two stores existed in the area that was known as Verbank Station. In its early years, Verbank was home to two gristmills and a paper mill.

== Demographics ==
As of the census of 2000, there were 956 people, 326 households, and 245 families residing in the ZCTA for ZIP Code 12585. The racial makeup of the ZCTA was 93.4% White, 2.9% Black or African American, 0.1% Native American, 2.0% Asian, 0.05% Pacific Islander, 5.29% from other races, and 0.9% from two or more races. Hispanic or Latino of any race were 3.3% of the population.

There were 326 households, out of which 40.5% had children under the age of 18 living with them, 67.8% were married couples living together, 4.6% had a female householder with no husband present, and 24.8% were non-families. 19.9% of all households were made up of one resident and 8.3% had someone living alone who was 65 years of age or older. The average household size was 2.89 people and the average family size was 3.37.

In the ZCTA the population was spread out, with 6.8% under the age of 5, 8.1% from 5 to 9, 10.0% from 10 to 14, 5.6% from 15 to 19, 3.3% from 20 to 24, 10.6% between 25 and 34, 22.2% between 35 and 44, 14.4% from 45 to 54, 4.5% from 55 to 59, 4.5% from 60 to 64, and 9.5% ages 65 or older. The median age was 37.5 years.

The median income for a household in the ZCTA was $50,673, and the median income for a family was $60,625. Males had a median income of $65,000 versus $24,148 for females. The per capita income for the ZCTA was $24,148. No families or individuals were below the poverty line.

== Geography ==
Verbank is located at 41°43′41″N 73°42′55″W, within the Dutchess County town of Union Vale, and is situated at about 591 ft (180 m) in elevation. Verbank Village, a related community, is located at 41°43′36″N 73°43′44″W, and sits at about 515 ft (157 m) above sea level. New York State Route 82 travels through the town; the road was first designated in 1930. Sprout Creek, a tributary of the Fishkill Creek, also crosses the town in a roughly north–south orientation. There are numerous smaller water bodies, including Willow Brook which feeds into Sprout Creek. Clove Mountain, at 1,398 ft (426 m) in elevation is located within the town.

The highest known temperate in Verbank was 99 °F, which occurred in 1948. The lowest temperature was –29 °F, recorded in 1994. Average monthly precipitation ranges from 2.62 in (67 mm) in February, to 4.37 in (0.111 m) in July. The coldest month is typically January, with an average high of 34 °F and a low of 12 °F. By contrast the warmest month on average is July, with high temperatures typically reaching 81 °F, and lows falling to around 56 °F.

== See also ==
- List of places in New York: V
