= Sprout Creek =

River in Dutchess County, New York, US

Coordinates: 41°33′1.34″N 73°50′34.48″W

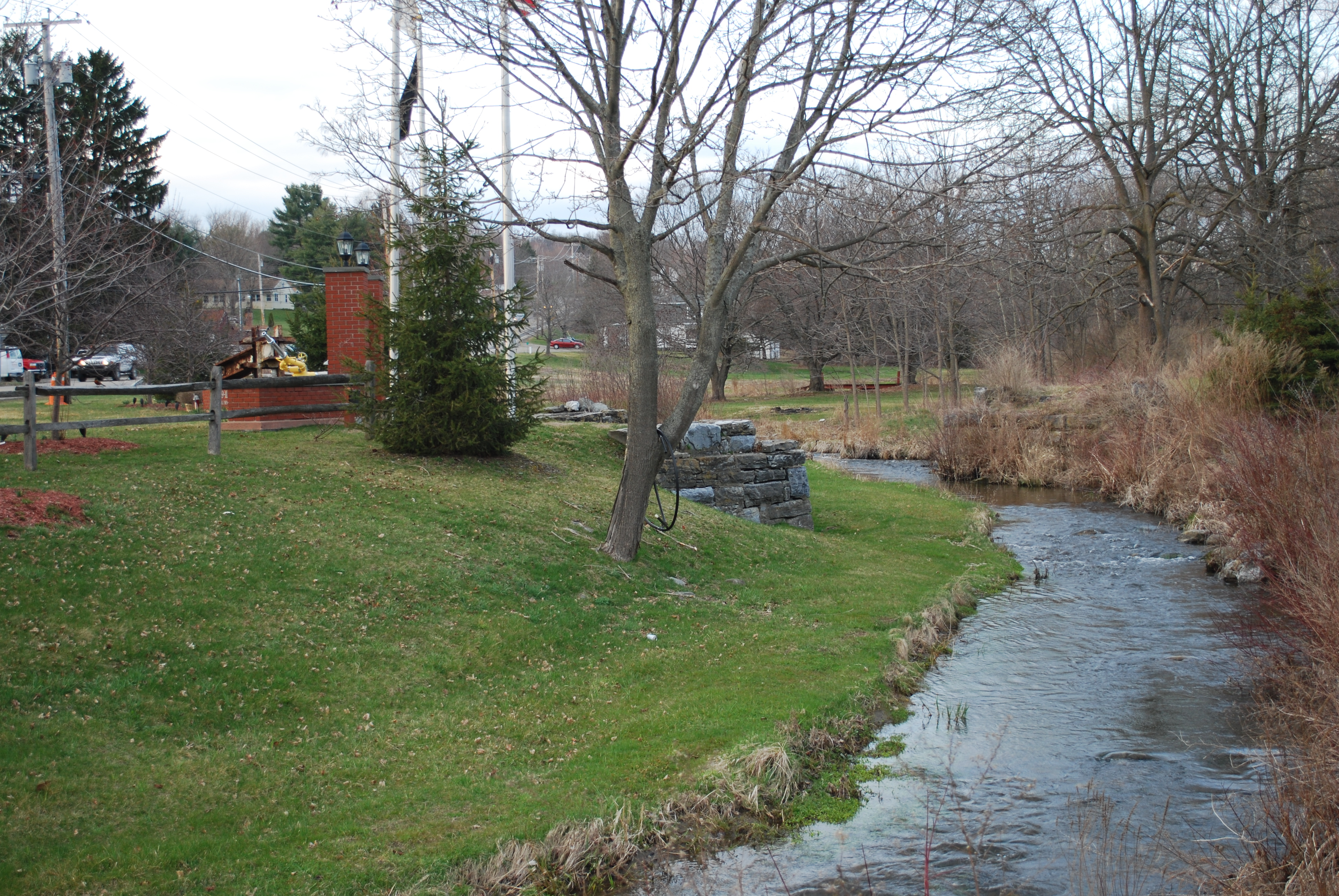
Sprout Creek in Verbank

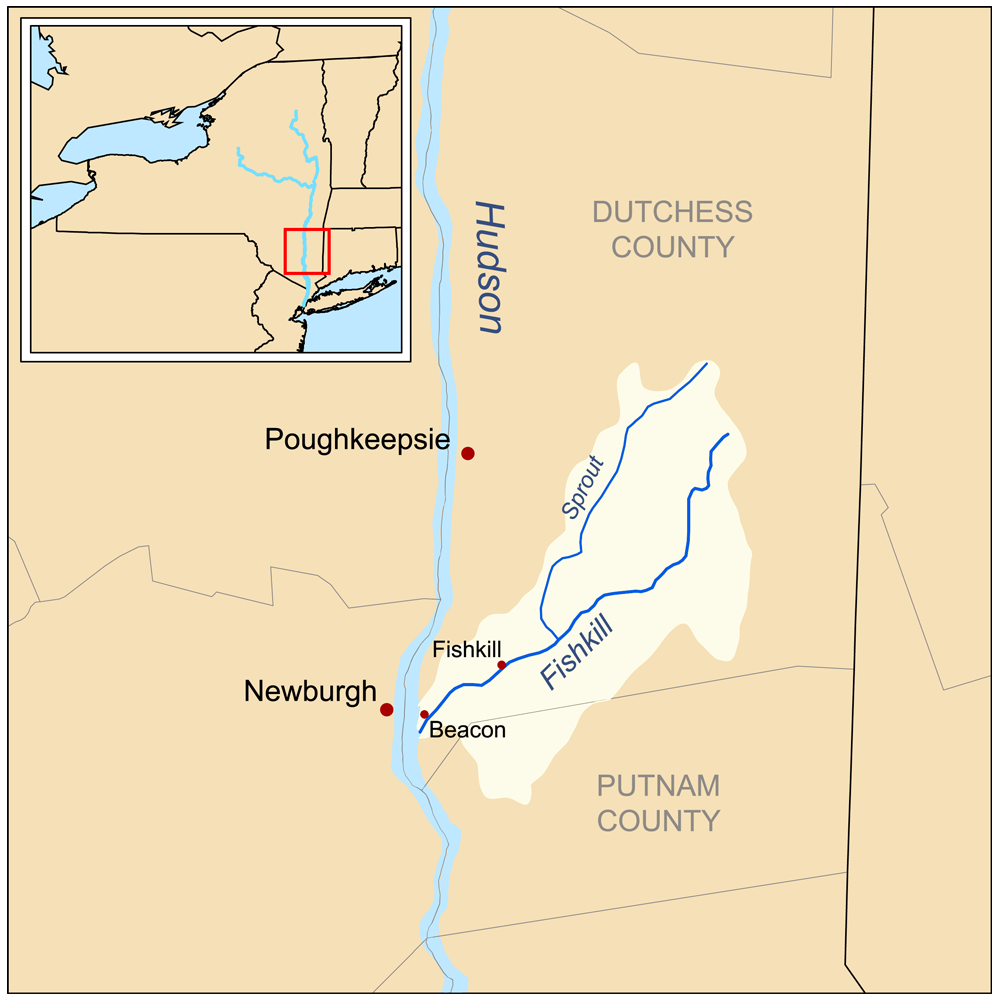
Map of the Fishkill Creek drainage basin showing Sprout Creek

Sprout Creek is a 24.8-mile-long (39.9 km) creek located entirely within Dutchess County, New York, United States. It is the largest tributary of Fishkill Creek, entering that creek some 11 miles (18 km) upstream from the Hudson River. The creek is annually stocked with 6,000 brown trout, and maintains its own natural population of trout.

== Course ==
Sprout Creek begins in Millbrook, at 755 feet (230 m) in elevation. Paralleling Oak Summit Road, the creek flows generally southward towards New York State Route 82, where it passes through Verbank. The creek turns towards the west, though after reaching Verbank Village, it resumes its southwestern course. It turns around several small hills and mountains, and later intersects New York State Route 55. Shortly thereafter, Sprout Creek crosses the Taconic State Parkway; it soon receives Jackson Creek. The Jackson Creek watershed covers 5,524 acres (2,235 ha) of land, draining a large portion of Union Vale into Sprout Creek, and has a small annual stocking of around 700 brown trout. Sprout Creek continues generally towards the southwest, and later towards the south, before once again passing under Route 82. The bridge over the creek, located in the town of Fishkill, was built in 1934. At 85 ft (26 m) long, the bridge carried an AADT of 19,400 vehicles as of February 2006. In 1722, William Verplanck constructed a dam across the creek. He also built a grinding mill on the creek's banks; during the American Revolution, this mill ground a large quantity of grain for the soldiers stationed at Fishkill. The creek ends at the Fishkill Creek, just north of New York State Route 52. Sprout Creek also passes through Sprout Creek Farm, an educational farm, in the town of LaGrange.

== Watershed ==
Comprising 24% of the overall Fishkill Creek watershed, the Sprout Creek subwatershed encompasses about 46 square miles (120 km^{2}) of land—of which 17% was being used for agricultural purposes in 2000. The creek's quality is described as "good" by the Fishkill Creek Watershed Committee, though agricultural operations, sewer treatment plants, and septic systems led to pollution at certain times during a study from 1973 to 2002. It drains portions of La Grange, Union Vale, Wappinger, and East Fishkill.

One of only three trout creeks in Dutchess County, the creek is annually stocked with 6,000 brown trout; wild trout are also present. A group of local residents formed the Sprout Creek Association, after the operation of a nearby rock mine prompted concerns about the creek's environmental health.
