= Mabbettsville, New York =

- Hamlet
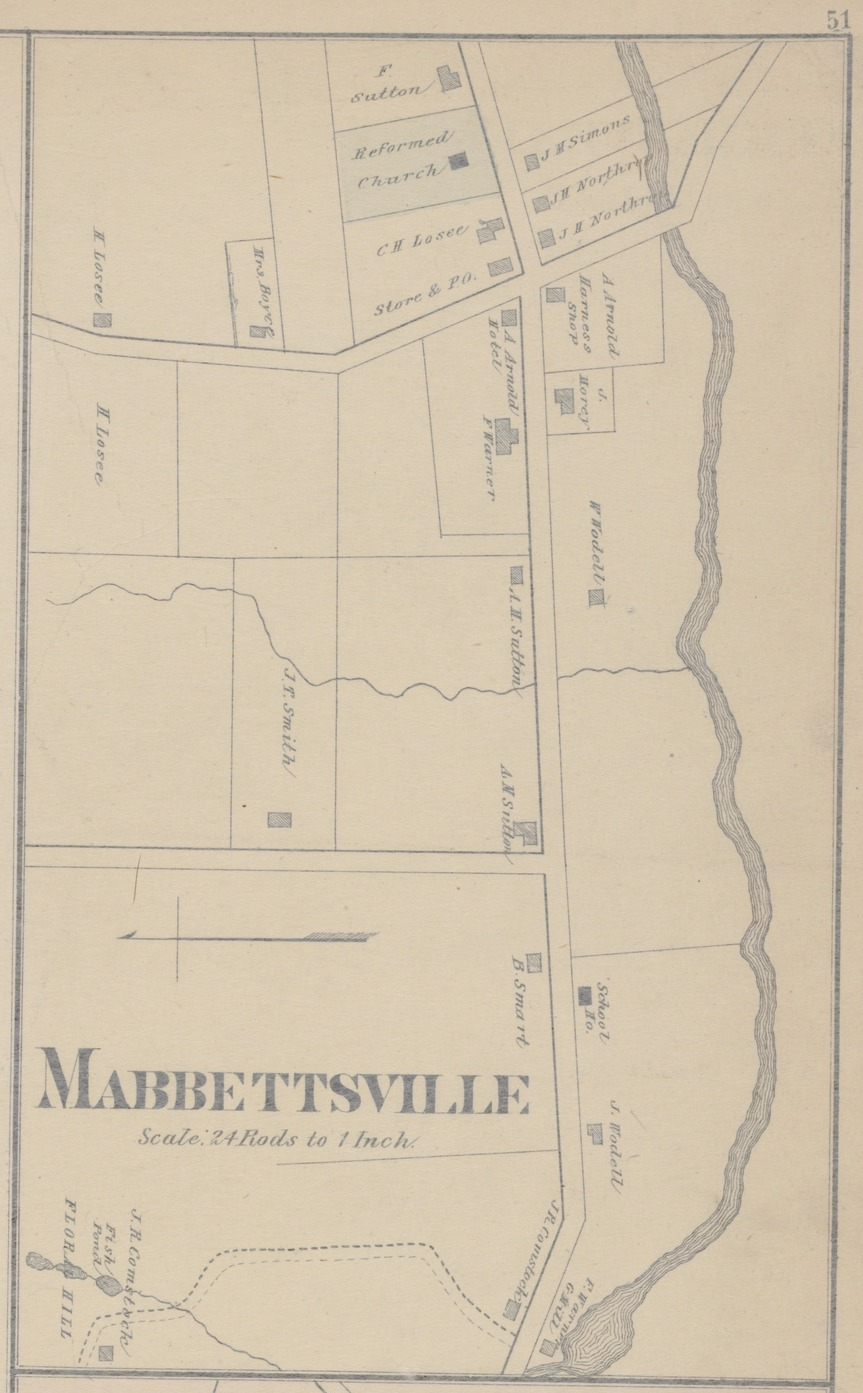
- map from the New illustrated atlas of Dutchess County, New York, published by H.L. Kochersperger in 1876

- Location within the state of New York
- Coordinates: 41°47′33″N 73°39′34″W
- Country: United States
- State: New York
- County: Dutchess
- Town: Washington
- Named for: James Mabbett
- Elevation: 696 ft (212 m)
- Time zone: UTC-5 (Eastern (EST))
  - Summer (DST): UTC-5 (EST)
- Former name: Flikentown

Mabbettsville is a settlement in Dutchess County, New York, United States. Located 2 miles (3 km) east of Millbrook in the town of Washington on U.S. Route 44, it is approximately 85 miles (137 km) north of New York City.

The settlement forms one of the most concentrated residential areas of the town, and is the location of Town Park, a baseball field – one of the few recreational areas to the east of Washington. The settlement's main commerce is related to recreation, including dog kennels, antique shops, and a range of home and landscape occupations.

== History ==
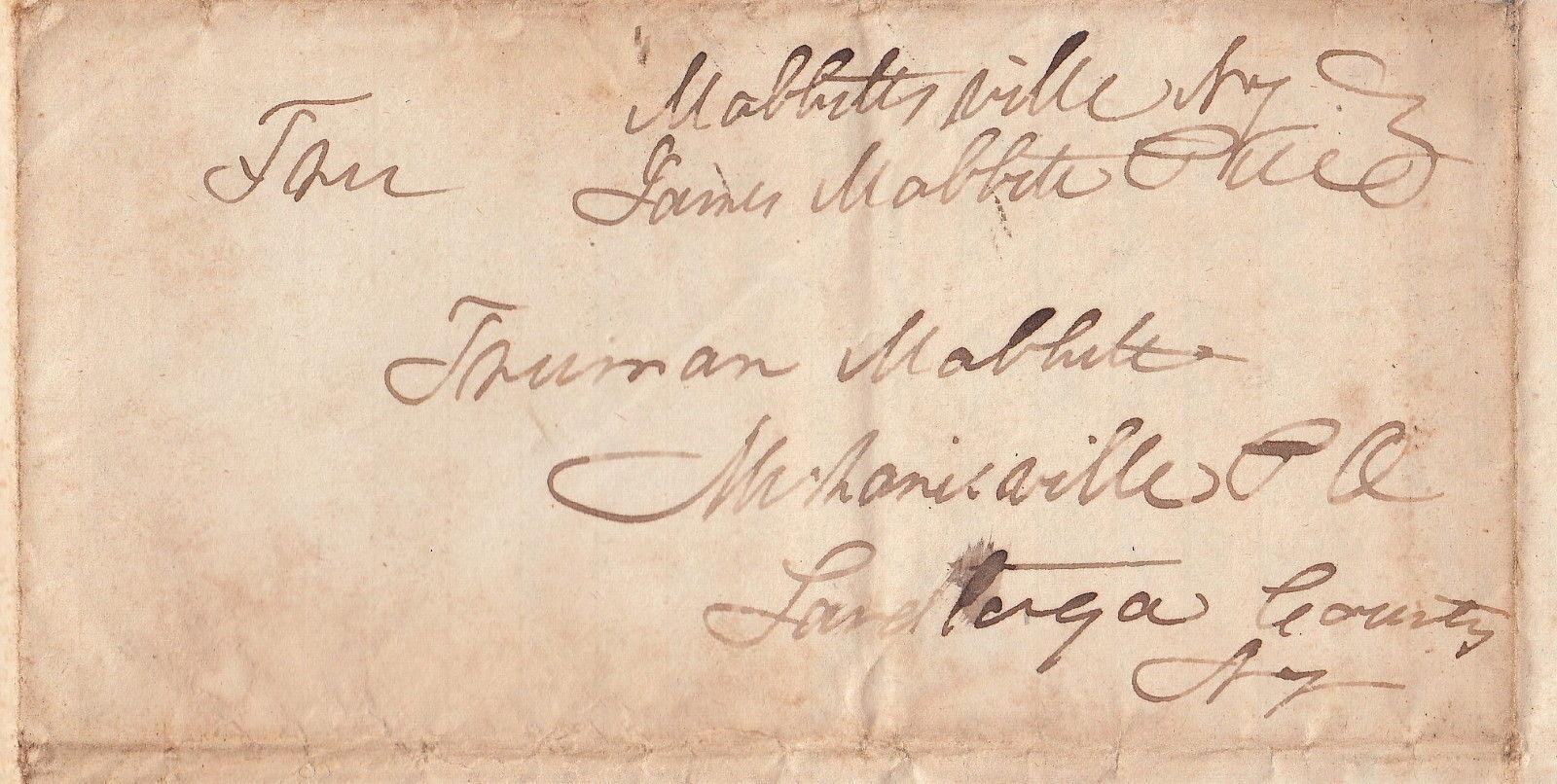
Cover of a letter from James Mabbett of Mabbettsville to his brother Trueman, giving the sender's address as Mabbettsville (1846)

The hamlet was previously named "Flikentown" after one of the Great Nine Partners. The new name honours James Mabbett, a commission auctioneer who settled in the hamlet early in the 19th century. In 1937 it consisted of a store, a garage, and a few houses.
