= Fishkill Creek =

Tributary of the Hudson River in southern Dutchess County, New York

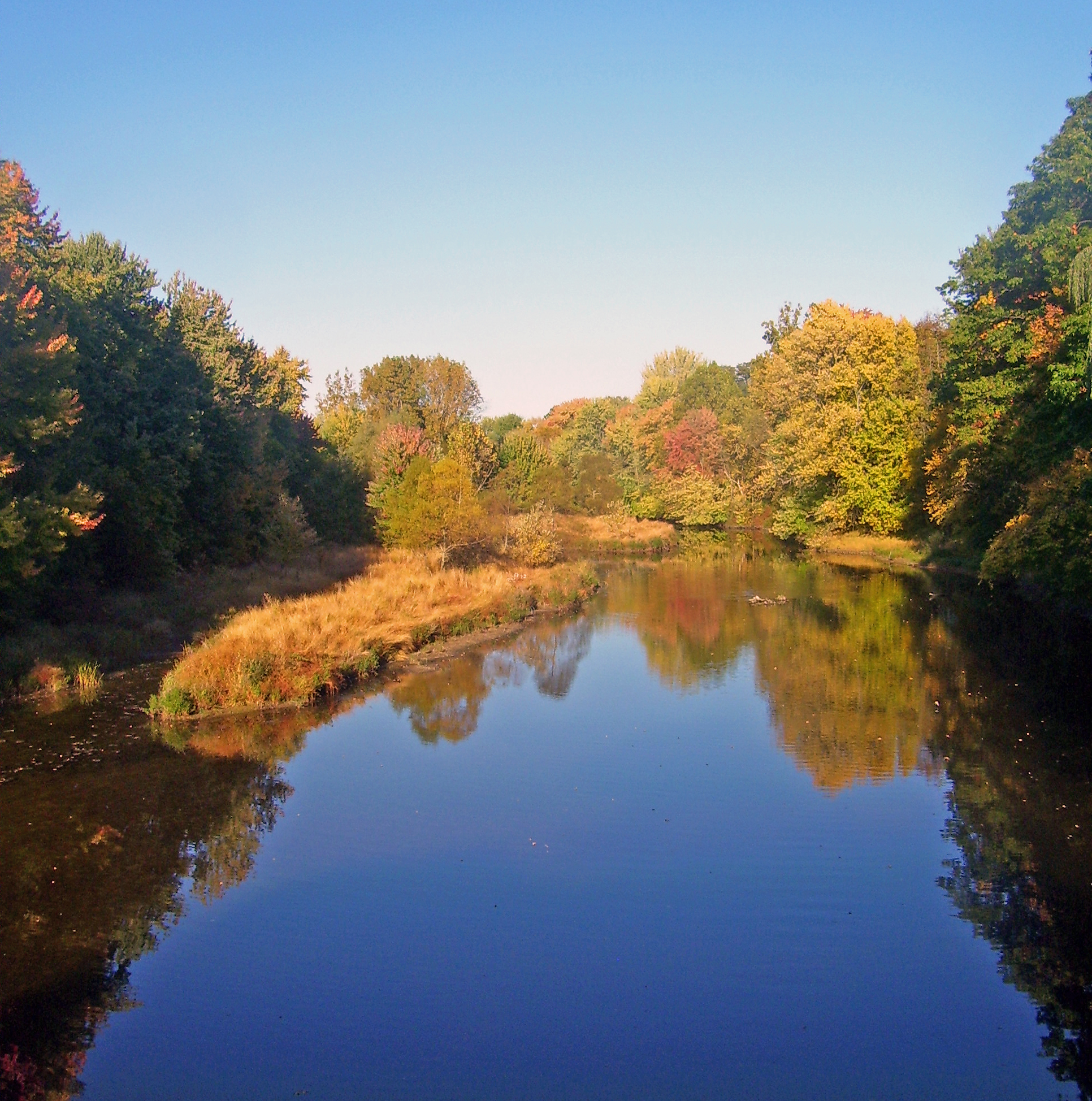
- Fishkill Creek from NY 52 near Brinckerhoff

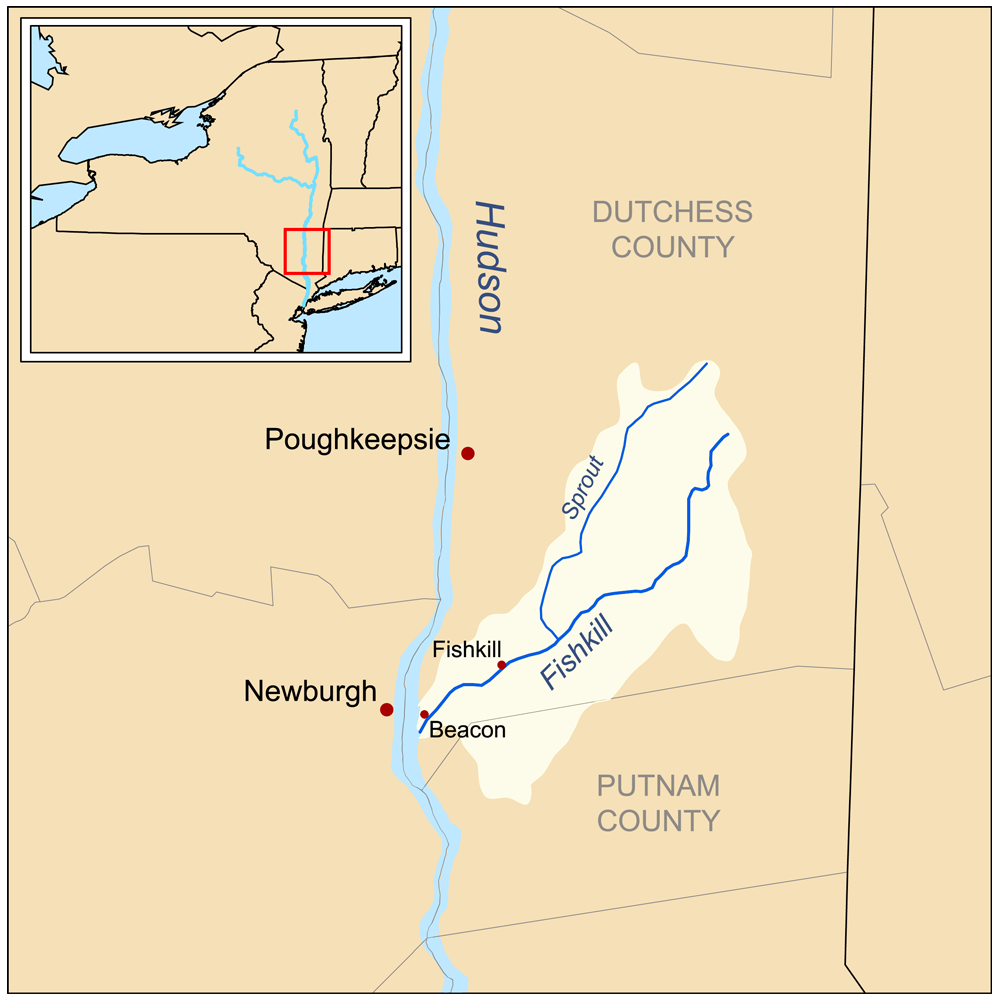
- Fishkill Creek watershed
- Etymology: Dutch for "fish stream"
- Native name: Matteawan (Munsee)

Location
- Country: United States
- State: New York
- Region: Hudson Valley
- County: Dutchess
- Towns: Union Vale, Beekman, East Fishkill, Fishkill

Physical characteristics
- Source: Pray Pond
  - coordinates: 41°40′38″N 73°40′38″W
  - elevation: 480 ft (150 m)
- Mouth: Hudson River S of Denning Point
  - coordinates: 41°28′55″N 73°59′8″W
  - elevation: 0 ft (0 m)
- Length: 33.5 mi (53.9 km), SW
- Basin size: 193 sq mi (500 km^{2})
- Discharge
  - location: Beacon
  - average: 205 cu ft/s (5.8 m^{3}/s)
  - minimum: 1.1 cu ft/s (0.031 m^{3}/s)September 12, 1964
  - maximum: 6,970 cu ft/s (197 m^{3}/s)August 20, 1955
- Discharge
  - location: Hopewell Junction
  - average: 130 cu ft/s (3.7 m^{3}/s)
  - minimum: 25 cu ft/s (0.71 m^{3}/s)1965
  - maximum: 140 cu ft/s (4.0 m^{3}/s)1972

Basin features
- Tributaries
  - left: Whaley Lake Brook, Clove Creek
  - right: Whortlekill Creek, Sprout Creek

Fishkill Creek (also Fish Kill, from the Dutch vis kille, for "fish creek") is a tributary of the Hudson River in Dutchess County, New York, United States. At 33.5 miles (53.9 km) it is the second-longest stream in the county, after Wappinger Creek. It rises in the town of Union Vale and flows generally southwest to a small estuary on the Hudson just south of Beacon. Part of its 193-square-mile (500 km^{2}) watershed is in Putnam County to the south. Sprout Creek, the county's third-longest creek, is its most significant tributary. Whaley and Sylvan lakes and Beacon Reservoir, its largest, deepest and highest lakes, are among the bodies of water within the watershed.

While the creek is not impounded for use in any local water supply, it remains a focus of regional conservation efforts as a recreational and aesthetic resource, especially since the lower Fishkill watershed has been extensively developed in the last two decades. It flows through several local parks and is a popular trout stream. Industries and mills along it helped spur the settlement of the region.

== Course ==
Clove and Sweezy brooks, themselves fed by tributaries named and unnamed draining the steep slopes on either side of the narrow upper Clove Valley in the town of Union Vale, drain the swamps of the valley into Pray Pond just north of the hamlet of Clove. Fishkill Creek is the pond's outflow.

It follows Clove Valley Road (County Route 9) closely at first, flowing almost due south alongside it, then swings westward into woods after receiving Christie Pond's outlet brook opposite Clove Cemetery. At a short loop in a swampy area where Bruzgul Road (County Route 21) crosses twice, it receives another tributary, doubles back to the north around a hill to receive another one and then returns to its southward course to widen into McKinney Pond. Once it crosses Bruzgul Road again, it is in Tymor Park, Union Vale's major community center.

At the park's south end it flows into Furnace Pond, named for an iron mine that was once nearby, and then into the town of Beekman. It returns to the side of County Route 9, now Clove Valley Road, and crosses under the NY 55 state highway just west of its intersection with Route 9. As that road climbs the side of a hill, Fishkill Creek crosses to its east side.

It continues past Beekman's main park to the hamlet of Beekman, then is impounded into a new, unnamed lake near Green Haven Correctional Facility. Shortly afterwards it crosses into the town of East Fishkill. At the town line, south of the hamlet of Stormville, it receives the Whaley Lake outlet brook. It flows westerly through more woods and swamps to where it receives the Sylvan Lake outlet brook just east of the Taconic State Parkway. After crossing underneath, it parallels the parkway south on its west side, then turns west again and makes a northward bend around another hill to once again parallel County Route 9, now Beekman Road, for a short distance, then follows the hill's base to the south. From here it meanders under the Metro-North Beacon Line south of Hopewell Junction where it receives Whortlekill Creek. It passes the Hopewell Recreation Center and then flows under NY 376.

It parallels another state road, NY 82, through a wooded, undeveloped area for several miles to where it receives its longest tributary, Sprout Creek, at the Fishkill town line. It widens into a series of large pools south of Brinckerhoff, at the foot of Honness Mountain where NY 52 crosses.

From here it flows more to the west-southwest, a wide stream paralleling Route 52 and the Beacon Line. It crosses under US 9 in a developed area just south of the village of Fishkill. It then turns to the southwest again and receives Clove Creek, a tributary that rises in Fahnestock State Park to the south and drains the Putnam County portion of the Fishkill watershed, just before it flows under Interstate 84.

Beyond the interstate it continues southwest alongside the base of the northern slopes of Fishkill Ridge, the northernmost end of the Hudson Highlands. It detours slightly to the north near Glenham and then resumes its southwesterly course as it flows into the city of Beacon, where it passes through the eastern section of the city in a narrow valley with the Beacon Line running along its shore. There are many rapids and waterfalls as it descends more sharply to the Hudson. Here it receives its last tributary, Dry Brook, which drains Beacon Reservoir on the ridgetop.

South of the Wolcott Avenue (NY 9D) bridge, the shores become wooded again as it flows over Tioronda Dam and under the remains of Tioronda Bridge. Below here the creek's estuary opens up, and after being split by a small island it flows under a causeway carrying Metro-North's Hudson Line and empties into the Hudson south of Denning Point.

== Watershed ==
Fishkill Creek's 193-square-mile (500 km^{2}) watershed is the second largest in Dutchess County after Wappinger Creek to the north. It includes almost the entire towns of Beekman and Union Vale, large portions of East Fishkill and Fishkill, sections of LaGrange and Wappinger and small areas in Pleasant Valley and Washington. The Whaley Lake basin, which also includes Little Whaley and Nuclear lakes, is in Pawling. In Putnam County the largest town represented is Philipstown, whose northwestern section (the Clove Creek watershed) drains into the Fishkill. A small portion is in Kent, with an even smaller portion in Putnam Valley marking the watershed's southernmost point.

To the north is the Wappinger Creek watershed. The Ten Mile River basin, the only portion of New York that drains into the Housatonic River, is to the east. On the southeast are the headwaters of the Croton River, an important part of New York City's water supply, with smaller tributaries of the Hudson like Melzingah Brook and Surprise Brook rising on the southeast.

The creek's valley is mostly low-lying level land, with the exception of the area above its headwaters in Union Vale. Most of its descent takes place either in its uppermost 10 miles (16 km), above Poughquag, or its lowermost 5 miles (8 km), below the village of Fishkill, both stretches of which account for 200 feet (61 m) each of its total drop. The average elevation within the watershed is 635 feet (194 m) above sea level. To the south and east are hiller regions of the Taconic Mountains, part of the Highlands Province physiographic region of the Appalachian Mountains. The highest point in the Fishkill's watershed is 1,610-foot (490 m) South Beacon Mountain, also the highest peak of the Hudson Highlands, a few miles from the creek's estuary, which is almost at sea level. In Union Vale, near the creek's source, Clove Mountain rises to 1,400 feet (430 m).

There are 338 miles (544 km) of tributaries within the watershed. The longest is Sprout Creek, which flows south 18.5 miles (29.8 km) from Millbrook to Hopewell Junction. Within the watershed, there are also around 1,575 acres (637 ha) of ponds or lakes. The largest of these is Whaley Lake, at 252 acres (102 ha) also the largest lake in the county. The next-largest lake in the watershed, Sylvan Lake, is the county's deepest.

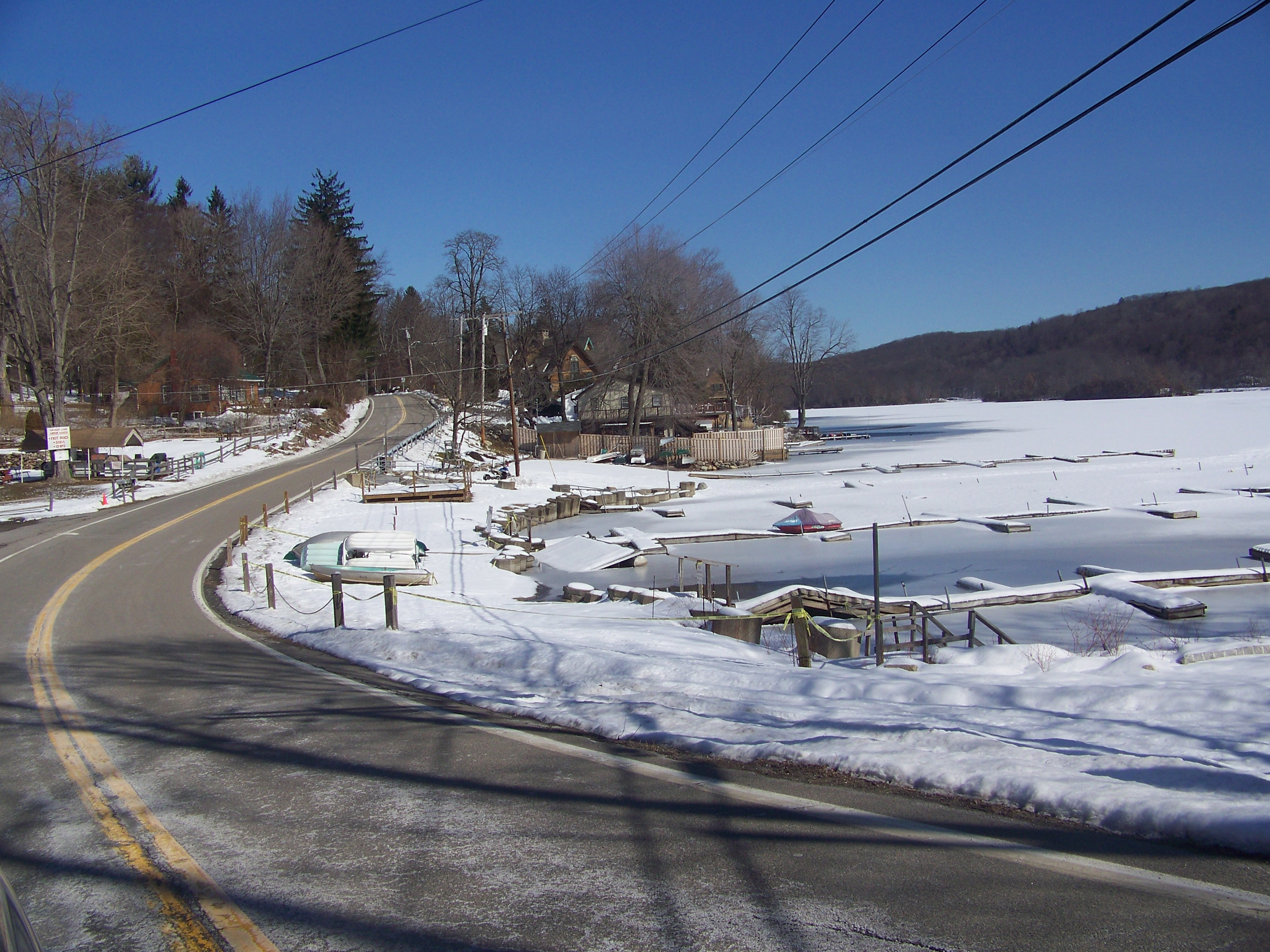
Whaley Lake in winter

Water bodies and wetlands cover about 9.8% of the total watershed area. Forests cover 50%, the largest land use category in it. Most are concentrated in the northern, eastern and southern extremes. Residential and agricultural uses account for 21% and 10% respectively. Residential use is heaviest along the lower Sprout Creek and the lower section of Fishkill Creek from Fishkill to Beacon. Agricultural use is most common on the fringes of the more developed areas near the streams.

There are many parks and protected areas within the watershed. The largest is 14,086-acre (5,700 ha) Clarence Fahnestock State Park in Putnam County; however only a portion of that park is within the Fishkill Creek basin. The largest protected area entirely within the watershed is the 3,000-acre (1,200 ha) Sharpe Reservation straddling the county line. The Fishkill Ridge Conservation Area, 1,030 acres (420 ha) on that mountain, is the largest within the area open to the public. Publicly protected areas in the watershed include 50 acres (20 ha) James Baird State Park off the Taconic Parkway and the 909 acres (368 ha) Taconic-Hereford Multiple Use Area nearby. Union Vale's 500-acre (200 ha) Tymor Park near the creek's source is the largest local park. The Innisfree Garden landscape in Pleasant Valley, near the north end of the watershed, is irrigated with water pumped from Tyrrell Lake. In addition, 20 miles (32 km) of the Appalachian Trail runs along the southern fringe of the watershed, much of it on other protected lands or corridor owned by the National Park Service.

Of the municipalities predominantly within the watershed, East Fishkill is the most populous, with more than 25,000 residents as of the 2000 census. The town and village of Fishkill are the next largest with almost 22,000. Beacon, the third-most populous community in the watershed at almost 14,000, has the highest population density in the watershed with 2,892 people per square mile.

=== Climate ===
Based on weather reports from the Institute of Ecosystem Studies (IES) near Millbrook and Dutchess County Airport in Wappinger, both just outside it to the north and west respectively, the watershed has the humid continental climate typical of much of the Northeast. Temperatures tend to vary considerably over the year, with periods of unusual extremes of heat or cold possible.

The average annual temperature recorded over a 30-year period at the airport is 49.3 °F (9.6 °C). Monthly means range from 24.7 °F (−4.1 °C) in January to 72.4 °F (22.4 °C) in July. Average annual precipitation is 43.8 inches (1,110 mm), with minimum monthly means varying from 2.6 inches (66 mm) in February to 4.8 inches (120 mm) in May. An average of 34.5 inches (880 mm) of snow falls in the watershed each year, with January's 10.6-inch (270 mm) snowfall being the highest monthly mean. There are 6,267 annual heating degree days and 645 cooling degree days.

IES has measured precipitation acidity in the area since 1984. Rainfall in the area has an average pH of 4.27, with averages falling to 4.00 in July but rising to 4.54 in November. This means the rain in Dutchess County and the watershed is ten times more acidic than the natural 5.2 reading for precipitation.

== River modifications ==
There are 13 dams along the creek. Five are located in Beacon, most built to serve past industry there (one is still used for hydroelectric power generation. The highest, near the city's downtown section, is 40 feet (12 m) tall.

Three are in Beekman and two are in Fishkill, the latter built by Texaco for a research facility it ran in the area from 1931 to 2003. The dams along the upper Fishkill impound the stream into old mill ponds, such as Furnace Pond in Tymor Park, just above the site of an old iron smelter, giving the pond its name. The dams prevent the upstream movement of fish at all stages of the creek.

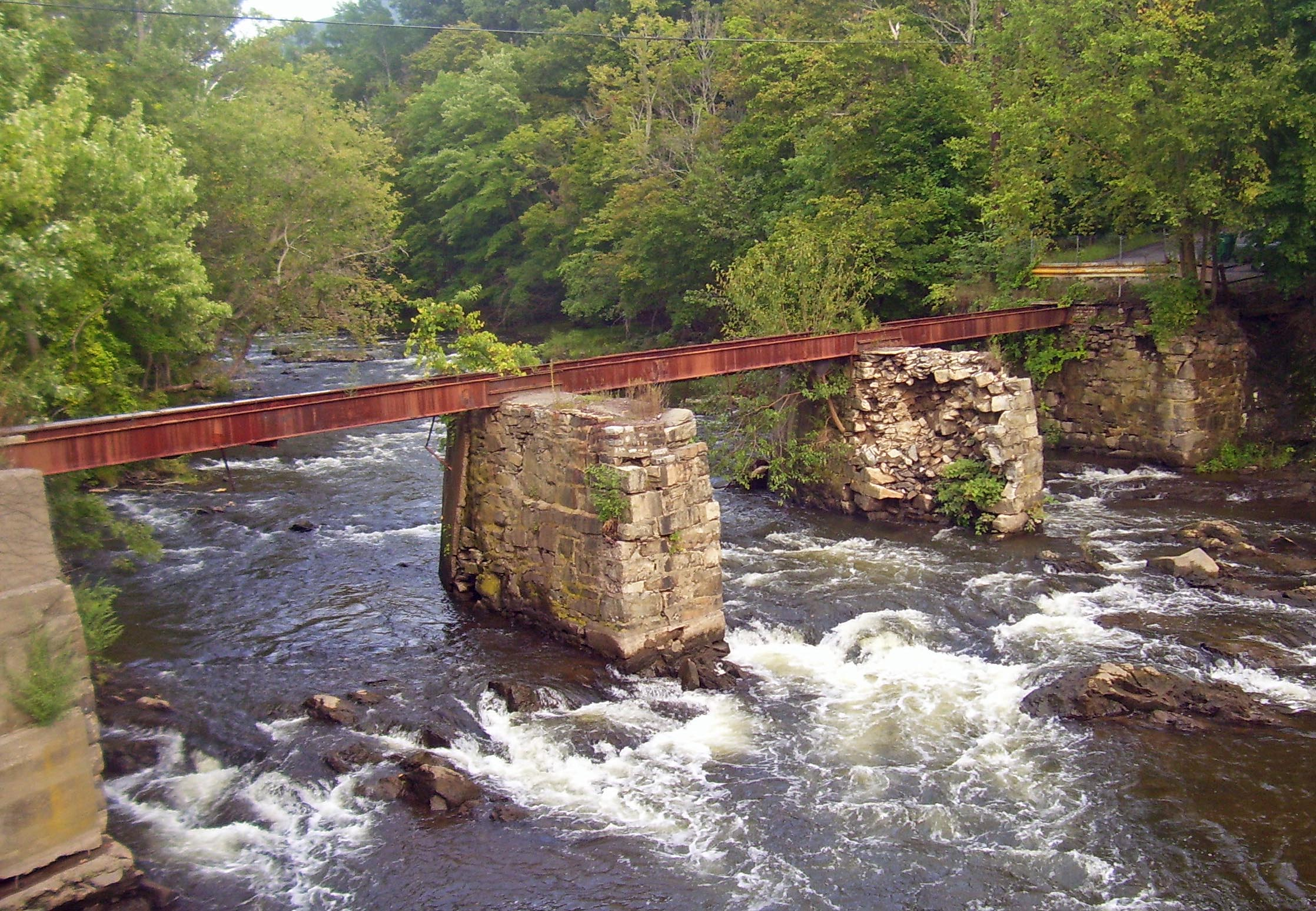
Tioronda Bridge

The oldest extant bridge over the creek is Tioronda Bridge, just above its estuary in Beacon. It was an iron bowstring truss bridge built shortly after the Civil War that carried South Avenue across the Fishkill. It was listed on the National Register of Historic Places in 1976, but it had deteriorated so much that by the end of the 20th century it had been closed even to pedestrians. In 2006 the city dismantled it, preserving the bowstring trusses for possible reuse on a rebuilt bridge. The abutments remain in the stream, carrying some utility pipes only.

== Wildlife ==
The creek and its watershed support a great diversity of species. As a fishery, it is stocked with brown trout, and has a significant brook trout population as well. The estuary supports a largemouth and smallmouth bass population.

Some plant and animal species found near the creek and in its watershed are on the state list of endangered or threatened species. The former include the bog turtle, wild hydrangea and live-forever. Threatened species in the creek and watershed include the bald eagle, Blanding's turtle, least bittern, pied-billed grebe, stiff-leaf goldenrod, swamp cottonwood and blazing star. Several salamander and turtle species are also species of concern. Eurasian watermilfoil, an invasive species, has been seen in some areas.

== Geology ==
The creek flows through two distinct geological regions within the Highlands: the Mid-Hudson Valley and the Hudson Highlands. Both have different types of bedrock, impacting the nature of the stream and allowing for differences in aquifer development.

The Mid-Hudson Valley region underlying most of Fishkill Creek consists of sedimentary rocks such as shales, sandstones, siltstones and dolomitic limestones that formed during the Cambrian and Ordovician periods of the Paleozoic Era, roughly 450–540 million years ago. These rocks become modified into metamorphic equivalents as a result of the formation of the Appalachian Mountains, which left large thrust faults in the area, the further east one gets from the Hudson. Shales become schists, limestones become marbles, and sandstone become quartzites in the eastern regions of Dutchess County. These rocks create better aquifers than their sedimentary counterparts.

In the Hudson Highlands, the stream's bedrock is primarily metamorphic gneiss, with some granite and amphibolite. These are older rocks, formed in high temperatures and pressures more than a billion years ago in the Pre-Cambrian. These generally make poor aquifers, although individual houses can use one if they overlie a fault where groundwater collects.

== History ==
The Iroquois tribes of the area called the stream Tioronda: "Little stream that flows into big water". Dutch settlers called it Vis Kill (Dutch for "fish creek") for the abundant fish in the stream. When control of the area passed to the English, it was Anglicized to Fishkill Creek (the addition of "Creek" creates a bilingual tautology, as kill is the Dutch word for creek, though this is not common knowledge to English speakers).

In the late 17th century, two New York City merchants, Francis Rombout and Gulian Verplanck, bought 85,000 acres (34,000 ha), most of it in the creek's watershed, from the local Indians. Verplanck died before the transaction could be finished, and with his share divided among his heirs the land became known as the Rombout Patent. In 1709 his daughter Catheryna and her husband Roger Brett became the first European settlers in the Fishkill valley. She administered the subdivision and sale of the patent lands from her house, which still stands near downtown Beacon, the oldest continuously occupied house in Dutchess County. They also built the first mill on the creek in 1717.

The upper Fishkill was settled around the same time. Henry Beekman, after boundary disputes with the Rombout patentees were resolved in their favor, obtained a crown grant of his own in 1703 for the lands now in the towns of Beekman and Union Vale. In 1710 the first settlers put down roots. One of them, six years later, was Zacharias Flagler, ancestor of Henry Morrison Flagler.

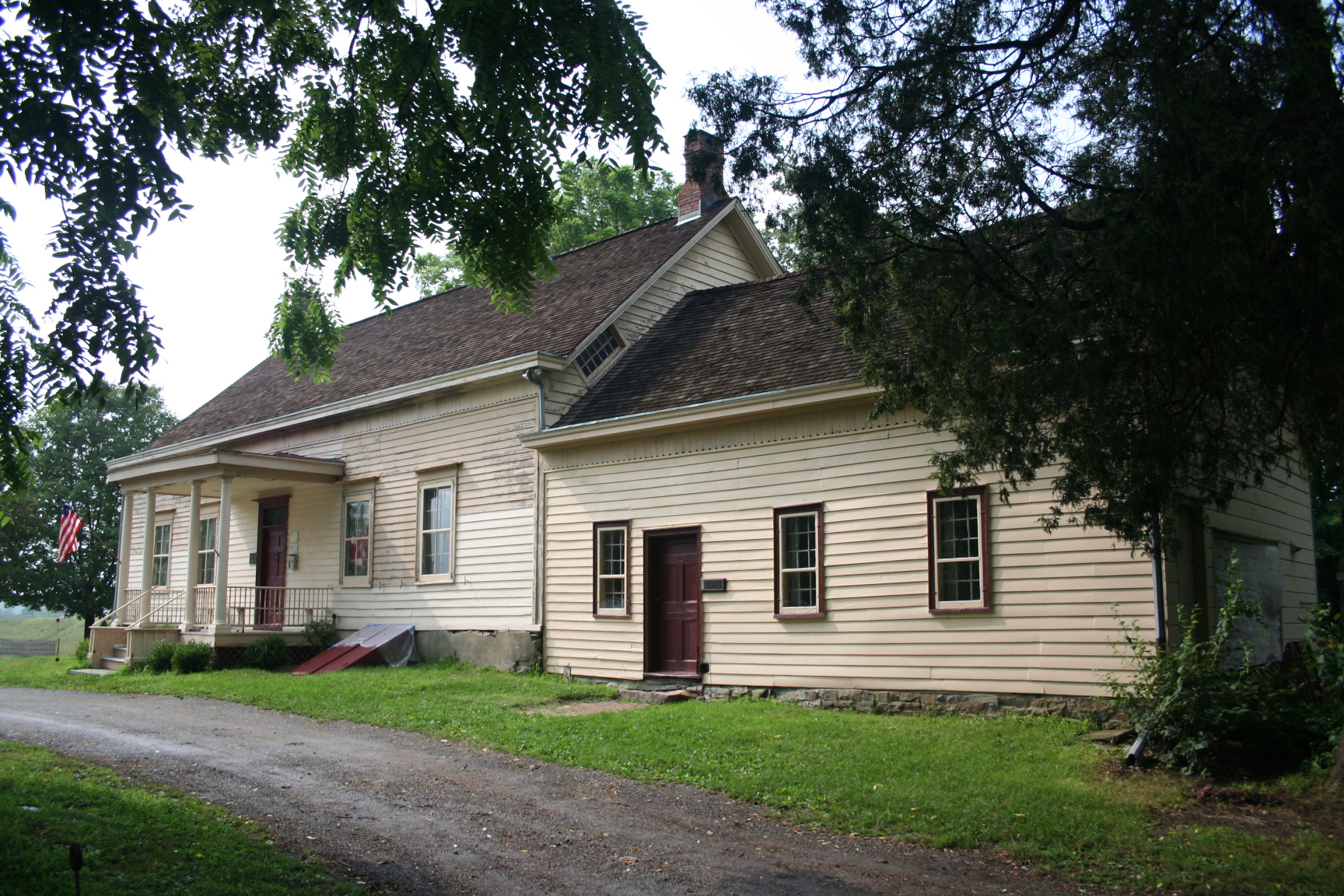
Van Wyck Homestead, headquarters of the Fishkill Supply Depot

During the Revolutionary War, the Fishkill south of the village of Fishkill was a key location for the Continental Army. Troops were on continuous alert should the British Army try to push up through the Highlands to the south and retake the Hudson Valley, a move that could have cut the colonies in half. At the junction of two major overland routes, it was also the site of a key supply depot, and a large encampment of soldiers was located on 70 acres (28 ha) on the south of the creek, about where the interchange of Interstate 84 and US 9 is located now. George Washington passed through the area frequently. In 2009 the graves of as many as 700 soldiers were discovered at the site.

As industrialization began in the 19th century, factories joined the mills in tapping the Fishkill for waterpower. They also discharged their wastes into the stream. In 1853 businessmen in Matteawan, now part of Beacon, dammed Whaley Lake to control water levels downstream, expanding the lake to its present size.

In the early 20th century the watershed was among the many considered by a state commission for an expansion of the New York City water supply system, which was being strained by the city's rapid growth. The commission postulated that a reservoir near Stormville could be built for a cost of $17.4 million ($624 million in contemporary dollars) and provide storage capacity of 52.7 billion US gallons (199,000,000 m^{3}). The Fishkill had the advantage of being immediately to the north of the Croton River watershed in Putnam and Westchester counties already tapped by the city, so it would not be necessary to build a long aqueduct to bring water to the city from the new reservoir.

"[I]ts waters can be secured more quickly than those of any other supply of equal amount" in the state, the commission wrote in its 1904 report. The city ultimately decided not to use the Fishkill and instead acquired the land to build Ashokan Reservoir on Esopus Creek in Ulster County, across the Hudson.

In the later 20th century, after the industrial use of the lower watershed had declined somewhat, the area saw explosive population growth. Former farmlands were redeveloped as residential subdivisions, and southeastern Dutchess County became an exurban area of New York City. This increased runoff and other discharges into the stream.

== Conservation ==
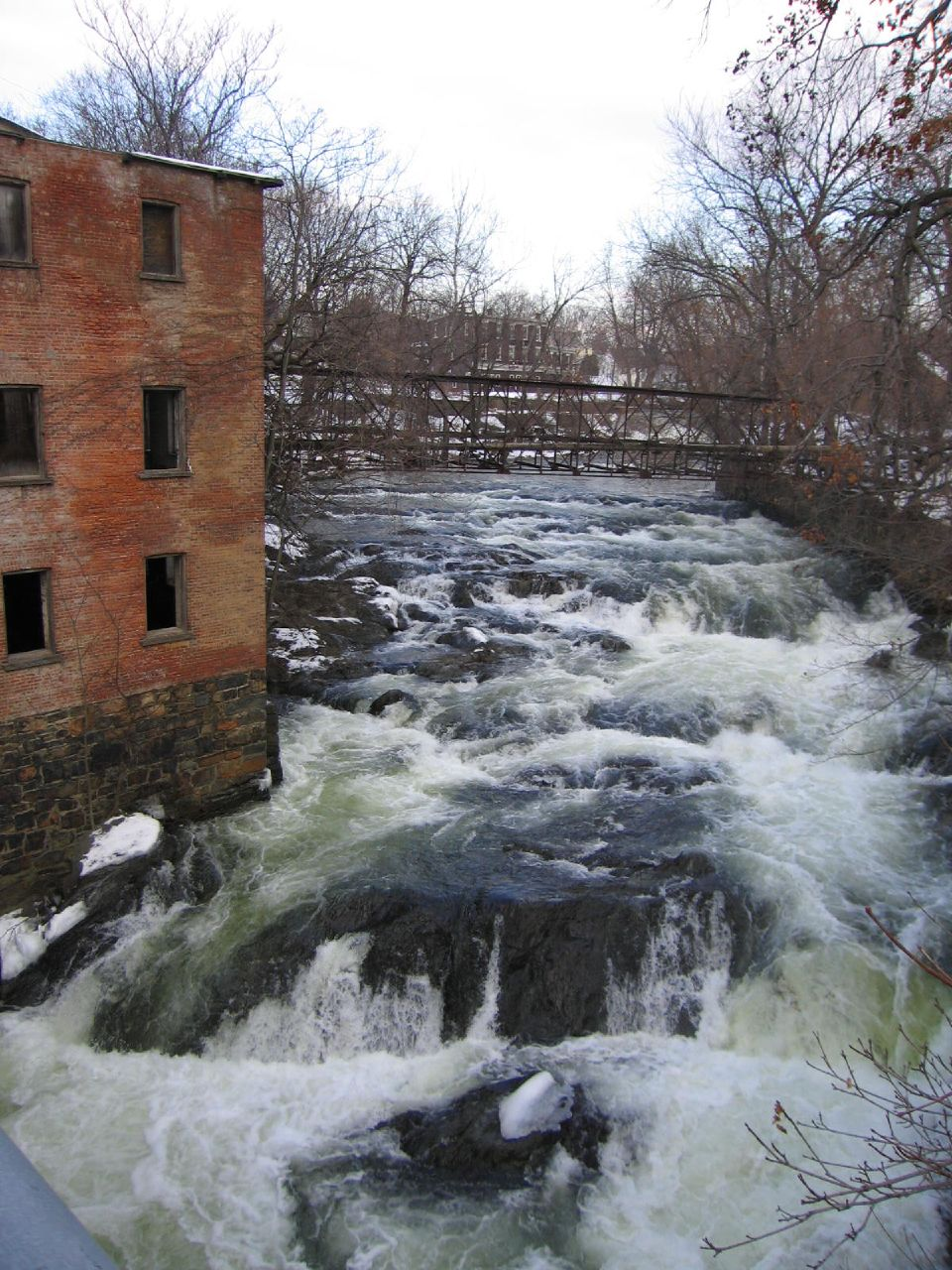
Fishkill Creek in Beacon

The main stem of the Fishkill is not used as a water supply, although some of its tributaries are, such as Beacon's Dry Brook, impounded by the city for Beacon Reservoir. Nor is it navigable due to its many dams. It has nevertheless been a focus of local conservation efforts both as a local scenic and recreational resource and as an indicator of the health of the aquifers around it.

In 1975, just as development of the lower watershed was beginning to accelerate, the United States Geological Survey closed the Hopewell Junction stream gauge. The Beacon stream gauge had already been shut down in 1967. There has thus been no consistent data on streamflow, a frequent measure of development's impact on a stream, since then. At the time of their respective closures, the Beacon station showed a slow decline in discharge, while the Hopewell Junction station showed an increase. A 1992 study predicted that if current demographic and hydrologic trends continue both the Fishkill and Sprout could expect to have an annual weeklong dry period by 2035.

Recent biological and chemical testing indicates water quality has been improving in the upper watershed (above the village of Fishkill) but remains low below it, particularly in the creek within the city of Beacon, with an improvement just above the estuary. There are 25 State Pollution Discharge Elimination System (SPDES) permits issued by the state Department of Environmental Conservation (DEC) within the watershed, four of which are on the Fishkill itself. A further 64 permits have been issued for groundwater discharge.

The largest facilities to have SPDES permits on the Fishkill itself are the former Texaco facility at Glenham, between Beacon and the village of Fishkill, and Green Haven. Chevron, which took over the former from Texaco, closed it in 2003. The Environmental Protection Agency has been monitoring cleanup efforts of the volatile organic compounds at the site and considers them to be progressing according to schedule.

An ongoing concern is the IBM facility in East Fishkill, which dumps its wastewater into Gildersleeves Brook, a tributary of Wiccopee Creek. In 2002, the company introduced a new method of chip manufacture on 300 mm silicon wafers. Within four years the plant had become the state's top water polluter by pounds of pollutants in the 3.2 million US gallons (12,000 m^{3}) the plant releases into the creek every day, as production expanded due to demand for the chips, which power the PlayStation 3 video game console, primarily copper, lead and nitrates. In 2004 the company settled a suit brought by local residents who argued that a contractor's dumping of perchloroethylene had led to an increase in cancer and other diseases. Researchers have so far been unable to determine if some phenomena reported downstream, such as increased lead levels in crustaceans, are the result of the IBM discharges.

In 2005 the Fishkill Creek Watershed Committee, in partnership with the Dutchess County Environmental Management Council, inventoried the natural resources of the stream and watershed to produce a management plan. It focused on protecting groundwater, which many residents surveyed had expressed the greatest level of concern about. Recommendations made were to expand and maintain riparian buffer along the stream while protecting it against encroaching land use, and to find a way to balance groundwater withdrawals and discharges. It also called for research into alternatives to the use of impervious surfaces, such as asphalt, which increased runoff at the expense of groundwater.

== Lists ==
=== Communities ===
- City of Beacon
- Town of Fishkill
  - Glenham
  - Village of Fishkill
  - Brinckerhoff
- Town of East Fishkill
  - Hopewell Junction
  - Stormville
- Town of Beekman
  - Poughquag
- Town of Union Vale

=== Dams ===
- Tioronda Dam
- Wolcott Avenue Dam
- New York Rubber Company Dam
- Braendly Fishkill Dam
- Glenham Dam
- Texaco Dam
- Sydeman Dam
- Greenburg Henderson Dam
- McKinney Dam
- Furnace Pond Dam
- Pray Pond Dam

There are also two unnamed dams in the town of Beekman.

=== Tributaries ===
==== Left ====
- Dry Brook
- Clove Creek
- Wiccopee Creek
- Whaley Stream

==== Right ====
- Sprout Creek
- Whortlekill Creek

== See also ==
- List of rivers of New York
