= Beacon Reservoir (Dutchess County, New York) =

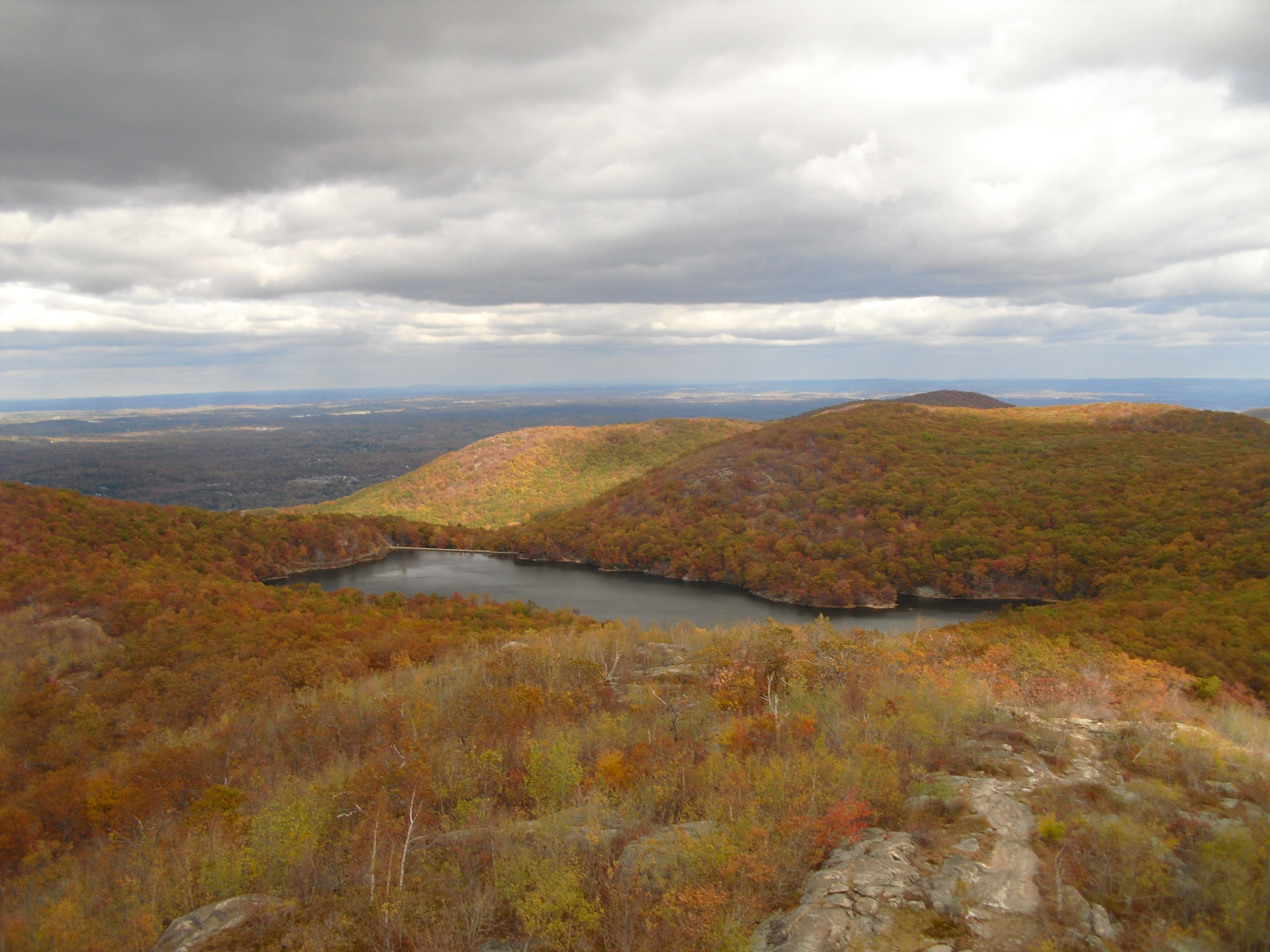
- Beacon Reservoir from the fire tower on the south peak of Mount Beacon.

- Location within New York Location within the United States
- Location: Town of Fishkill, Dutchess County, New York, US
- Coordinates: 41°29′10″N 73°56′29″W
- Type: reservoir
- Primary outflows: Dry Brook
- Catchment area: 0.25 sq mi (0.65 km^{2})
- Basin countries: United States
- Surface area: 20 acres (8.1 ha)
- Water volume: 125,000,000 US gal (470,000 m^{3})
- Surface elevation: 1,285 feet (392 m)

Beacon Reservoir supplies water to the city of Beacon, in Dutchess County, New York, United States. It is located at 1,285 feet (392 m) above sea level in a hollow between Beacon Mountain and Scofield Ridge, in the neighboring Town of Fishkill, very close to the Putnam County line. It was created in 1922 by damming Dry Brook, a tributary of Fishkill Creek.

It holds 125 million US gallons (470,000 m^{3}). A publicly accessible dirt road, frequently used to climb the mountain, runs from the city past it to the summits. No boating or fishing or swimming is allowed in the reservoir. It is the highest lake in Dutchess County.

In 2022, a 34-year-old Beacon resident drowned after trespassing to swim in the reservoir. State police divers recovered his body the next day, blaming the incident on the combination of drugs and alcohol in his system.

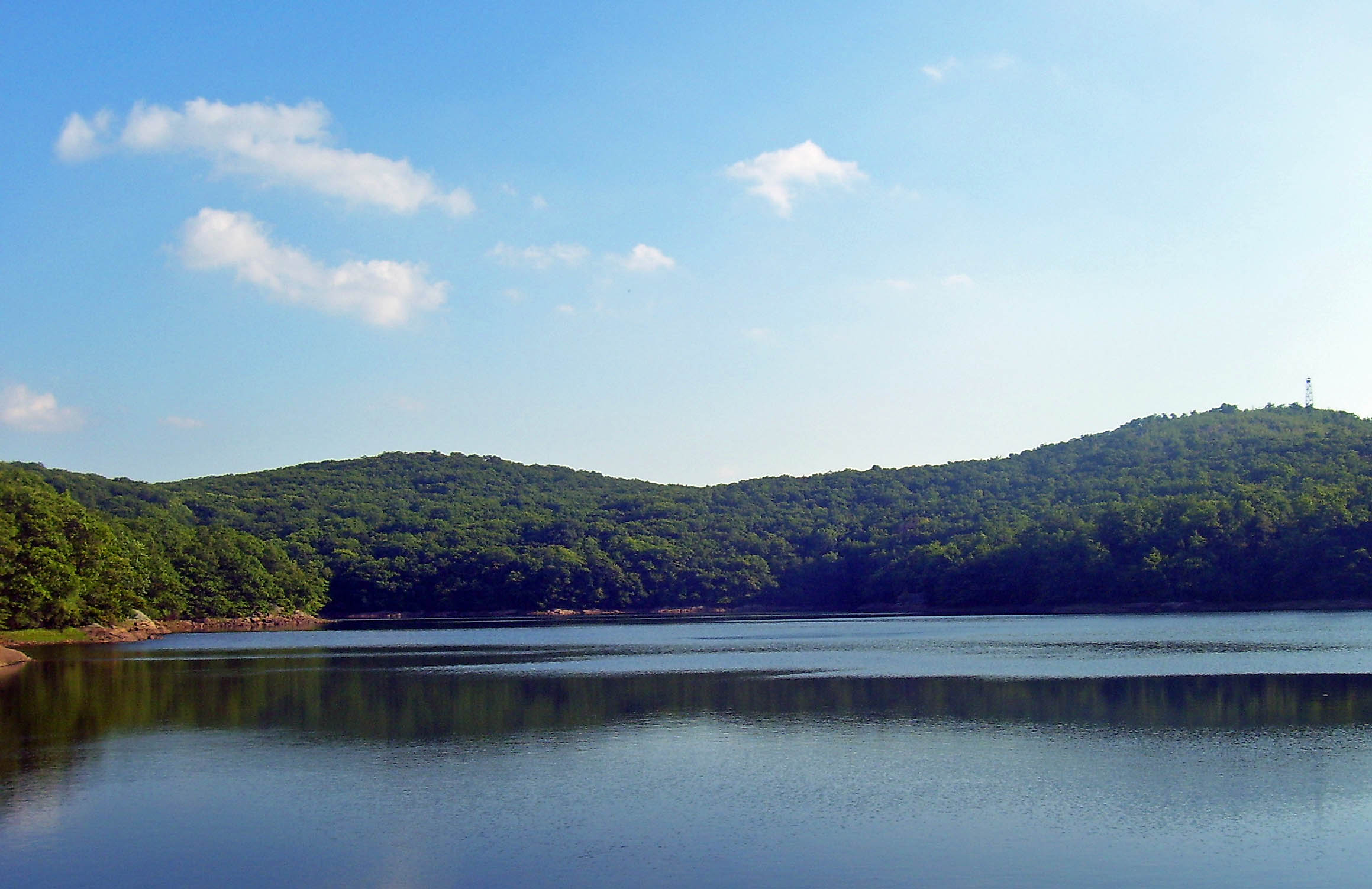
North Beacon Mountain and Scofield Ridge seen from across the reservoir
