= Tioronda Bridge =

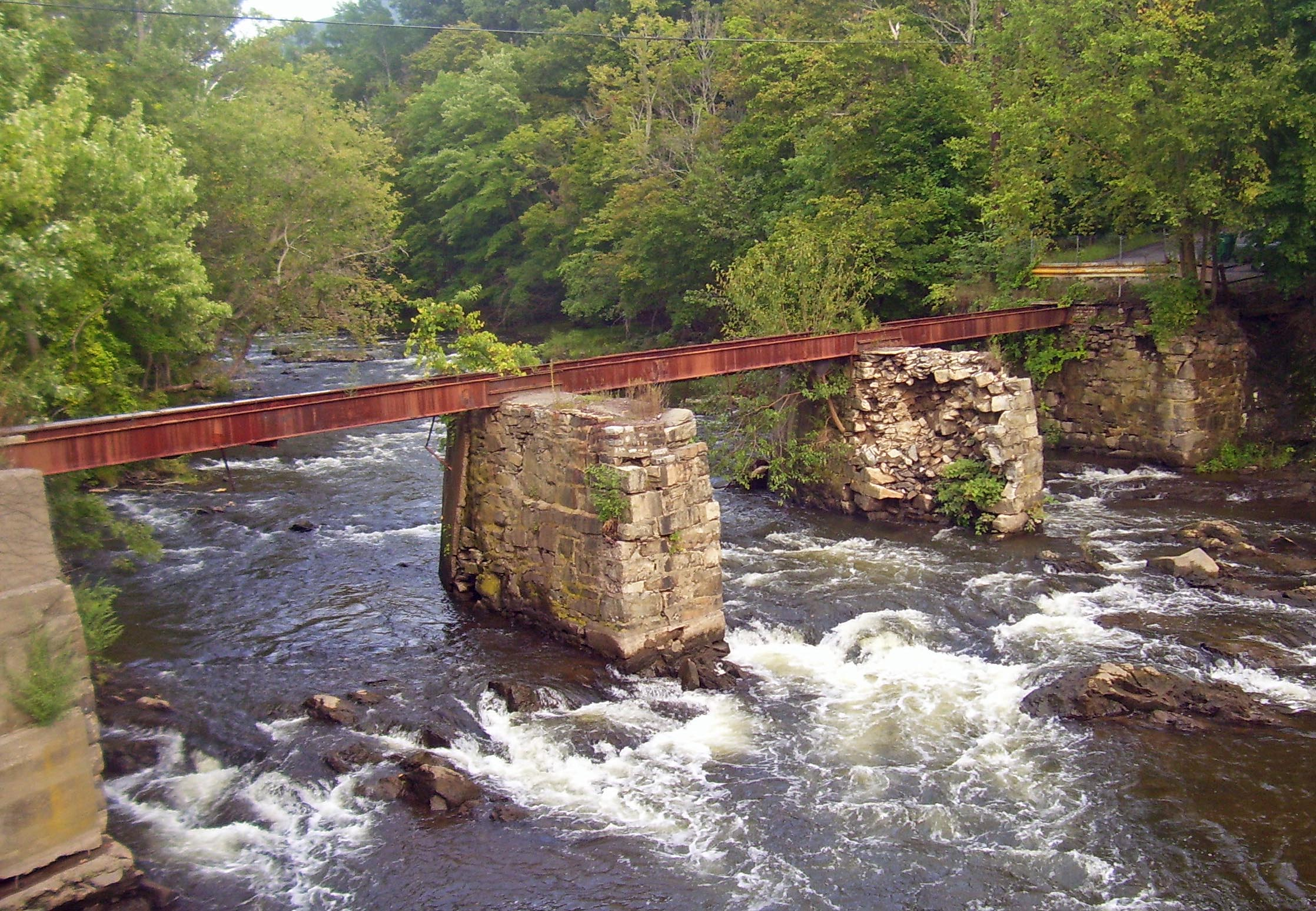
- The remaining abutments and structural elements of the Tioronda Bridge, in 2008.
- Coordinates: 41°29′19″N 73°58′27″W
- Carries: Two lanes of South Avenue
- Crosses: Fishkill Creek
- Locale: Beacon, NY, United States
- Maintained by: City of Beacon

Characteristics
- Design: Bowstring truss
- Total length: 110 feet (34 m)
- Width: 16 feet (4.9 m)

History
- Opened: 1873
- Closed: 1985

The Tioronda Bridge once carried South Avenue in Beacon, New York, across Fishkill Creek. Built between 1869 and 1873 by the Ohio Bridge Company, it was demolished by the city in December 2006. The bridge had been listed on the National Register of Historic Places in 1976, but a decade later had deteriorated to the point that it had to be closed.

Three stone abutments laid in randomly coursed ashlar remain in the river, with one steel stringer and some utility pipes. They supported three spans 34 feet (10 m) in length for a total span of 110 feet (34 m). The bowstrings, arched hollow tubes which once carried the load but later only became guardrails, were the bridge's distinctive structural feature.

It was one of the last remaining bowstring truss bridges in the United States, one of the oldest vehicular bridges in New York and one of the few 19th century iron bridges known to have been based on a patent model. Only one other bridge, over Sandy Creek in Allegheny County, Pennsylvania, is known to have been built from that model as the Ohio Bridge Company ceased operations in 1873, possibly due to that year's economic crisis.

The trusses themselves were preserved for possible ornamental use on a rebuilt bridge. However, it is not known when such rebuilding would take place, and the city's police and fire departments would like a rebuilt bridge to be wider than the current abutments and decking, still in place, would allow for.

== See also ==
- List of bridges documented by the Historic American Engineering Record in New York (state)
- List of bridges on the National Register of Historic Places in New York
- National Register of Historic Places listings in Dutchess County, New York
