= Clove Mountain =

Mountain in New York, United States

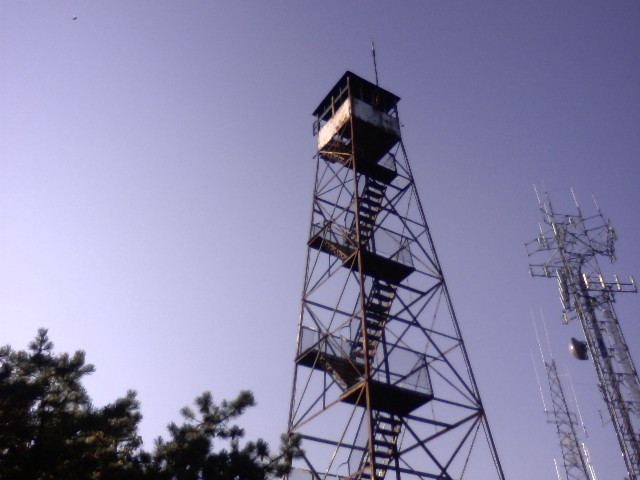
- Fire tower atop Clove Mountain, with cell tower visible.

Highest point
- Elevation: 1,398 ft (426 m)
- Prominence: 615 ft (187 m)
- Coordinates: 41°41′18″N 73°41′35″W

Geography
- Location within New York Location within the United States
- Location: Union Vale, New York, U.S.
- Topo map: USGS Verbank

Clove Mountain is located in Union Vale, Dutchess County, New York, rising to an elevation of 1,398 ft (426 m). It is the town's highest point. It marks the southern extent of the Taconic Mountains and its bedrock is metamorphic, composed of rocks like schist, phyllite, and metagraywacke. Flora and fauna on the mountain are consistent with those found throughout the broader New England Uplands. Rattlesnakes are commonly found on the mountain.

== History ==
In 1933, the New York State Conservation Department, now the Department of Environmental Conservation, erected a steel fire lookout tower on the summit, with an accompanying observer's cabin completed shortly thereafter. The installation of a fire tower on Clove Mountain, as well as on Mount Beacon to the southwest, was formally proposed in 1930, on the basis of inadequate early wildfire detection in Dutchess County. The Clove Mountain tower is a 60-foot (18 m) Aermotor model LS-40. It remained in service through the end of the 1988 fire season, and was officially decommissioned the following year. The first five observers at Clove Mountain, collectively serving from April 1933 until May 1960, were each hired with a starting salary of $100 per month. Both structures survive, but are not actively maintained and are located on private property.

== Geography ==
The mountain forms the western boundary of Clove Valley, or simply "the Clove." Together, the two features have been classified as a Significant Natural Area by the Dutchess County Environmental Management Council. Sites with this designation "significantly contribute to the health, diversity, and enjoyment of the county's resource base." Clove Valley is underlain by limestone and contains several natural springs, as well as the headwaters of Fishkill Creek, a tributary of the Hudson River. The especially prolific Clove Spring reportedly flows at several hundred gallons per minute; it was one of the factors which attracted the first European settlers of Clove Valley in the early 18th century. Several small hamlets cropped up in the valley in the 19th century, during which period extensive iron ore mining took place. In recent times the land has returned to predominantly agricultural use.

It is the site of a Verizon Wireless cell tower and a Dutchess County 911 Radio Repeater.
