= Washington, New York =

Town in Dutchess County, New York, US

- Town
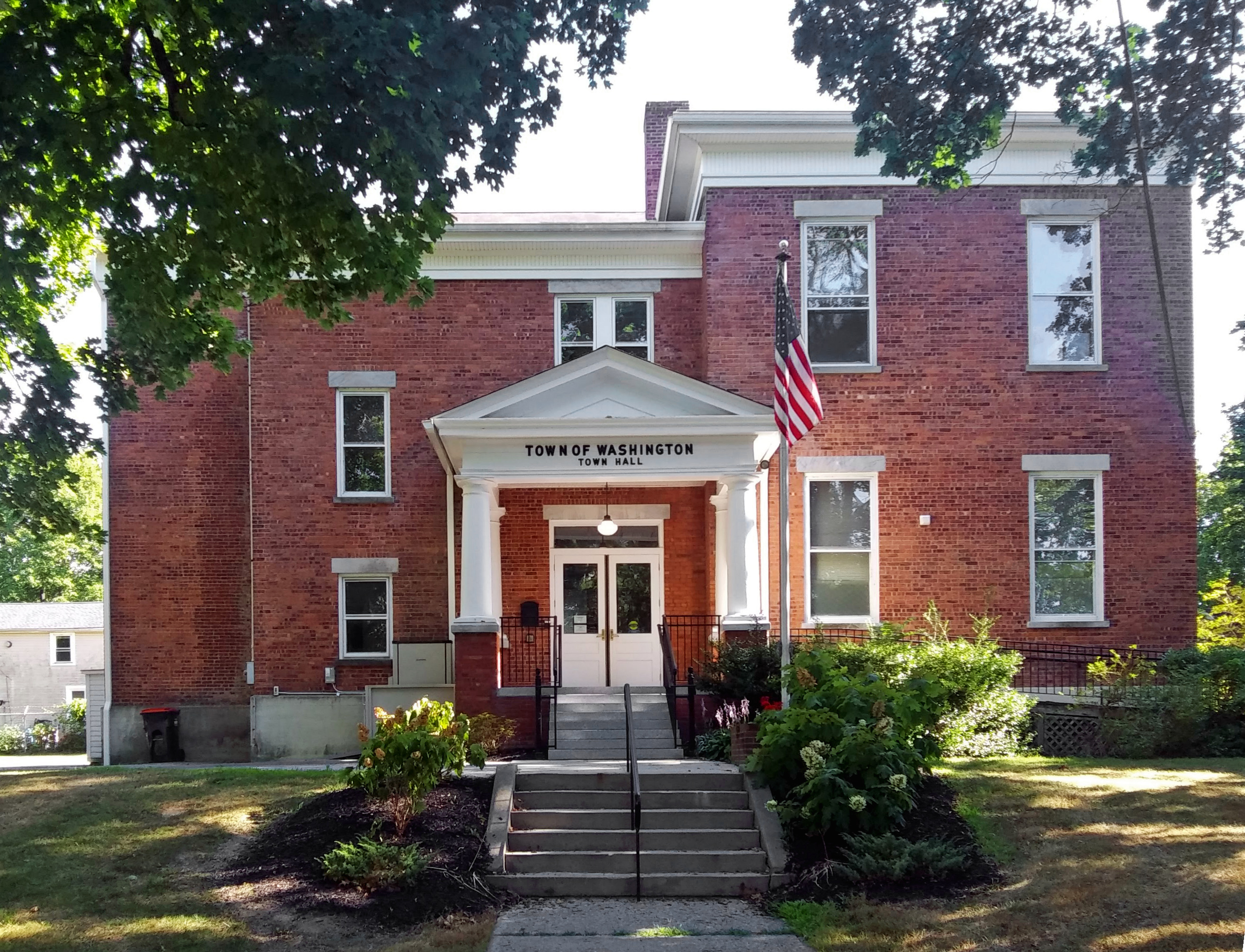
- Town hall, in Millbrook

- Location in Dutchess County and the state of New York
- Coordinates: 41°47′12″N 73°40′53″W
- Country: United States
- State: New York
- County: Dutchess

Government
  - Type: Town Council
  - Town Supervisor: Gary Ciferri (R)
  - Town Council: Members' List: • Al DeBonis (R); • Robert Audia (R); • Stephen Turletes (R); • Michael Murphy (R)

Area
  - Total: 58.88 sq mi (152.51 km^{2})
  - Land: 58.17 sq mi (150.66 km^{2})
  - Water: 0.71 sq mi (1.85 km^{2})
- Elevation: 607 ft (185 m)

Population (2020)
  - Total: 4,522
- Time zone: UTC-5 (Eastern (EST))
  - Summer (DST): UTC-4 (EDT)
- ZIP Codes: 12545 (Millbrook); 12514 (Clinton Corners); 12522 (Dover Plains); 12578 (Salt Point); 12592 (Wassaic)
- FIPS code: 36-027-78388
- GNIS feature ID: 0979601
- Website: www.washingtonny.org

Washington is a town in Dutchess County, New York, United States. The population was 4,522 at the 2020 census. The town is named after George Washington, who passed through the town during the Revolution.

Washington is in the central part of the county, northeast of the city of Poughkeepsie. U.S. Route 44 passes across the town.

== History ==
Prior to the arrival of European settlers, the area was the abode of the sedentary Wappinger Indians.

Although some Dutch had settled in the area, it was the British grant of the Great Nine Partners Patent in 1697 that spurred growth. Lt. Col. Henry Filkins was the largest landowner and his family continued in leadership until forced to flee at the start of the American Revolution.

When Dutchess County was first organized in 1683, it was subdivided into twelve precincts. What is now the towns of Stanford, Clinton, Pleasant Valley, and Washington constituted Charlotte Precinct, later named after Charlotte of Mecklenburg-Strelitz. The town was formed as part of the county reorganization in 1788 as one of the original twelve towns, with the towns of Poughkeepsie and Clinton to the west. The town lost territory in 1793 to form the new town of Stanford.

The Newburgh, Dutchess and Connecticut Railroad (formerly the Dutchess and Columbia Railroad) came through in 1869 cutting north-south across the town, with a station between Mechanic and Hart's Village.

== Geography ==
According to the United States Census Bureau, the town has a total area of 58.9 square miles (152.5 km^{2}), of which 58.2 square miles (150.7 km^{2}) is land and 0.69 square miles (1.8 km^{2}), or 1.21%, is water. Washington is bordered by Pleasant Valley and Clinton to the west, Stanford to the north, Amenia to the east, and Dover and Union Vale to the south. A small part of LaGrange also borders the town.

The main channel of Wappinger Creek flows through the northeast corner of the town, and its East Branch flows through the center of the town.

The Canoe Hills are located on the 2,000 acre Cary Arboretum in the Town of Washington.

=== Communities and locations in Washington ===
- Bloomvale Historic District – A former hamlet, north of Washington's Hollow
- Lithgow – A location in the northeastern corner of the town.
- Littlerest – A location south of Mabbettsville.
- Mabbettsville – A hamlet east of Millbrook.
- Millbrook – The Village of Millbrook is near the center of the town.
- South Millbrook – A location south of Millbrook bordering the town of Union Vale.
- Shunpike – A location north of Millbrook.
- Washington's Hollow – A location by the western town line, where Washington camped.
- Oak Summit

== Demographics ==
Historical population
Census	Pop.	Note	%±
1820	2,882		—
1830	3,036		5.3%
1840	2,833		−6.7%
1850	2,805		−1.0%
1860	2,685		−4.3%
1870	2,792		4.0%
1880	2,797		0.2%
1890	2,766		−1.1%
1900	3,032		9.6%
1910	3,027		−0.2%
1920	2,795		−7.7%
1930	3,042		8.8%
1940	3,080		1.2%
1950	3,427		11.3%
1960	3,695		7.8%
1970	4,407		19.3%
1980	4,382		−0.6%
1990	4,479		2.2%
2000	4,742		5.9%
2010	4,741		0.0%
2020	4,522		−4.6%
U.S. Decennial Census

As of the census of 2000, there were 4,742 people, 1,914 households, and 1,244 families residing in the town. The population density was 80.3 inhabitants per square mile (31.0/km^{2}). There were 2,192 housing units at an average density of 37.1 per square mile (14.3/km^{2}). The racial makeup of the town was 94.69% White, 2.83% African American, 0.06% Native American, 0.65% Asian, 0.02% Pacific Islander, 0.78% from other races, and 0.97% from two or more races. Hispanic or Latino of any race were 3.58% of the population.

There were 1,914 households, out of which 28.1% had children under the age of 18 living with them, 54.1% were married couples living together, 7.7% had a female householder with no husband present, and 35.0% were non-families. 29.5% of all households were made up of individuals, and 11.2% had someone living alone who was 65 years of age or older. The average household size was 2.37 and the average family size was 2.95.

In the town, the population was spread out, with 24.4% under the age of 18, 5.8% from 18 to 24, 26.1% from 25 to 44, 27.2% from 45 to 64, and 16.5% who were 65 years of age or older. The median age was 41 years. For every 100 females, there were 93.7 males. For every 100 females age 18 and over, there were 90.7 males.

The median income for a household in the town was $52,104, and the median income for a family was $69,074. Males had a median income of $45,938 versus $31,411 for females. The per capita income for the town was $32,561. About 2.7% of families and 7.2% of the population were below the poverty line, including 3.5% of those under age 18 and 6.1% of those age 65 or over.

== Notable people ==
- Charles Erwin Booth, Wisconsin State Assemblyman
- Mary Tyler Moore, American actress, producer
- Liam Neeson, actor
- Ric Ocasek, founder of The Cars and music producer
- Melancton Smith, delegate to the Continental Congress
