= Union Vale, New York =

- Town
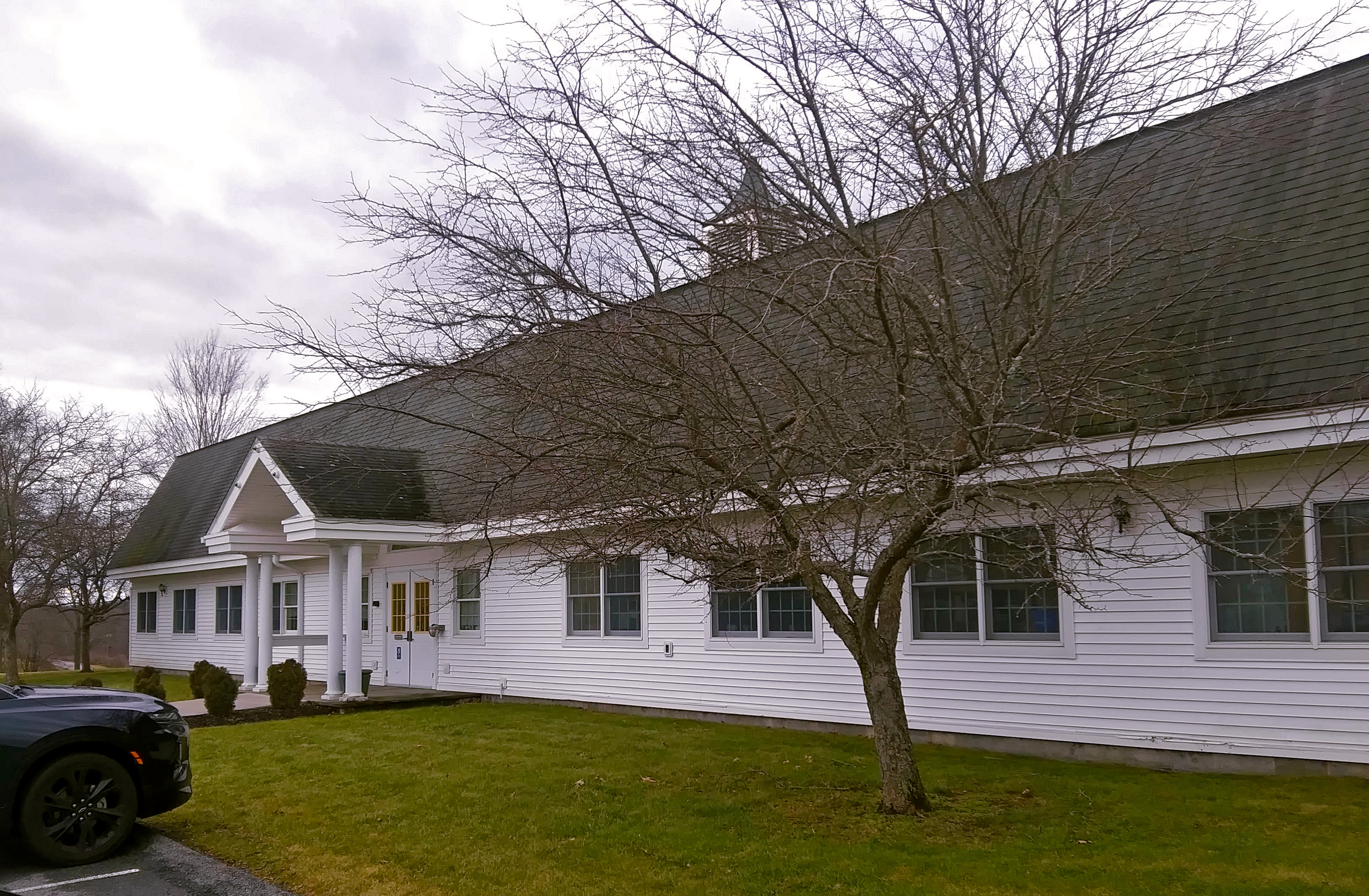
- Town hall

- Seal

- Location of Union Vale, New York
- Coordinates: 41°41′53″N 73°41′57″W
- Country: United States
- State: New York
- County: Dutchess
- Established: 1827

Government
  - Type: Town Council
  - Town Supervisor: Steve Frazier (R)
  - Town Council: Members' List: • Josh Redinger (R); • Kevin Durland (R); • Kevin Harrington (R); • Kevin McGivney (R)

Area
  - Total: 37.81 sq mi (97.92 km^{2})
  - Land: 37.48 sq mi (97.08 km^{2})
  - Water: 0.32 sq mi (0.84 km^{2})
- Elevation: 495 ft (151 m)

Population (2020)
  - Total: 4,558
- Time zone: UTC-5 (Eastern (EST))
  - Summer (DST): UTC-4 (EDT)
- ZIP Codes: 12585 (Verbank); 12540 (Lagrangeville); 12545 (Millbrook); 12570 (Poughquag); 12522 (Dover Plains); 12569 (Pleasant Valley); 12594 (Wingdale)
- FIPS code: 36-027-76166
- GNIS feature ID: 0979573
- Website: unionvaleny.gov

Union Vale is a town in Dutchess County, New York, United States. The population was 4,558 at the 2020 census.

The town is in the south-central part of the county. It is part of the Kiryas Joel-Poughkeepsie–Newburgh, NY Metropolitan Statistical Area as well as the larger New York–Newark–Bridgeport, NY-NJ-CT-PA Combined Statistical Area. The town is 15 miles (24 km) east of the city of Poughkeepsie and 70 miles (110 km) north of New York City.

== History ==
The region was originally part of the Beekman Patent. The town was first settled circa 1716, and was formed in 1827 from the towns of Beekman and LaGrange.

== Geography ==
According to the United States Census Bureau, the town of Union Vale has a total area of 37.8 square miles (97.9 km^{2}), of which 37.5 square miles (97.1 km^{2}) is land and 0.31 square miles (0.8 km^{2}), or 0.86%, is water. The highest point is atop Clove Mountain, at 1,400 feet (430 m) above sea level.

The towns adjacent to Union Vale are Beekman to the south, LaGrange to the west, Washington to the north, and Dover to the east.

New York State Route 55 runs through the southwestern part of the town.

Sky Acres Airport, a general aviation facility, is located in the northwestern part of the town.

The Young Judaea Camp Sprout Lake is located in Verbank, which was established in 1976 as a camp for children grades 2–8, focused on Zionist and Jewish education.

== Parks and recreation ==
Union Vale has two town parks, Tymor Park and Frederick E. Godfrey Memorial Park.

The larger of these is Tymor Park, which encompasses nearly 500 acres (2.0 km^{2}) and is the largest municipal park in the state of New York. It has various recreational facilities such as sports fields, an outdoor pool, playground, pavilions, a senior center, rental halls, equestrian center, camping areas, a fishing pond, tennis courts, basketball courts, volleyball courts, historical sites, and over 12 miles (19 km) of hiking/biking/equestrian trails.

Frederick E. Godfrey Memorial Park (Godfrey Park) is 12 acres (49,000 m^{2}) and includes hiking trails, a playground, basketball court, volleyball court, restrooms, and a baseball/softball field.

There is a private golf course, The Links at Union Vale, on the western side of the town.

== Demographics ==
Historical population
Census	Pop.	Note	%±
1830	1,833		—
1840	1,498		−18.3%
1850	1,552		3.6%
1860	1,502		−3.2%
1870	1,434		−4.5%
1880	1,407		−1.9%
1890	1,033		−26.6%
1900	945		−8.5%
1910	1,097		16.1%
1920	987		−10.0%
1930	1,025		3.9%
1940	1,056		3.0%
1950	970		−8.1%
1960	1,138		17.3%
1970	1,702		49.6%
1980	2,658		56.2%
1990	3,577		34.6%
2000	4,546		27.1%
2010	4,877		7.3%
2020	4,558		−6.5%
U.S. Decennial Census

As of the census of 2000, there were 4,546 people, 1,359 households, and 1,141 families residing in the town. The population density was 120.6 inhabitants per square mile (46.6/km^{2}). There were 1,464 housing units at an average density of 38.8 per square mile (15.0/km^{2}). The racial makeup of the town was 94.24% white, 2.35% African American, 0.11% Native American, 1.19% Asian, 0.04% Pacific Islander, 1.03% from other races, and 1.03% from two or more races. Hispanic or Latino of any race were 3.43% of the population.

There were 1,359 households, out of which 47.0% had children under the age of 18 living with them, 75.9% were married couples living together, 5.6% had a female householder with no husband present, and 16.0% were non-families. 12.9% of all households were made up of individuals, and 4.9% had someone living alone who was 65 years of age or older. The average household size was 3.10 and the average family size was 3.40.

In the town, the population was spread out, with 28.9% under the age of 18, 5.5% from 18 to 24, 30.1% from 25 to 44, 25.6% from 45 to 64, and 9.9% who were 65 years of age or older. The median age was 38 years. For every 100 females, there were 100.7 males. For every 100 females age 18 and over, there were 100.3 males.

The median income for a household in the town was $70,500, and the median income for a family was $72,697. Males had a median income of $51,382 versus $29,643 for females. The per capita income for the town was $24,535. About 0.8% of families and 2.9% of the population were below the poverty line, including 1.7% of those under age 18 and none of those age 65 or over.

== Communities and locations in Union Vale ==
- Camby – A location in the northeastern part of the town.
- Chestnut Ridge – A location at the eastern town line.
- Clove – A hamlet near the town center.
- Clove Mountain – An elevation west of Clove village.
- Crouses Store – A location in the southwestern section of the town.
- LaGrangeville or (La Grangeville) – A hamlet in the southwestern corner of the town that Union Vale shares with the towns of LaGrange and Beekman. With the zip code of 12540.
- Hoxie Corner – A location southwest of Verbank.
- North Clove – A location northeast of Clove.
- Pleasant Ridge – A location in the southeastern part of the town.
- Verbank – A hamlet near the northern town line.
- Verbank Village – A hamlet west of Verbank.

=== Oswego ===
Oswego is a former hamlet, later a ghost town, in the northwestern part of the town, north of Lagrangeville and south of Verbank, now part of the hamlet of Moores Mills, shared with the town of LaGrange. It is located directly southeast of Sky Acres airport. A historic marker set by the state government marks the spot of the former hamlet. The Oswego Meeting House and Friends' Cemetery was listed on the National Register of Historic Places in 1989.

This ghost town shares a name with a city in the northern part of the state, Oswego. It is also referred to as "Quaker City" in the official New York State Gazetteer maintained and published by the New York State Department of Health, which includes numerous defunct hamlets and towns, some with alternate or archaic spellings.
