= City of Poughkeepsie Transit =

Bus system serving Poughkeepsie, New York

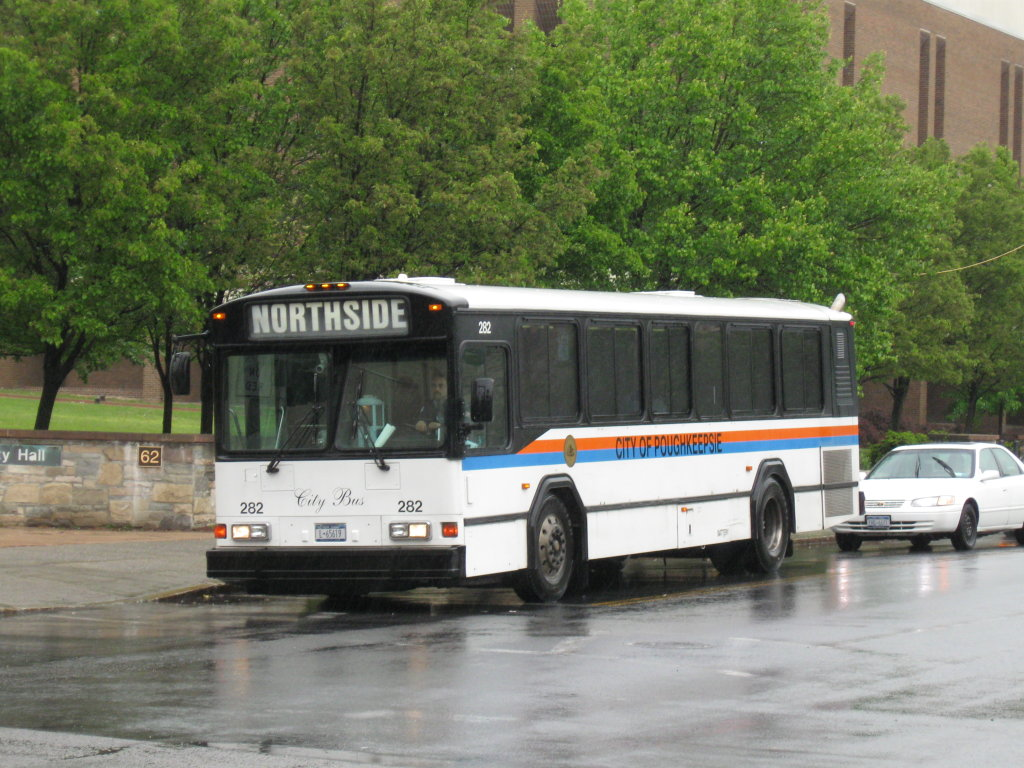
- Gillig Phantom #282 returns from the Northside line in downtown Poughkeepsie.
- Parent: City of Poughkeepsie
- Headquarters: 26 Howard Street; Poughkeepsie, NY 12601
- Locale: Poughkeepsie, NY
- Service type: Local bus service
- Routes: 5
- Fleet: 8 (2009 figures)
- Daily ridership: 1,522 (weekday); 756 (Saturday)
- Website: City of Poughkeepsie Transit

City of Poughkeepsie Transit was the municipal bus system serving the City of Poughkeepsie, New York as well as parts of the Town of Poughkeepsie and Hyde Park. The system operated five different regular routes and a service which served students at Poughkeepsie Middle School and Poughkeepsie High School. All buses ran mostly as unidirectional loops and met at the corner of Main and Market streets adjacent to the west end of the former Main Mall. Buses ran hourly middays, every 30–45 minutes in peak periods.

Service within these areas is now provided by the Dutchess County Public Transit system, a division of the Dutchess County Division of Public Transit.

== Routes ==
The five main routes were:

- Main Street: Served businesses on Main Street, the commercial strip off of Route 44 in Arlington, Vassar College, and the western end of the city including the train station which served Metro-North and Amtrak.
- Southside: Served residential areas in the southern part of Poughkeepsie as well as the northern commercial strip on Route 9.
- Northside: Served residential areas in the northern part of Poughkeepsie, Dutchess Community College, St. Francis Hospital, and the southern part of Hyde Park to that town's Stop & Shop supermarket. Prior to 2004, was two separate routes (Northside and Hospital), the merger of which was met with much objection.
- Galleria: A combination of the Southside and LOOP A routes, served residential areas in Poughkeepsie before continuing on Route 9 to serve Poughkeepsie Galleria and South Hills Mall.
- Shopper's Special: A weekday-only variant of the Main Street route that served the commercial strip in Arlington, but via residential areas rather than the commercial Main Street.
