= Main Mall =

Former shopping plaza in Poughkeepsie, New York

Coordinates: 41.703590°N 73.927406°W

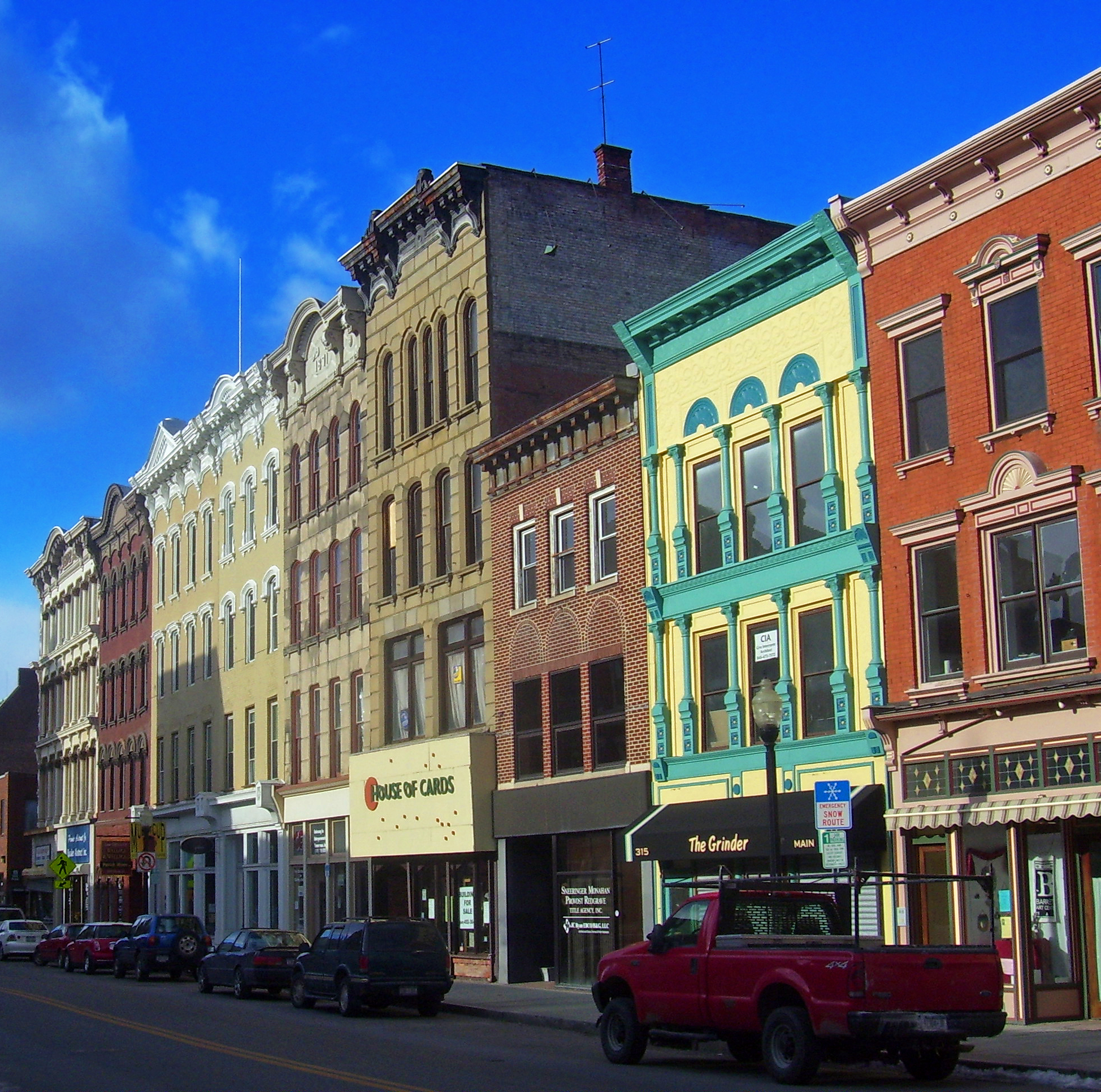
The historic buildings of Main Mall Row.

The Main Mall was an outdoor pedestrian shopping plaza in downtown Poughkeepsie, New York, and was in existence from 1973 until 2001. An urban renewal project designed with the intention of stopping the decline of the central business district of downtown City of Poughkeepsie, the mall was created by blocking off a section of Main Street from Market to Catherine and Academy Streets to automobile traffic.

== History ==
=== Early years ===
The Main Mall was the centerpiece of a project which also included the improvement of US 9 in the City of Poughkeepsie city limits to a freeway-standard highway and construction of The Arterial, a combination of Routes 44 and 55 into two one-way, three lane highways a block to the north and south of Main Street. At the time of the project, downtown City of Poughkeepsie was faced with the competition of the Poughkeepsie Plaza Mall on Route 9, the Hudson Plaza Mall directly across Route 9 from the Poughkeepsie Plaza Mall, as well as Dutchess Mall ten miles south Route 9 in Fishkill. Unlike the City of Poughkeepsie's Main St shopping district, all the malls outside of the City of Poughkeepsie had abundant free parking.

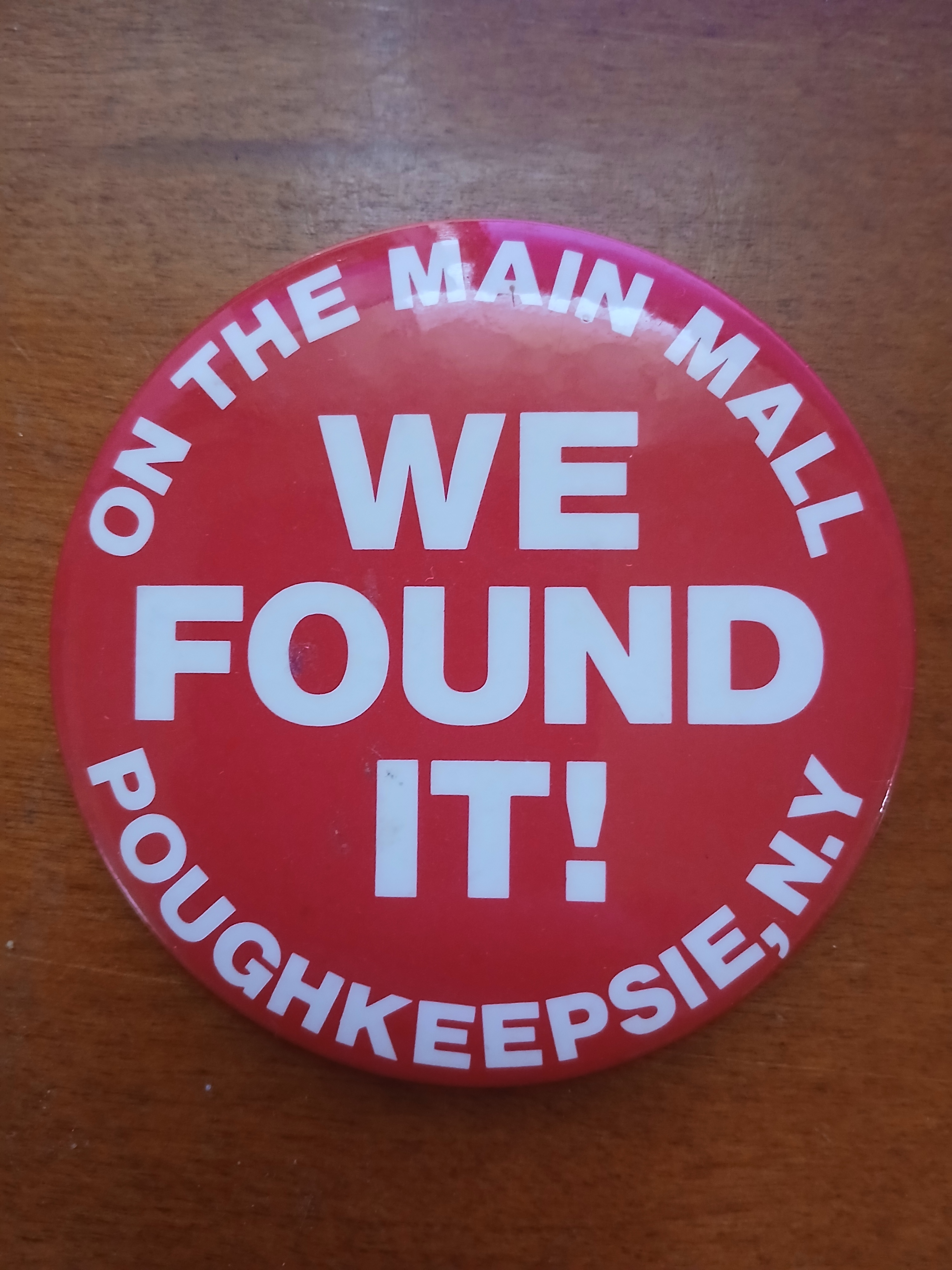
Promotional Button for the Main Mall

In the first years after its opening, many ceremonies, promotions, and festivals took place on the mall, with it also being the site of many United States Bicentennial festivities as well. These occurrences softened the sting of Dutchess Mall's presence in the early years of both venues. The moving of the de facto bus station and the transfer point for the former City of Poughkeepsie Transit and the current Dutchess County Public Transit bus systems to the Market Street end of the mall also softened the sting to some degree.

Even with this minor success, the mall was beset with various access problems. The number of legal parking spots in the vicinity of the Main Mall were too few to handle even a moderate number of people. Delays in the construction of the Route 44/55 arterial pushed its finish date to 1979 which, coupled with the closure of Main Street in that area, made access to the area very difficult and led to frequent congestion of side streets not equipped to handle such traffic.

=== Decline ===
In the years after the new mall's debut, many retailers either closed their downtown locations or relocated to the suburbs. This exacerbated problems with vagrancy and homelessness around Main Street.

The opening of South Hills Mall in 1974, an indoor mall located in the Town of Poughkeepsie five miles south of the Main Mall, precipitated a decline of the Main Mall and surrounding City of Poughkeepsie downtown area over the following decade. South Hills Mall, located off Route 9, drew both shoppers and businesses away from central City of Poughkeepsie's downtown.

The closure of the Luckey Platt & Company Department Store on Academy Street in early 1981, one of the City of Poughkeepsie's iconic retailers, dealt a final blow to the Main Mall. The loss of this major commercial anchor, as seen with other indoor and strip malls, accelerated the decline of the Main Mall in the 1980s. Later that year, the Dutchess County Department of Social Services relocated their offices to the South Hills Mall on the opposite side from the former Luckey Platt building. The departure of the county government offices further evidenced the shifting vitality from the City of Poughkeepsie downtown to the suburban mall.

In addition, a second shopping mall, the Poughkeepsie Galleria, also located in the Town of Poughkeepsie was opened in 1987.

=== Later years ===
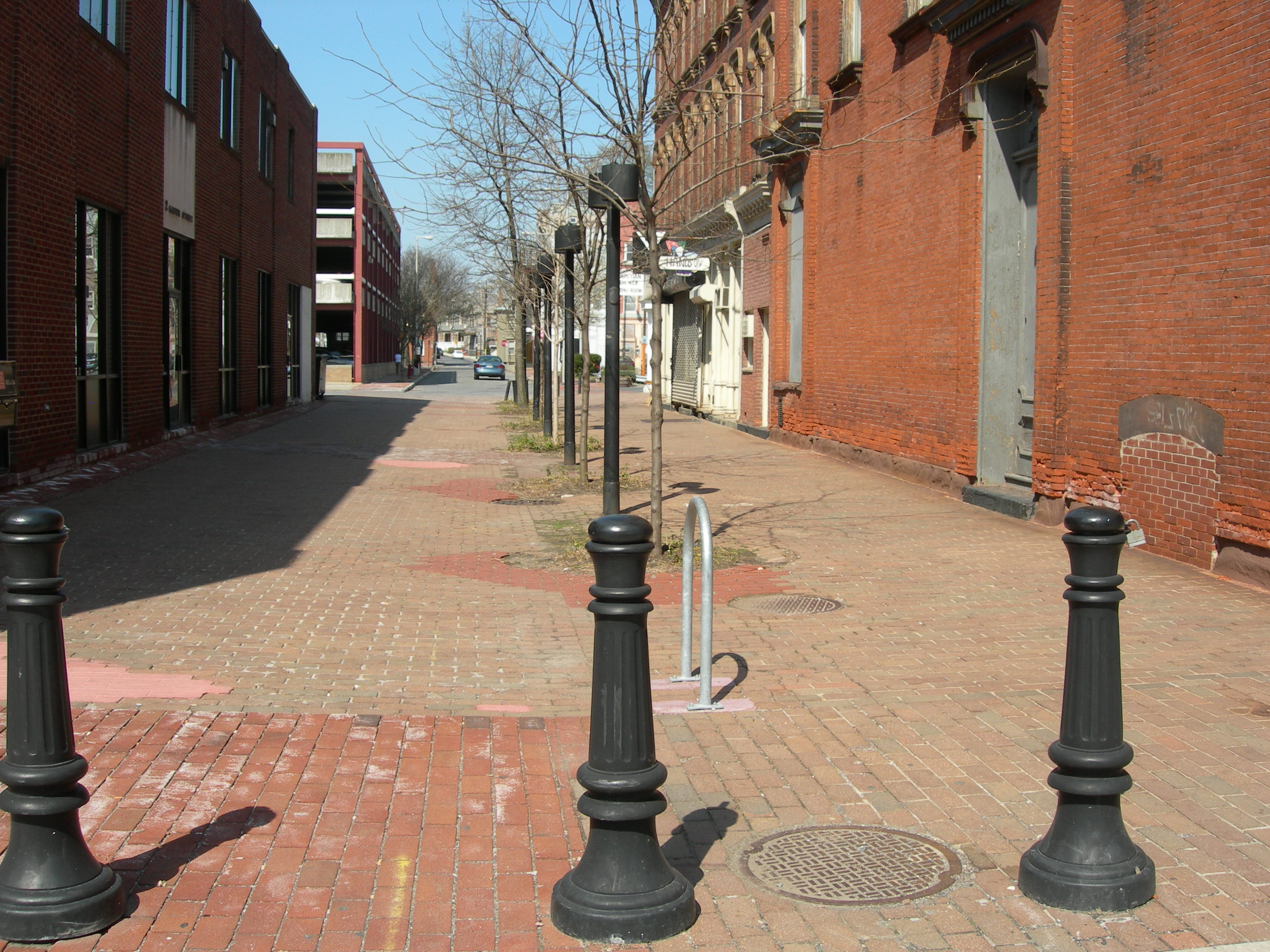
Some side streets are still paved in the manner of the former Main Mall.

With the election of mayor Colette Lafuente in 1995, the future of the Main Mall was brought into question. Lafuente had a plan to revitalize the City of Poughkeepsie by a process that would replace blighted areas with new housing and businesses. A native to the area, Lafuente had an intention to plant the seeds that would return Main Street to its prominence and such a plan would involve the elimination of the Main Mall.

Governor George Pataki visited Poughkeepsie on September 15, 2000 to announce a $1 million dollar state grant to reopening the section of Main Street to vehicles.

In early 2001, the Main Mall was closed and Main Street between Catharine/Academy and Market streets was reconstructed as a two-lane street with ample on-street parking; the remaining business in what had been the mall stayed open during the construction. The Main Mall officially went into history in November 2001 when Main Street was once again made whole. With the removal of the mall downtown Poughkeepsie began its recovery and is now attracting new businesses, stores, restaurants and galleries.
