= Dutchess Mall =

Coordinates: 41.519152°N 73.892463°W

- Entrance to the mall in 2004
- Location: Fishkill, New York, United States
- Opened: August 1974
- Closed: 2001 demolished 2006
- Developer: National Merritt Inc
- Manager: Dagar Group
- Num. of stores: 50+ (1974-2001)
- Num. of anchor tenants: 2 (1974-1995)
- Floors: 1 (2 in J.W. Mays until Jamesway opened and sealed off 2nd floor.)

Dutchess Mall was an enclosed shopping mall in Fishkill, New York, that operated from 1974 to 2001. In 2006, the main portion of the mall was demolished and replaced with a Home Depot except for the Jamesway and Service Merchandise anchor store buildings. In August 2021, a new site for Dutchess Community College moved into the Jamesway space.

== History ==
=== Dutchess Mall (1974–2001) ===
The Dutchess Mall opened during 1974 as the first mall in Dutchess County, and the first enclosed shopping mall between Yonkers and Albany. The mall occupied a portion of a site used during the American Revolutionary War by the Fishkill Encampment and Supply Depot, which has been listed on the National Register of Historic Places since the Dutchess Mall's opening. The Fishkill Encampment was previously scheduled for conversion to a national park, but the plan was rejected.

Original anchors of the mall included Mays and Luckey Platt, two local department stores. Others included Drug World pharmacy, as well as Radio Shack and Waldenbooks. The Dutchess Mall was often unable to attract many well-known tenants, due to persistent rumors of a larger mall being built nearby. The rumored mall, which would have been anchored by Macy's, was never built. Eventually, a portion of its retail space was replaced with a satellite campus of Marist College. Other problems of the mall included an outdated mall design, competition from the nearby Poughkeepsie Galleria and South Hills Mall, and the beginning of big box type retail.

Mays, which closed following their 1982 bankruptcy, was replaced with Gaynes. Gaynes, in turn, was converted to a Jamesway discount shop during 1988, which closed following their liquidation in 1995.

Luckey Platt closed sometime in the 1970s and it was replaced with Service Merchandise. Service Merchandise closed on December 24, 1996.

There was also movie theater in the mall with four screens that opened in 1980. It closed in August 1997.

In 2001, the mall closed with only the flea market in the old Jamesway location remaining, and the rest of the mall sealed off entirely.

Interior of Dutchess Flea Market in 2004 at the Service Merchandise location.

=== Redevelopment (2001–2021) ===
In 1999, plans were announced to convert the mall into a business community named Hudson Valley Metro Centre. The project would have included office tenants, a recreational facility, child care, and restaurants. Due to high startup costs, the plan was abandoned.

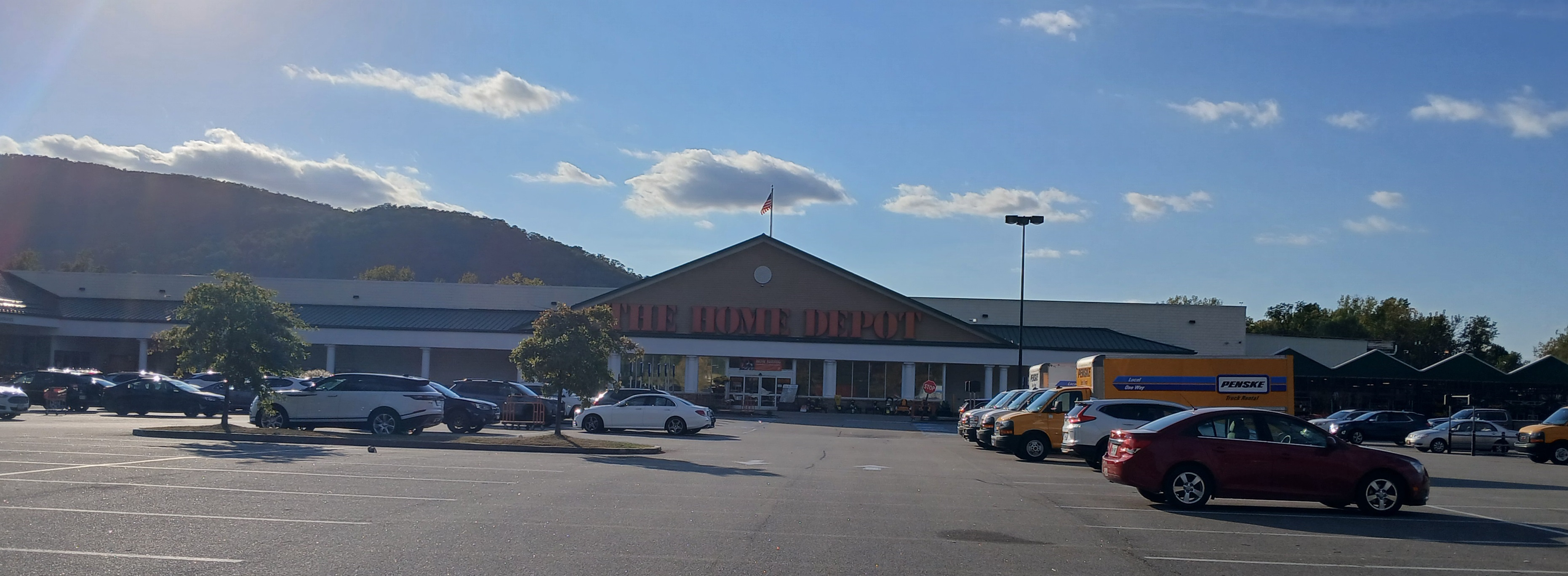
The Home Depot the replaced the main section of the mall, pictured in 2024.

In 2003, a group of designers from New York devised a plan to convert Dutchess Mall into a women's prison. This plan was one of the finalists in "Dead Malls", a competition created by the Los Angeles Forum for Architecture and Urban Design, however the plan was never realized.

The main section of the mall was eventually demolished after the 2001 closure and replaced with a Home Depot, which opened on July 5, 2006.

As of 2026, besides the Home Depot and the DCC satellite campus, the property also has a McDonald's and a Citizen's Bank branch occupying space toward the front of the property. There also used to be a branch of the Hudson Valley Credit Union and a Shop Rite. Both of these buildings are now also abandoned. Behind the property is a twelve hole golf course.

==== Service Merchandise building ====
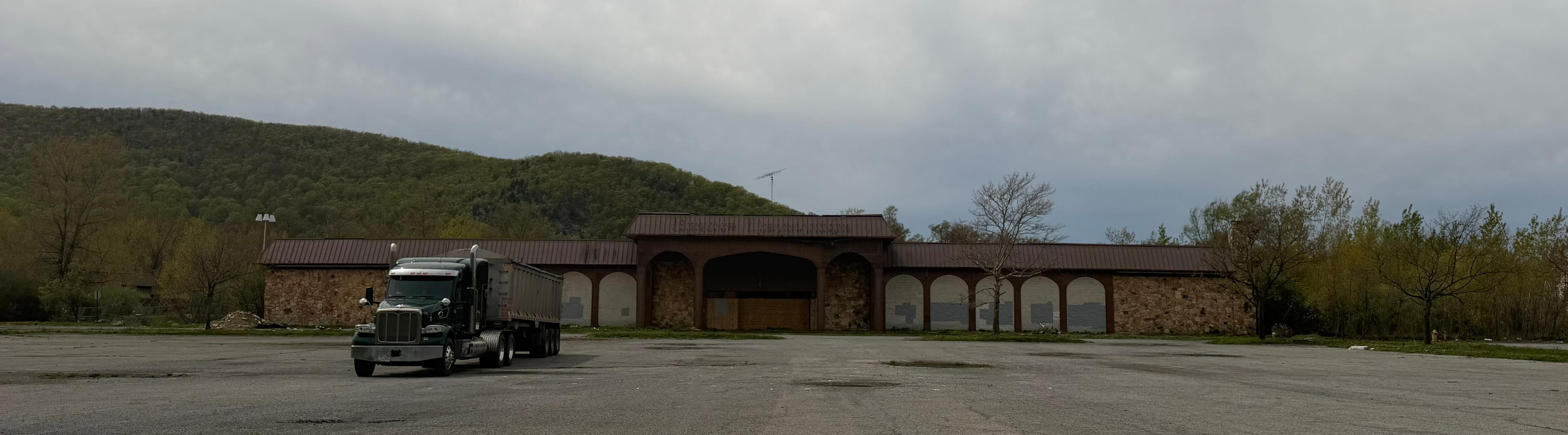
The abandoned Service Merchandise building as of 2026

After the closure of Service Merchandise in 1996, the space was soon replaced with the Dutchess Flea Market. With both anchor stores gone, the other shops began ending operations as well, and by 2001 only the flea market remained, with the rest of the mall sealed off entirely.

In 2007, the Dutchess Mall and the flea market was the subject of a documentary named Fish Kill Flea.

As of 2026, the Service Merchandise building is abandoned, though plans are in place to redevelop the building into a 350,000 square foot distribution facility.

==== Jamesway building ====
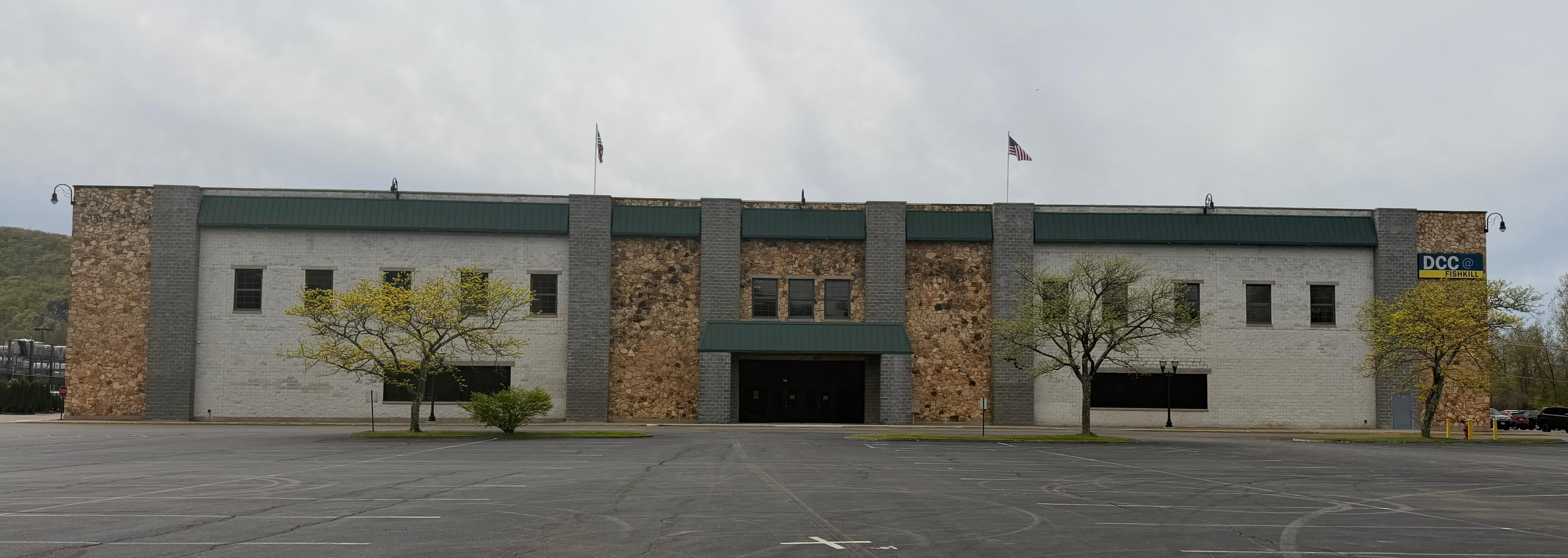
Former Jamesway building in 2026, now the home of DCC@Fishkill

From 2014 to 2019, the Jamesway building served as the site of Dutchess Marketplace, a flea market with a variety of vendors. In August 2019, Dutchess Community College announced plans to open a campus in the former Jamesway building, replacing the Hollowbrook campus in Wappinger. The campus was slated to open in fall 2020, but due to the COVID-19 pandemic, the opening was pushed back. A ribbon cutting ceremony to mark the opening of the new campus was held on June 10, 2021.

On October 6, 2023, First Lady of the United States Jill Biden toured the facility, particularly the new Mechatronics lab.

As of December 2023, the building that now houses DCC is still owned by J.W. May's, who had a store there before Jamesway and is now a real estate company owning the real estate of their former stores. It is not connected to the May Company.
