= Main Mall Row =

Commercial buildings in Poughkeepsie, New York

- U.S. National Register of Historic Places
- U.S. Historic district
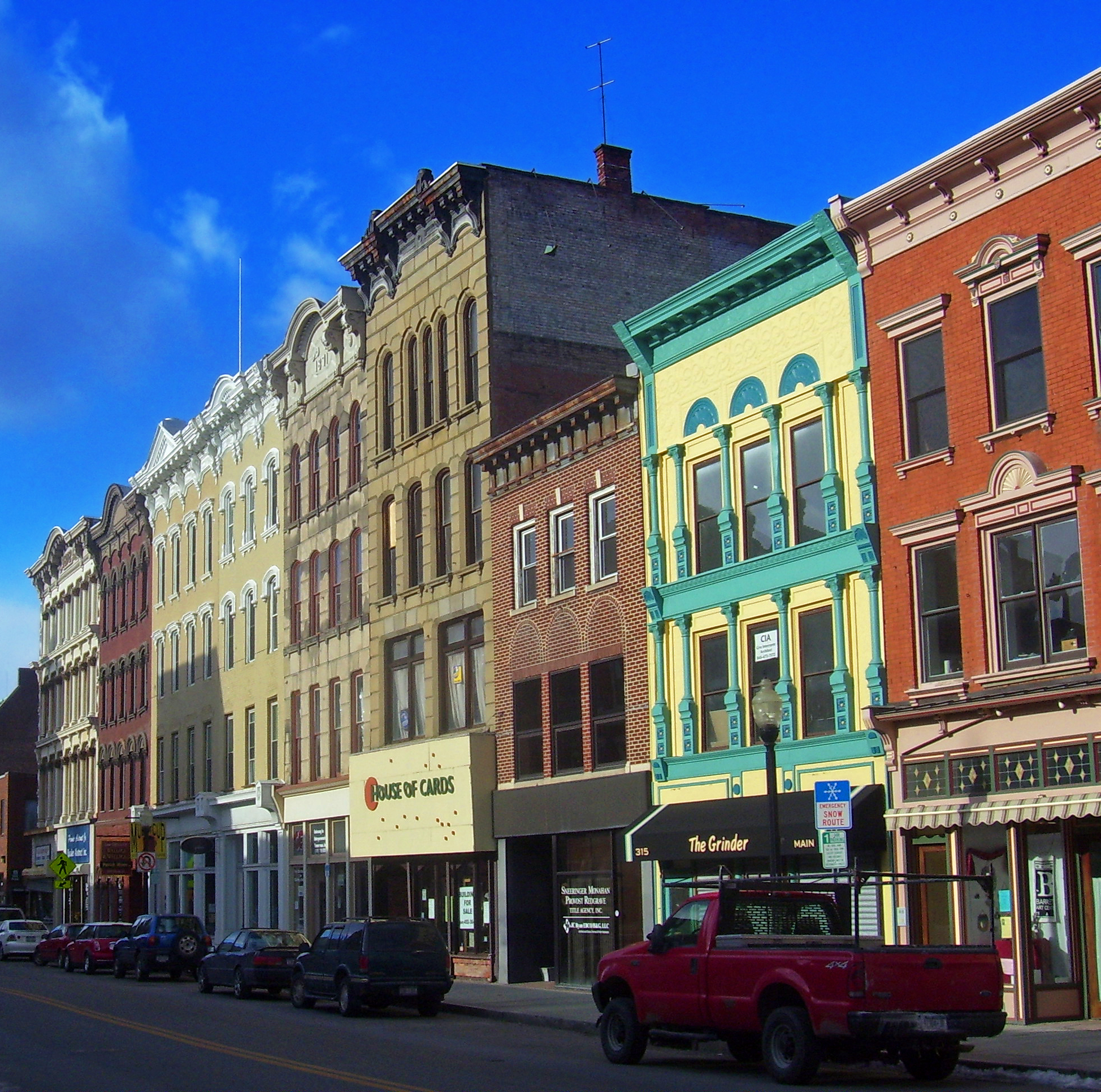
- Buildings of Main Mall Row viewed from east on Main Street, 2008
- Location: Poughkeepsie, New York, U.S.
- Coordinates: 41°42′13″N 73°55′36″W
- Built: 1870s
- Architectural style: Victorian Renaissance
- NRHP reference No.: 82001148 (original); 100009967 (increase)

Significant dates
- Added to NRHP: November 26, 1982
- Boundary increase: February 26, 2024

Main Mall Row is an adjoining group of nine commercial buildings along the northeast corner of the intersection of Main and Garden streets in downtown Poughkeepsie, New York, United States. They were mostly built after a fire in 1870 destroyed the previous buildings on the site. The new structures were three-to-four story buildings in the Renaissance Revival style, many with ornamental touches such as bracketed cornices, paneled friezes, arcaded facades and molded lintels. 315 Main Mall, at the east end, has an ornate cast iron facade. They are considered among the most architecturally significant commercial buildings in the city, and are still in use as stores today. The building at 3-9 Garden Street retains its original storefronts. The row, as with many of the other buildings in downtown Poughkeepsie, was added to the National Register of Historic Places in 1982.

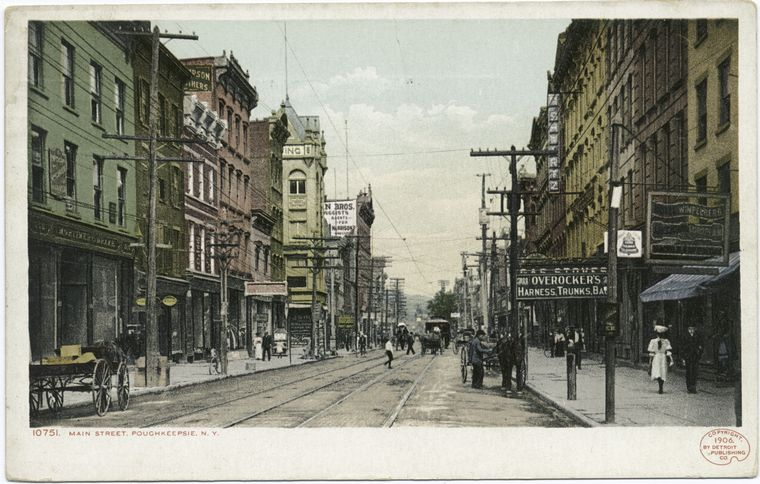
Undated postcard of the district

Their current name comes from Main Mall, the city's attempt to establish a pedestrian mall in the area, the two blocks of Main between Market and Academy streets, during the 1970s. With the nearby Luckey, Platt & Company Department Store, a commercial mainstay of the city, losing customers to suburban shopping malls, city planners thought they could sustain downtown by offering shoppers a similar experience. In 1973 the two blocks were closed to vehicle traffic. However, the decline of the downtown continued as most shoppers continued to choose the malls, especially after Luckey Platt closed in 1980. The city reopened the street and ended Main Mall in 2001, helping to revive commercial and residential development in the area.

== See also ==
- National Register of Historic Places listings in Poughkeepsie, New York
