= Church Building =

- U.S. National Register of Historic Places
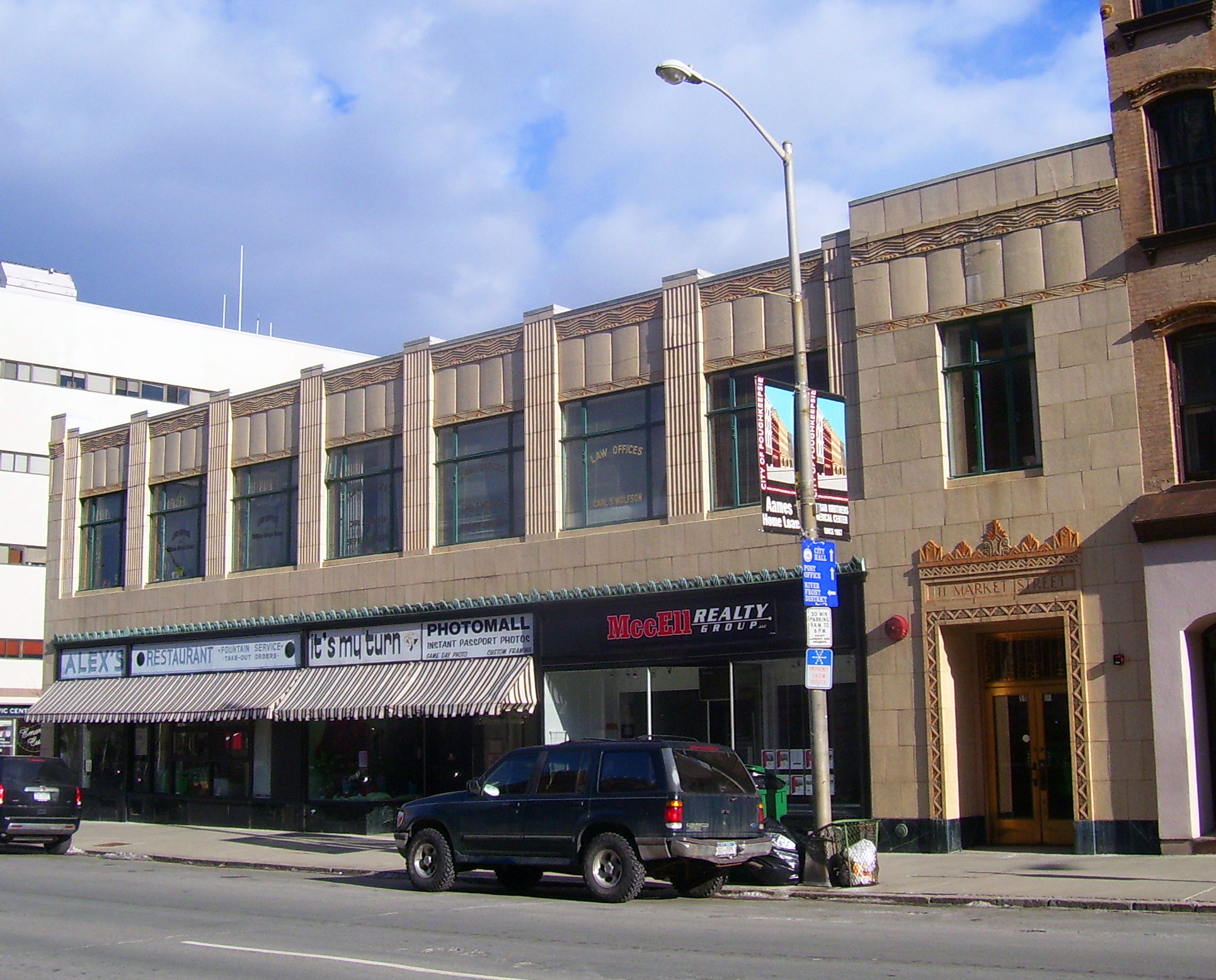
- Building in 2008
- Location: Poughkeepsie, New York
- Coordinates: 41°42′14″N 73°55′44″W
- Built: 1932
- Architectural style: Art Deco
- NRHP reference No.: 82005071
- Added to NRHP: 1982

The Church Building is located at the corner of Main and Market Streets in downtown Poughkeepsie, New York, United States, just across Market Street from the Dutchess County Court House, and north of the Bardavon Theater. It is a complex of stores and other commercial space, so named because it is owned by the Reformed Dutch Church of Poughkeepsie, which has owned the land since 1717 and benefits from the rental income. It was the western anchor of Main Mall, the city's former pedestrian mall.

It is considered the best example of Art Deco architecture in the city, where most commercial buildings predate the style's popularity in the 1930s. The two-story building has tilework designs suggesting Native American aesthetics. Other ornamental touches associated with Art Deco include, floral and patterned metalwork along the shop cornices, and polished green and black marble inside. There are also ribbed pilasters between the windows and a multicolored chevron pattern above and below the roof parapets.

The interior is intact, although some of the offices and shops have been modernized. One of the former does remain in its original condition. The building was added to the National Register of Historic Places in 1982.

== See also ==
- National Register of Historic Places listings in Poughkeepsie, New York
