= Dutchess County Public Transit =

Bus service

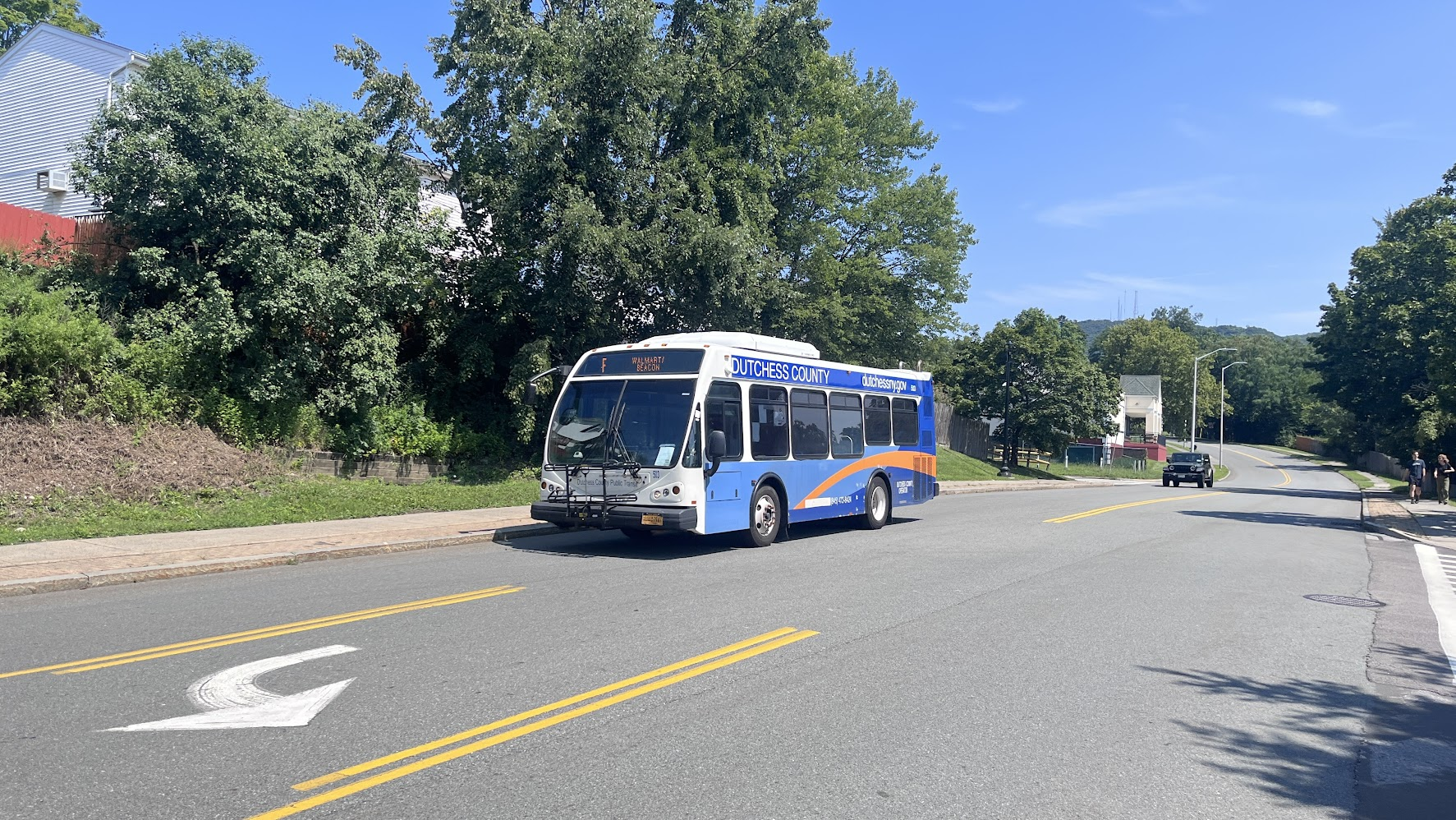
- #503 is seen transporting passengers on Route F to the Beacon MNRR station
- Parent: Dutchess County Division of Public Transit
- Founded: Early 1970s
- Headquarters: 14 Commerce Street; Poughkeepsie, NY 12603
- Locale: Dutchess County
- Service area: Entire Dutchess County with service focused in the Central, southern and western part of the county
- Service type: Local and rural bus service
- Routes: 16 fixed routes, 6 dial-a-ride services, 4 flex routes and 3 RailLink shuttles
- Hubs: Beacon Intermodal Center, Poughkeepsie Transit Hub
- Fleet: 58 (2009 figures)
- Daily ridership: 3,500
- Fuel type: Diesel, Diesel-Hybrid
- Operator: First Transit
- Chief executive: John C. Andoh, CCTM
- Website: Dutchess County Division of Mass Transit

The Dutchess County Public Transit is the bus service provided by the Dutchess County Division of Public Transit in Dutchess County, New York. Dutchess County Public Transit provides a variety of bus services throughout Dutchess County ranging from fixed-route services, centered primarily along the Route 9 corridor, rail shuttles to/from Hudson Line stations, and demand response/deviated flex services.

LOOP (the previous name), and the Division of Public Transit, was created in the early 1970s to assume a variety of private line runs that had served various parts of the county.

== Routes ==
Dutchess County Public Transit provides service along six routes in a hub-and-spoke system from Poughkeepsie. In the past, routes ran to the far northeastern reaches of the county (to North East and Pine Plains), but these routes have been removed from the service area because of lack of ridership.

=== Regular routes ===
- All routes operate Monday-Saturday unless otherwise noted. Routes A, B and H are the only ones that operate Sunday.
- The one-way fare is $1.75. Transfers are only available to/from routes within the City of Poughkeepsie for 30 cents.

Poughkeepsie note: Unless otherwise noted, outbound buses originate at the Poughkeepsie Transit Hub near the Mid-Hudson Civic Center (Main & Market), then operate to the Metro-North/Amtrak station, then to their respective destinations. Westbound buses stop at the Poughkeepsie Transit Hub, then operate to the Metro-North station where they terminate.

Route	Terminals		Major streets	Notes
A	Poughkeepsie	Fishkill	U.S. Route 9	One midday roundtrip operates express service as follows: Southbound, nonstop Poughkeepsie-Fishkill; Northbound, nonstop The Shoppes at South Hills-Poughkeepsie.; One evening round trip is extended to the Beacon Post Office.; Sunday service effective February 5, 2017
B	Poughkeepsie	Beacon; Post Office	Route 9 Route 9D	Service operates via both The Shoppes at South Hills and Fishkill.; 2 midday round trips terminate/originate at The Shoppes at South Hills.; Sunday service effective February 5, 2017
C	Poughkeepsie	Tivoli; Post Office	Route 9 Route 109; Route 9G	Most trips operate via Fulton St/Dutchess Community College/Dorsey Lane; 2 weekday northbound trips terminate in Rhinebeck, with 1 southbound originating.
D	Poughkeepsie	Wassaic; Taconic Developmental Services	US Route 44; Route 343	2 round trips terminate in Wassaic; 4 round trips terminate in Millbrook
D	Poughkeepsie	Millbrook; Eastern Dutchess Government Center	US Route 44; Route 343	2 round trips terminate in Wassaic; 4 round trips terminate in Millbrook
E	Poughkeepsie	Pawling; Chamber of Commerce	Cannon St (westbound only); Route 55	5 trips per day to/from Pawling. 3 trips per day extended to/from Wingdale (plus one on-demand trip).; No service east of Lagrangeville on Sundays; Additional westbound trips run from Route 55 and Commerce St to Poughkeepsie.; Local service in Pawling is available by reservation.
E	Poughkeepsie	Wingdale; Cousins Cafe	Cannon St (westbound only); Route 55	5 trips per day to/from Pawling. 3 trips per day extended to/from Wingdale (plus one on-demand trip).; No service east of Lagrangeville on Sundays; Additional westbound trips run from Route 55 and Commerce St to Poughkeepsie.; Local service in Pawling is available by reservation.
F	Beacon; Post Office	Hopewell Junction; Unity Plaza	Route 52	Weekday service patterns: Beacon Post Office ↔ Unity Plaza via Walmart (4 east, 5 west); Beacon ↔ Walmart (2 east, 1 west); Saturday service is 3 round trips between Fishkill and Beacon.; All trips that serve Poughkeepsie only serve the Poughkeepsie Transit Hub and not the train station.; No Sunday service.
F	Beacon; Post Office	Fishkill; Walmart	Route 52	Weekday service patterns: Beacon Post Office ↔ Unity Plaza via Walmart (4 east, 5 west); Beacon ↔ Walmart (2 east, 1 west); Saturday service is 3 round trips between Fishkill and Beacon.; All trips that serve Poughkeepsie only serve the Poughkeepsie Transit Hub and not the train station.; No Sunday service.
G	Beacon Train Station		Main Street	Serves A counterclockwise Loop; Trip to Dutchess County Stadium (Fishkill) by request
H	Poughkeepsie	Dutchess Community College	Route 9	College Connection Shuttle; City of Poughkeepsie route
J	Poughkeepsie	FDR Estate	Route 9	Northside Shuttle; City of Poughkeepsie route
K	Poughkeepsie	Poughkeepsie Galeria	Route 9	Southside Shuttle; City of Poughkeepsie route
L	Poughkeepsie	Adams Fairacre Farms	Main Street Route 44	Main Street Shuttle; City of Poughkeepsie route
M	Poughkeepsie			Eastside Shuttle; City of Poughkeepsie route
P	Poughkeepsie			Westside Shuttle; City of Poughkeepsie route

=== RailLink shuttles ===
These routes operate weekday rush hours only, to and from their namesake Metro-North station.

Route name	Terminal	Streets traveled
Poughkeepsie RailLink	Poughkeepsie Town; Route 55 Park-and-Ride Lot at Page Industrial Park	East-West Arterial; Freedom Plains Road
New Hamburg RailLink	Wappinger; Old Hopewell Road and Route 9	Route 9D; Myers Corner Road; All Angels Hill Road; Old Hopewell Road

== Fleet ==
=== Active roster ===
Fleet number(s)	Year	Manufacturer	Model
100-103	2010	OBI	Orion VII NG (07.501)
104-105	2010	OBI	Orion VII NG HEV (07.501)
400-404	2014	ElDorado National	Axess BRT 35'
405-409	2015	ElDorado National	Axess BRT 35'
500-509	2016	ElDorado National	EZ Rider II BRT 30'
600-612	2014-2015	IC Bus	AC Series
900-905	2010	Ford/Starcraft	E-450/Allstar
906-907	2010	Chevrolet/ARBOC	Spirit of Mobility

=== Retired roster ===
This roster is incomplete.

Fleet number(s)	Year	Manufacturer	Model
108	1983	MCI	MC-9
201-206	1998	Gillig	Phantom 35'
207-211	2000	OBI	Orion V (05.501)
301-315	2004	Chevrolet/Coach and Equipment	C5500/Condor CMD-55
401-402, 407	2000	Blue Bird	CSFE
413-414, 419–420	2000	Blue Bird	CSFE
748		GMC	RTS-01
800-814	2010	Thomas	Saf-T-Liner EF
