= Matthew Lee (sociologist) =

American sociologist, criminologist, and university administrator

Matt Lee
- Born: Matthew Raleigh Lee
- Education: Dutchess Community College; State University of New York at New Paltz; Louisiana State University
- Awards: Member of Sigma Xi since 2009
- Scientific career
- Fields: Sociology, Criminology
- Workplaces: Louisiana State University; Mississippi State University
- Thesis: Hyperdeprivation and race-specific homicide, 1980-1990 (1999)
- Doctoral advisor: Edward Shihadeh

Matt Lee is an American social scientist and university administrator at Louisiana State University (LSU). He is currently the Senior Vice Chancellor for Agriculture and Dean of the College of Agriculture. He holds the Chalkley Family Endowed Chair in Agricultural Leadership.

Trained as a criminologist, Lee received the National Science Foundation Early CAREER award and has published widely in the fields of criminology, public health and rural studies. Since 2010 he has held a variety of leadership roles, including senior associate vice president for research, vice provost for academic programs, interim executive vice president and provost, and interim president of the LSU System.

== Education and career ==
Lee received his A.A. degree from Dutchess Community College in 1992, his B.A. from the State University of New York at New Paltz in 1994, and his M.A. and Ph.D. degrees from Louisiana State University in 1996 and 1999, respectively. He attended the Institute for Management and Leadership in Education at Harvard University in 2012.

=== Professor ===
In 1999, he joined the faculty of Mississippi State University as an assistant professor of sociology, and was promoted to associate professor in 2003. In 2004, he left Mississippi State to become an associate professor of sociology at LSU with tenure. In 2008, he became a full professor at LSU.

=== University administrator ===
Lee served as the Associate Vice President for Research at LSU from 2010 to 2015.

From July 2015 to June 2021 he served as the Vice Provost for Academic Programs and Support Services at LSU.

He served as the Interim Executive Vice President & Provost, the chief academic and chief operating officer for the institution, from July 2021 to August 2022.

In August of 2022, he began his post as the interim Vice President for Agriculture and Dean of the College of Agriculture, supporting the agricultural enterprise which encompasses a statewide extension network. This position became permanent in April 2023.

From June to November of 2025, he served as interim President of LSU.
