= Graham Ousey =

American sociologist

- Born: Graham Christopher Ousey
- Education: B.S., Radford University; M.A., College of William & Mary; Ph.D., Louisiana State University
- Awards: 2010 Faculty Award for the Advancement of Scholarship from Phi Beta Kappa society at the College of William & Mary
- Scientific career
- Fields: Sociology, criminology
- Institutions: College of William & Mary
- Thesis: The link between economic restructuring, economic deprivation, and serious crime in American cities, 1970-1990 (1997)
- Doctoral advisor: Edward Shihadeh

Graham C. Ousey is an American sociologist and criminologist. He is a professor of sociology at the College of William & Mary, where he is also the chair of the sociology department. He is known for researching immigration and crime.
