= Edward Shihadeh =

American sociologist

Edward S. Shihadeh
- Education: University of Alberta (A.B. 1985, 1988); Pennsylvania State University (Ph.D., 1992)
- Awards: Delivered Distinguished Demographer Lecture at 2013 Warren Kalbach Population Conference (held by Society of Edmonton Demographers)
- Scientific career
- Fields: Sociology criminology
- Institutions: Louisiana State University
- Thesis: Race, Family Structure and Crime in the U.S., 1960-1990: Alternative Explanations of Race-Disaggregated Crime Rates (1992)
- Doctoral advisors: Clifford Clogg; Darrell Steffensmeier
- Doctoral students: Matthew Lee; Graham Ousey

Edward S. Shihadeh is an American sociologist and criminologist. He is professor and chair of sociology at Louisiana State University (LSU) in Baton Rouge, Louisiana. At LSU, he also coordinates the Crime and Policy Evaluation Research Group, which he co-founded with Matthew Lee in 2005. He began his academic career in mathematical demography, but later became interested in researching crime and deviance as they pertained to urban black communities. He leads a team of researchers at LSU that analyze data from the Baton Rouge Area Violence Elimination (BRAVE), an anti-crime initiative based on Operation Ceasefire.
