= Van Wyck Homestead Museum =

Historic house in New York, United States

- U.S. National Register of Historic Places
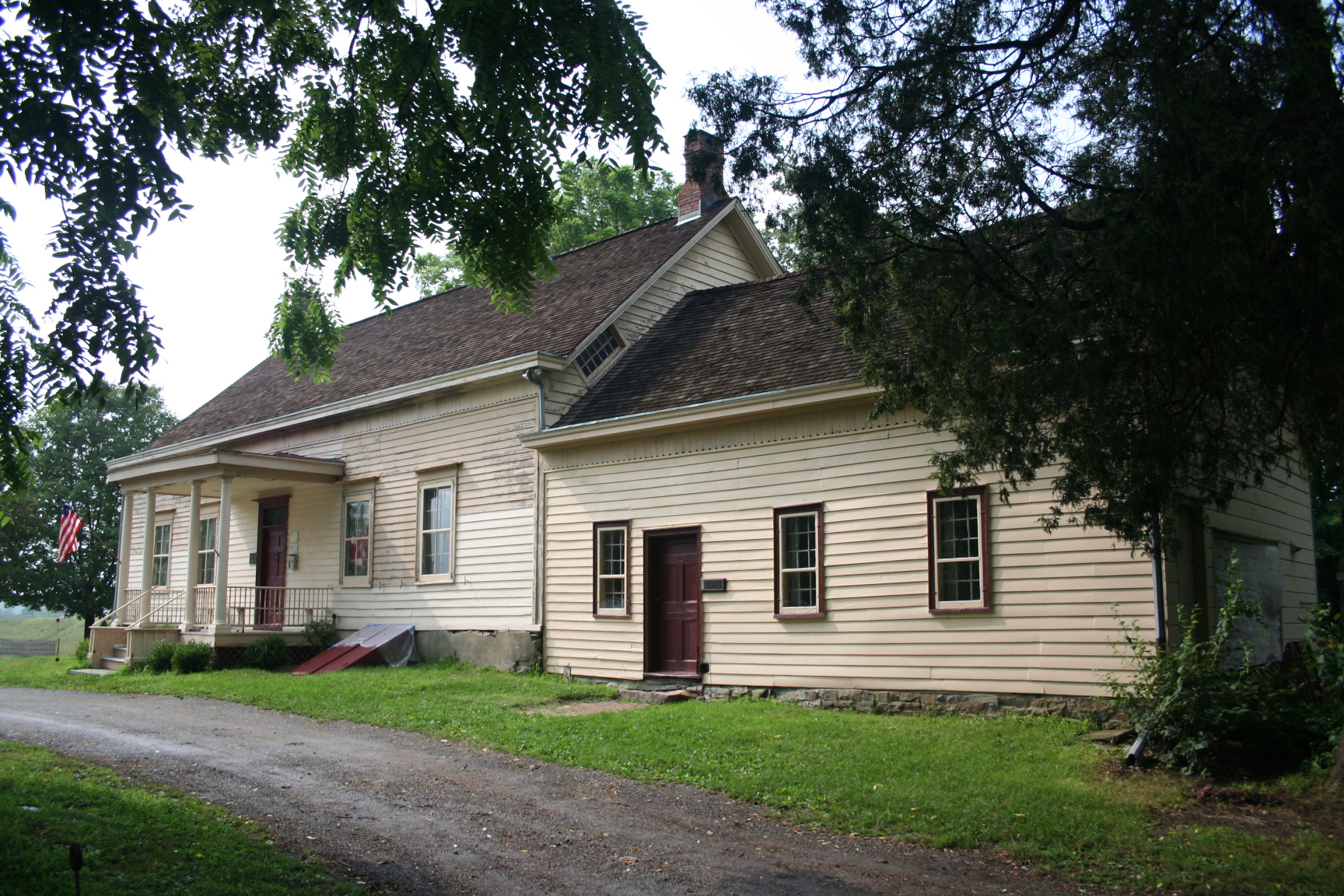
- Van Wyck Homestead Museum
- Location: Fishkill, New York, United States
- Nearest city: Beacon, New York, United States
- Coordinates: 41°31′22″N 73°53′20″W
- Area: 70 acres (28 ha)
- Built: 1732
- NRHP reference No.: 72000828
- Added to NRHP: 1972

- Fishkill Supply Depot Site
- U.S. National Register of Historic Places
- Nearest city: Fishkill, New York
- Area: 70 acres (28 ha)
- Built: 1777
- NRHP reference No.: 74001230
- Added to NRHP: 1974

The Van Wyck Homestead Museum or Van Wyck-Wharton House (pronounced Van Wike) is an early 18th-century Dutch colonial house in the Town of Fishkill, New York, United States. It served as a headquarters to a major military supply depot during the American Revolutionary War and has been listed on the National Register of Historic Places since April 13, 1972; the adjoining Fishkill Supply Depot Site has been listed on the NRHP since January 21, 1974. It is located on US 9 just south of Interstate 84. Excavations during the construction of a nearby gas station and the Dutchess Mall in the early 1970s unearthed many artifacts at the site, particularly materiel.

== Background ==
The Van Wycks were an aristocratic family originally from Holland who were a prominent part of Dutchess County history. Members of the Van Wyck family served in the Revolutionary and Civil Wars, and also held both local and national political positions.

In 1732, Cornelius Van Wyck (1694–1761), a surveyor, built a house with three rooms on 959 acres (approximately 3.88 km^{2}) of land he had purchased from Catheryna Rombout Brett, the daughter of Francis Rombouts, who was one of the grantees of the original patent to the land in the area issues by King James II of England. Later (before the year 1757) the house was extended and the original structure became the east wing of the enlarged house. Since then, the building has remained a Dutch colonial construction featuring a characteristic central hall with two identical doors.

== Revolutionary War and afterward ==
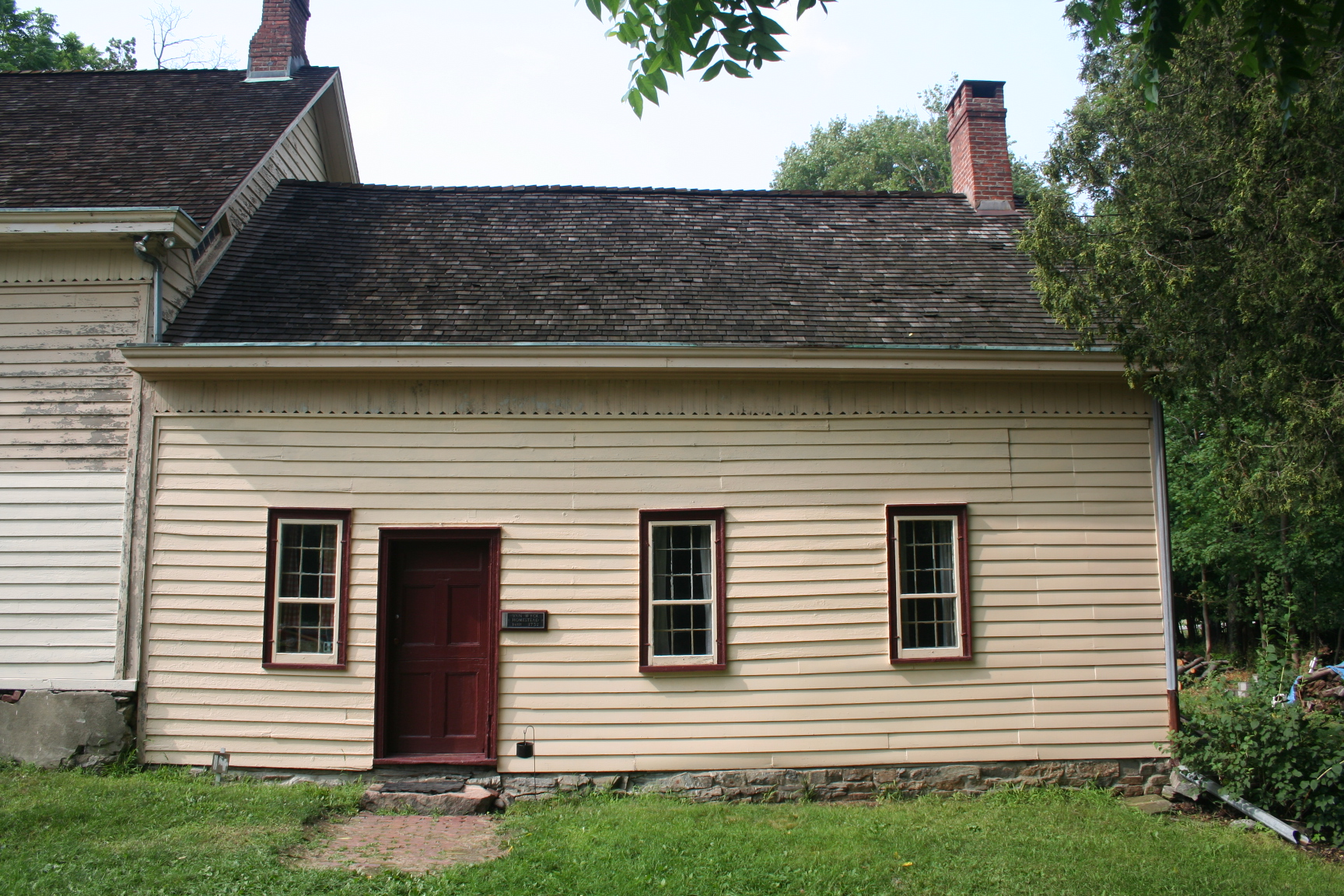
East wing of the house

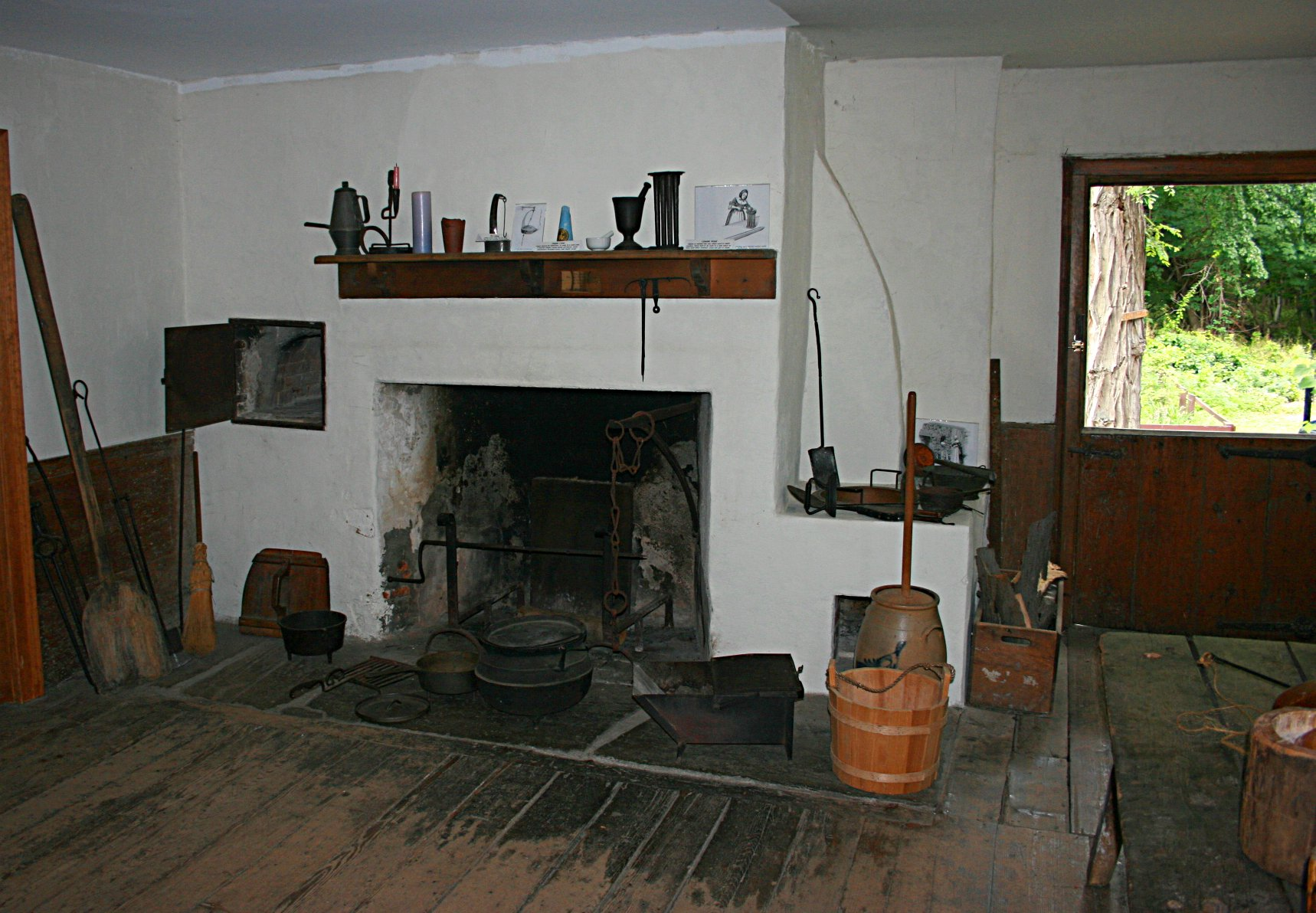
Inside the house

During the American Revolutionary War, the property was the home of Isaac Van Wyck. However, because of its strategic location with regard to the Hudson River and major roads, the Old Albany Post Road (later US 9) running north–south and the road running east–west (later NY 52 and Interstate 84), it was requisitioned by the Continental Army. The building became the headquarters of the Fishkill Supply Depot, which was created on the orders of George Washington in 1775. The Fishkill Supply Depot was the major logistical center for the Revolutionary War in the north. The depot was a military camp and storage yard which became the main provider of artillery and food for about 4,000 troops stationed in the area to prevent the British forces from passing New York City and capturing the Hudson Valley (the latter a major strategic goal of the British at the beginning of the American Revolutionary War). 70 acres (28 ha) of land surrounding the house were used for a large encampment of over 2,000 soldiers and many facilities such as an artillery park for repairing cannons, a blacksmith shop, barracks, a storehouse, and stables were set up.

Thousands of Continental troops, militia, and their families lived at the Depot complex until April 1783. Its position in the Hudson River Valley prevented enemy advances. The depot complex consisted of barracks for thousands of soldiers, officer housing, hospital, magazine, prison, parade grounds, blacksmith shops, stables and store houses. Established by General George Washington and serving at varying times as a headquarters and nexus point for General Israel Putnam, General Alexander McDougall, General Horatio Gates, Alexander Hamilton and General Lafayette, it played an essential role in the Continental Army's victory over British forces. The Depot provided logistic operations for all of George Washington's operations in the Hudson Valley during the war. According to retired Army colonel James Johnson, a 1969 graduate of the U.S. Military Academy and a former West Point military history professor, the food, clothing and armaments the depot provided to Washington's soldiers helped them keep the redcoats from gaining control of the strategic Hudson Highlands.

It served as headquarters to General Israel Putnam and was visited by revolutionary leaders such as George Washington, the Marquis de Lafayette, Friedrich Wilhelm von Steuben, Alexander McDougall, Alexander Hamilton, and John Jay. Inside the house, courts-martial were held in the home's parlor. Although under British surveillance, the Depot was never attacked, hundreds died there of wounds, hypothermia, dysentery, and smallpox. Periods of starvation were also endured by troops during the Depot's seven years of service. It is the largest burial ground of American Revolutionary War soldiers identified in the United States.

A walnut tree, which stood in front of the house until 1898 when it was toppled by a storm, served as a whipping tree for punishing soldiers. An iron claw which was attached to the tree for this purpose was recovered from the tree and is now on display in the house. The mock trial of Enoch Crosby, who had infiltrated a loyalist group and is considered as the first secret agent of the United States, was held in the building. The house is therefore the likely setting for James Fenimore Cooper's novel, "The Spy" which is based on Enoch Crosby's story. The Van Wyck house also served as the Quartermaster Department in charge of clothing the troops. In addition to its military functions, it also housed the printing press for the newspaper "New York Packet", which was relocated to the Van Wyck homestead from British-occupied New York City. Besides the newspaper, orders for the Army were also printed and the newspaper's publisher, Samuel Loudon, was appointed Postmaster for the State of New York with Fishkill becoming the first official New York State Post Office.

After the Revolutionary War, the house was given back to the Van Wyck family and remained the family's home until the suicide of Sidney Van Wyck in 1882. Following the death of Sidney Van Wyck, two more families, the Hustis and the Snook families, owned the property. For a time, a tea room was operated in the house and was frequented by Eleanor Roosevelt when she was on her way to her estate in Hyde Park, New York.

== Recent years ==
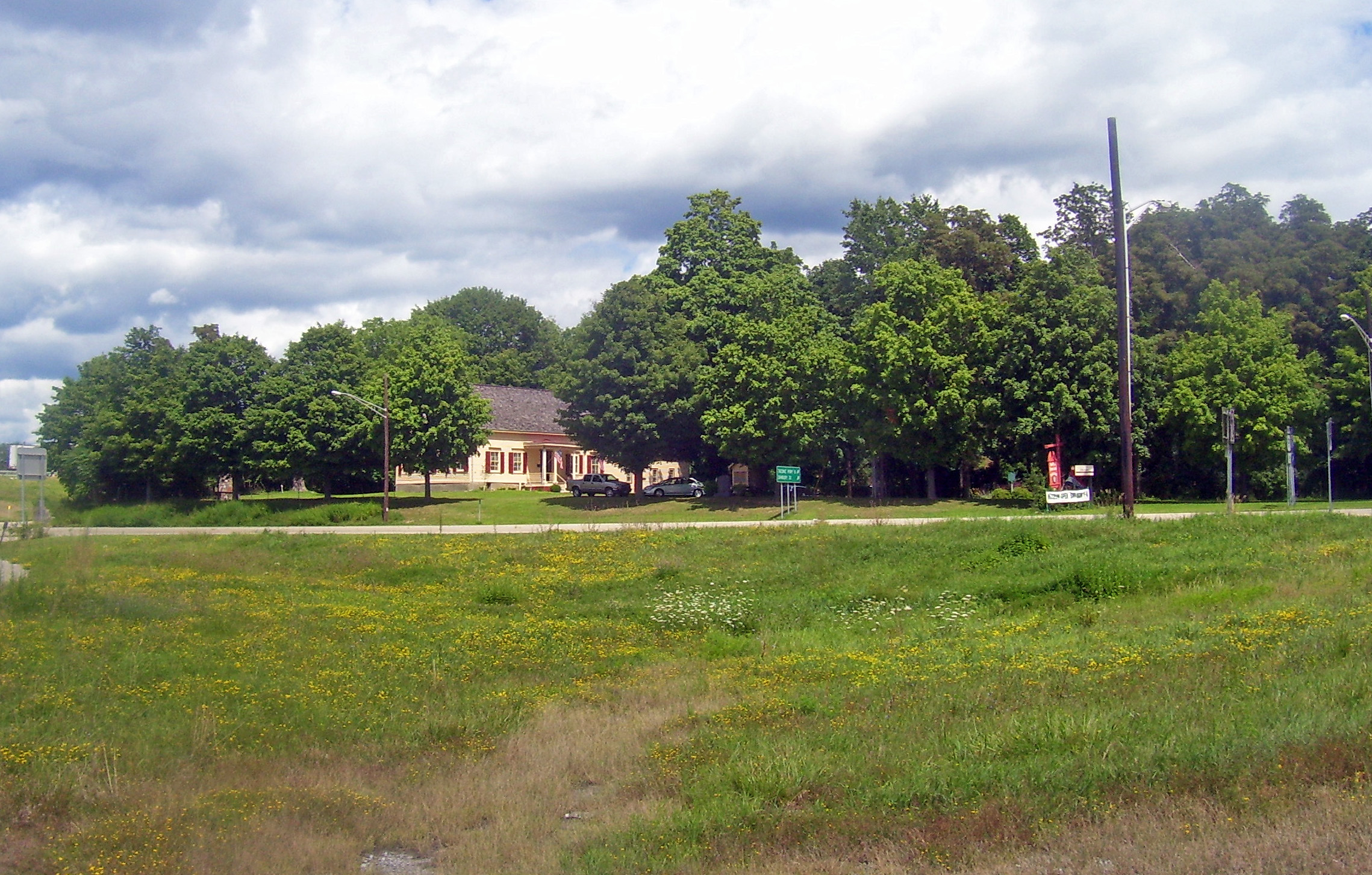
Archeological site from I-84 offramp to the west

With the construction of I-84 and its exit ramps in the immediate vicinity of the homestead, the Snook family donated the house and 1 acre (4,000 m^{2}) to the Fishkill Historical Society, which was founded in 1962 to preserve the house from demolition and has since continued to restore and to operate it as a museum. However, much of the Depot site was developed in the 1970s, causing the loss of many artifacts from the period.

The Van Wyck Homestead is the last remaining structure of the supply depot, which now contains a vast Continental Army Burial Complex. The 70 acres (28 ha) to the east and west of the homestead, including the exit ramps from I-84, were added to the National Register of Historic Places as the Fishkill Depot Supply Site on January 21, 1974. In 2007, a team of archaeologists using ground penetrating radar discovered hundreds of graves at the southern end of the property. Friends of the Fishkill Supply Depot and United States Senator Charles Schumer are leading a project to save the site under the Battlefield Protection Act and to create a National Park on the site.

In 2016 developer Domenic Broccoli proposed taking eight acres of land to develop Continental Commons, an "18th century colonial village,". Lance Ashworth, president of Friends of the Fishkill Supply Depot, asserted that this development would "destroy an authentic historical site for the sake of building a cheap replica." He noted that Broccoli told the town planning board he wants to include an International House of Pancakes location as part of the complex. A spokesperson for Broccoli responded that the IHOP would not be located on actual burial grounds. IHOP said that no plans for a restaurant at that location has been approved.

=== Archeological site ===
Most of the area of the Fishkill Supply Depot was developed for the Dutchess Mall, which opened in 1974.

For that reason, the same year the mall opened the National Park Service, which oversees the National Register, separately added the 70 acres (280,000 m^{2}) south of I-84 and bisected by Route 9 to the Register as the Fishkill Supply Depot Site. Much of that land, particularly on the east of the home, remains undeveloped and unexcavated, awaiting future investigation.

== See also ==
- List of Registered Historic Places in Dutchess County, New York
- Intelligence operations in the American Revolutionary War
- Washington's Headquarters State Historic Site
- Friedrich Wilhelm von Steuben's Headquarters
