= Hudson Valley Credit Union =

Credit union in the state of New York

- Type: Credit union
- Industry: Financial services
- Founded: IBM Poughkeepsie Employees Federal Credit Union, Poughkeepsie, New York, (1963)
- Headquarters: Poughkeepsie, New York, United States
- Key people: Jonathan Roberts, President & CEO
- Total assets: $8 Billion USD
- Number of employees: 1,100+ As of December 2025
- Website: hvcu.org

Hudson Valley Credit Union (Hudson Valley Federal Credit Union) is a member-owned financial cooperative headquartered in Poughkeepsie, New York. Founded in 1963, HVCU is one of the largest credit unions in New York with 40 locations, and is among the largest in the United States by assets.

As of December 2025, the credit union reported more than 388,000 members, over 1,100 employees, and more than $8 billion in total assets.

The credit union returns earnings to members through competitive rates and community investment while providing retail and business financial services – including checking and savings accounts, loans, mortgages, digital banking, wealth management, and insurance services.

== Membership ==
The credit union has been helping members, employees, and communities reach their financial goals for more than 60 years. Individuals and businesses can establish membership through one of three associations to take advantage of HVCU’s lineup of financial products and services – which includes Wealth Management and Insurance Services:

- HVCU Charitable Foundation
- American Consumer Council (ACC)
- Community Impact Fund (CIF)

== Locations ==
Hudson Valley Credit Union serves members across an extensive branch network in New York, with 40 branch locations across 13 counties – spanning Albany County in the Capital Region to Westchester County in the Hudson Valley area.

- Albany County
- Columbia County
- Dutchess County
- Greene County
- Orange County
- Putnam County
- Rensselaer County
- Rockland County
- Saratoga County
- Schenectady County
- Sullivan County
- Ulster County
- Westchester County

== Community Giving ==
Established in 2024, the certified 501(c)(3) HVCU Charitable Foundation supports nonprofit organizations across 13 counties that offer programs to improve community access to education, food, health, and housing for all.

Nonprofit 501(c)(3) organizations can submit applications on the credit union website to apply for financial support if their work supports education, food security, health, or housing in HVCU communities.

In addition, HVCU actively engages in corporate and event sponsorships that align with its Purpose and Impact while driving business opportunities. These include Business Development, Community Activation, and Legislative sponsorships opportunities so HVCU can engage with the community, support local initiatives, and foster positive relationships that benefit everyone involved.

== History ==
=== Early Years (1963–1993) ===
Hudson Valley Credit Union was founded in October 1963 as IBM Poughkeepsie Employees Federal Credit Union, established by a group of IBM employees in Poughkeepsie and Fishkill, New York. The credit union was chartered by the National Credit Union Administration (NCUA) and initially served IBM employees and their families.

In 1981, the credit union opened its first off-site branch, which included its first ATM and drive-up services. Membership eligibility expanded in 1983 to include all IBM employees, retirees, and family members throughout Dutchess County.

=== Expansion and Community Charter (1994–2018) ===
In 1990, the organization changed its name to IBM Hudson Valley Employees Federal Credit Union, reflecting its broader geographic footprint. In 1994, membership was expanded beyond IBM employees to include other employers in the region, prompting a name change to Hudson Valley Federal Credit Union (HVFCU).

A major milestone occurred in 2003, when HVFCU transitioned to a community charter, allowing individuals who lived, worked, worshiped, volunteered, or attended school in the Hudson Valley counties of Dutchess, Orange, and Ulster to become members. This change significantly broadened the credit union’s reach and membership base.

In 2010, Putnam Federal Credit Union merged into HVFCU, adding branch locations in Carmel and Brewster, New York. At this time, the community charter expanded to include Putnam County.

=== Charter Changes and Rebranding (2019–2023) ===
On September 4, 2019, the credit union converted from a federal charter to a New York State charter, expanding its field of membership from four to 12 counties. As part of this transition, the organization dropped “Federal” from its name and became Hudson Valley Credit Union on October 4, 2019. Member deposits continued to be insured by the NCUA through the National Credit Union Share Insurance Fund (NCUSIF).

=== Recent Developments (2024–present) ===
In September 2024, Hudson Valley Credit Union expanded further through the acquisition of eight Berkshire Bank branch locations, extending service into the Capital Region and Columbia County.

In addition, the credit union announced a merger agreement with Catskill Hudson Bank in early 2024, which added 11 branches to the credit unions footprint by March 2025 – deepening the credit union’s presence with the addition of locations in Sullivan County and expanded services in the Capital Region.

In October 2025, HVCU announced its approval to return to a federal charter, with the transition taking effect on January 1, 2026. This expanded membership access beyond New York, allowing individuals and businesses to establish membership through one of three associations to take advantage of HVCU’s strong lineup of financial products and services:

- HVCU Charitable Foundation
- American Consumer Council (ACC)
- Community Impact Fund (CIF)

As of March 2025, HVCU has 40 locations spanning 13 counties in New York State, including its student-powered branch at Marist University, Marist Red Fox Financial. This partnership provides students with hands-on experience in financial management, marketing, human resources, and operations, while offering workshops, events, and seminars hosted by HVCU – who oversees the branch’s banking operations. The Marist Red Fox Financial club on campus assists in managing the locations day-to-day activities.

== Leadership ==
Jonathan Roberts serves as President and Chief Executive Officer, having joined the credit union in September 2022. He succeeded Mary Madden, who led the organization from 2002 until her retirement in 2022.

== Recognition ==
In 2025, HVCU’s President & Chief Executive Officer Jonathan Roberts was nominated as part of the prestigious 2025 Luminaries Award cohort in the Executive Leadership category for cooperatives $4 billion and up in assets. In addition, the Dutchess County Regional Chamber of Commerce recognized Chief Experience Officer Desiree Wolfe as a 2025 ATHENA Award recipient, which celebrates individuals in the Hudson Valley who exemplify the values of collaboration, courage, advocacy, and excellence.

The Albany Business Review also recognized Hudson Valley Credit Union with the 2024 Newsmaker of the Year award for the organization’s rapid expansion into the Capital Region.

Prior to this, Hudson Valley Credit Union was named to GoBankingRates best credit unions in 2022 and 2023, in addition to being recognized for its workplace culture and employee benefits as a notable employer in 2015 by regional publications.

Hudson Valley Federal Credit Union, Insured by the NCUA. Equal Housing Lender.
