= J.W. Mays =

Real estate firm based in Brooklyn, New York, United States

J.W. Mays, Inc.

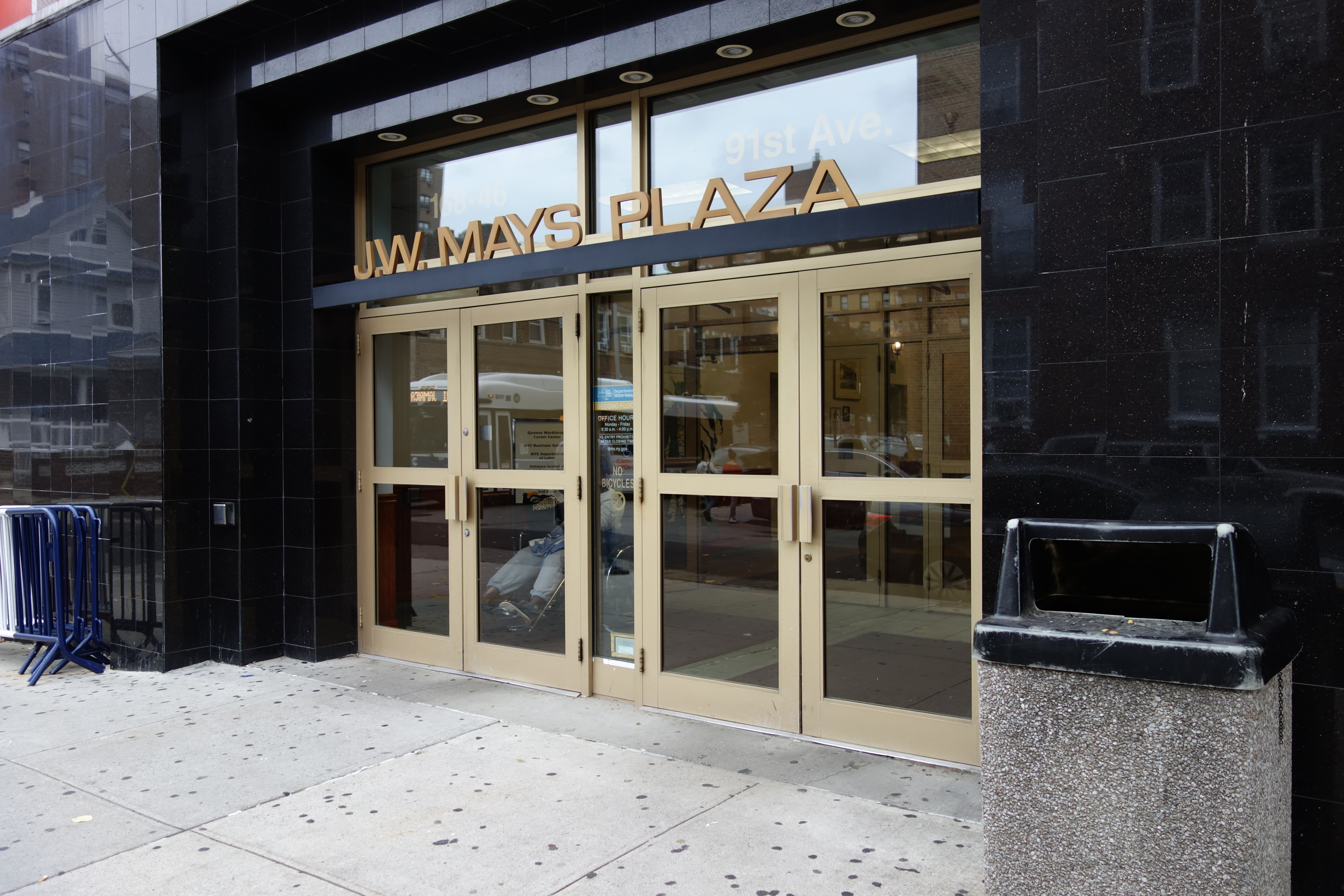
- The former J.W. Mays store at Jamaica Avenue and 169th Street in Jamaica, Queens.
- Type: Public
- Traded as: Nasdaq: MAYS
- Founded: 1927; 99 years ago

J.W. Mays, Inc. is a real estate firm based in Brooklyn, New York, United States. From 1927 until 1988 the company ran a chain of discount department stores in the area surrounding New York City referred to as Mays, with stores located in three of New York City's five boroughs, Long Island, and Putnam County. At its height as a retailer, the firm had 5000 employees working in 9 stores during the early 1970s.

== History ==
The chain grew from a Brooklyn women's clothing store founded by Joe Weinstein, a Polish Jewish immigrant from Galicia, in 1924. In 1929, Weinstein incorporated the company and added his initials. The first location opened its doors at 510 Fulton Street in Brooklyn in September 1929. The reason why he chose the name to begin with was because, as Weinstein said, "it reminded me of the countryside and the flowers and the springtime".

Mays grew throughout the 1950s and 1960s. Its slogan, "Every day's a sale day at Mays!", was imprinted, in big red, script lettering, on every white paper shopping bag, and every white cardboard shopping box. Mondays were "super-sales" days, and stores were especially crowded then. Weinstein was aggressive in his competition against other discount retailers such as Ohrbach's and Alexander's, as well as the higher—end department stores. At one point, Weinstein discussed a merger between Mays and his two main discount competitors, but it never came to be. At the company's peak in the 1970s, Mays operated nine stores. At that time, the company had about 5,000 employees. By the late 1970s, it started losing market share to other discount retailers, and in 1982 the store declared Chapter 11 bankruptcy. The company closed five locations that operated outside the city, leaving one store in Manhattan, two stores in Queens, and the original store in Brooklyn.

In 1987, Mays closed one of its two stores in Glen Oaks, Queens, leaving three in the chain. The chain continued on but announced on December 28, 1988 that they would be closing the remaining three stores in the chain immediately, with the final sale occurring on December 31 of that year. Beginning on January 1, 1989, J.W. Mays, Inc. reincorporated as the real estate company that currently does business, using the real estate that its stores had previously occupied.
