= Luckey, Platt & Company Department Store =

Historic commercial building in New York, United States

- U.S. National Register of Historic Places
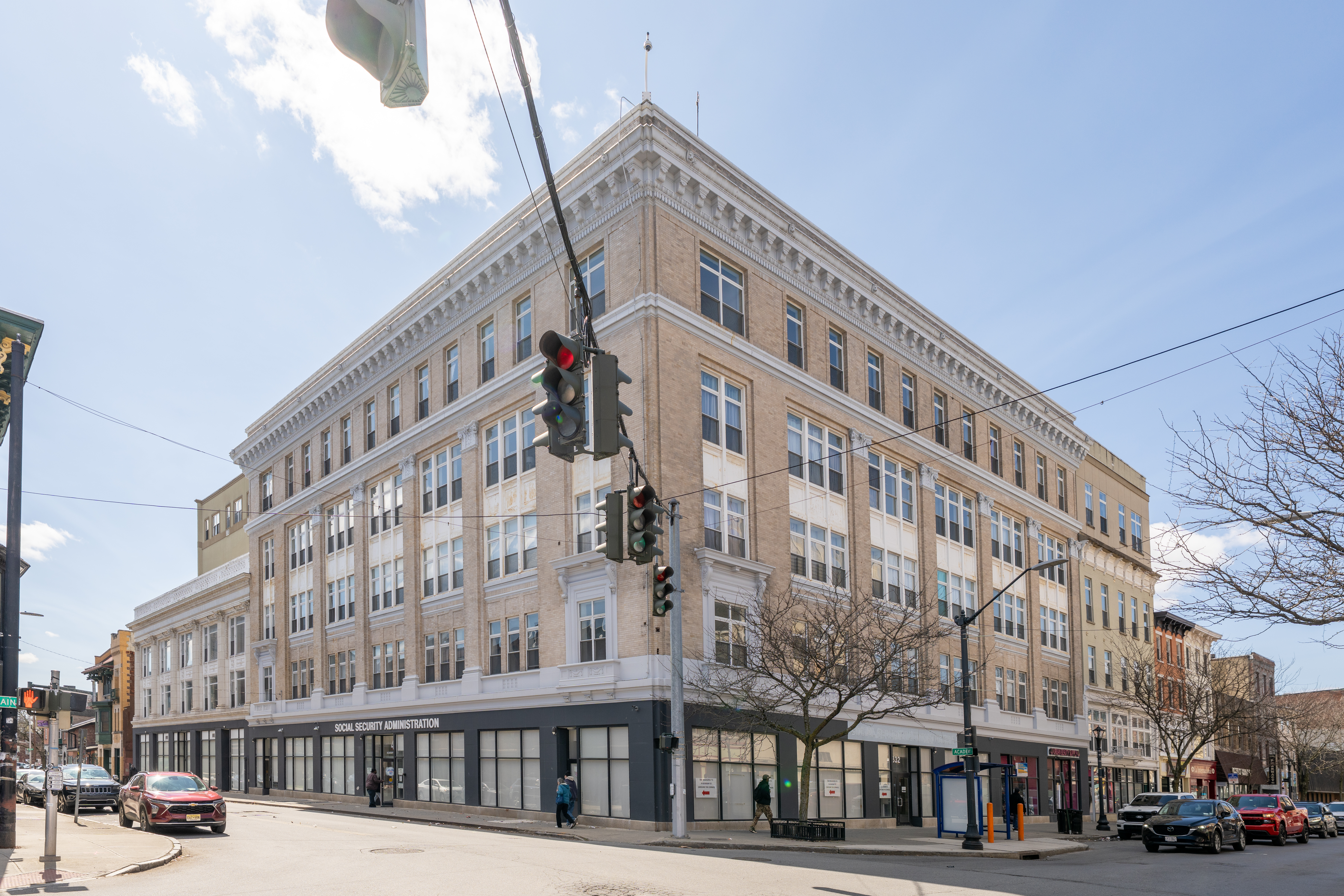
- (2026)
- Location: Poughkeepsie, NY
- Coordinates: 41°42′10″N 73°55′33″W
- Built: 1923
- Architect: Edward C. Smith
- Architectural style: Classical Revival
- NRHP reference No.: 82001146
- Added to NRHP: 1982

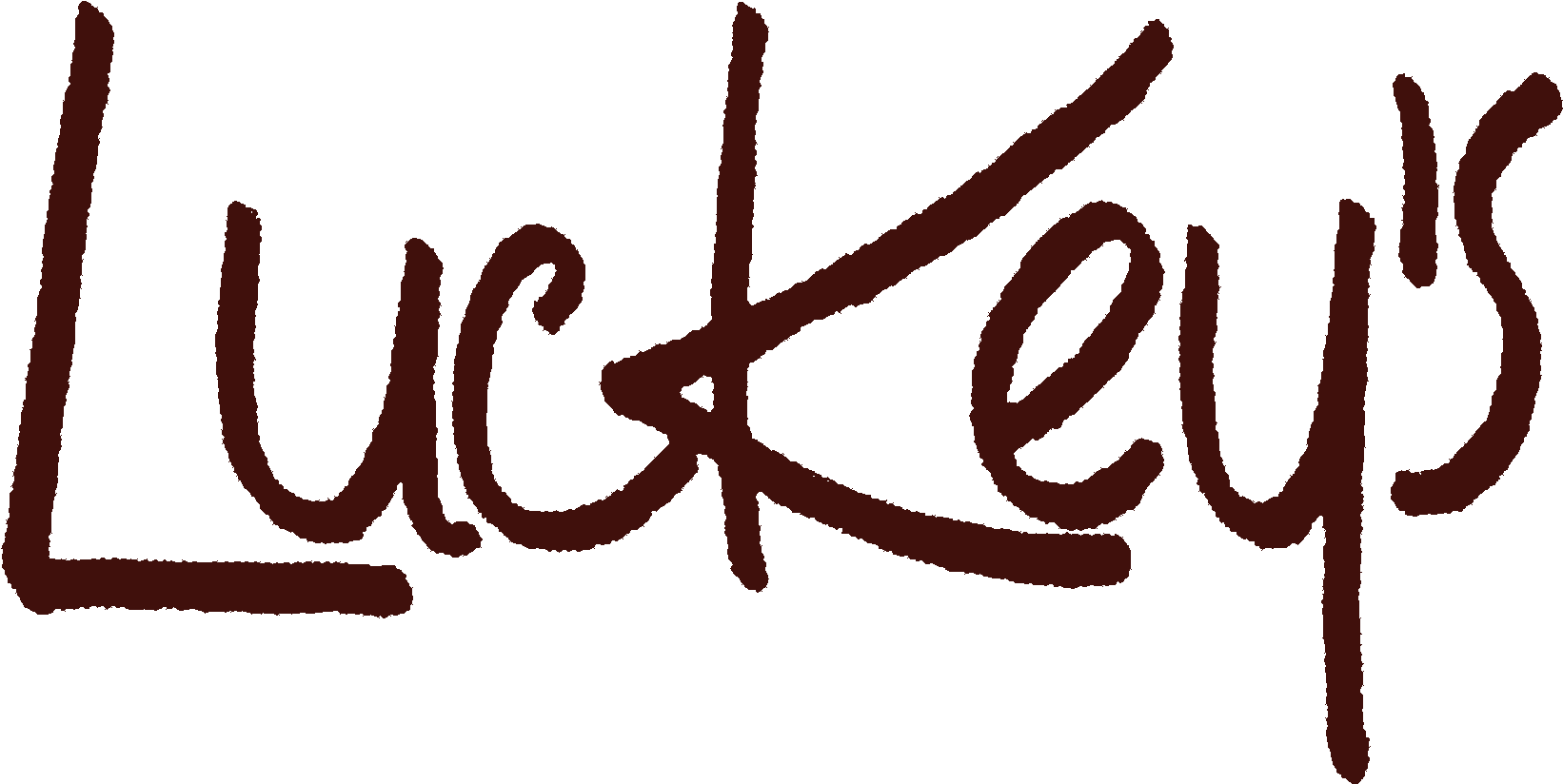
Luckey's final logo

The Luckey, Platt & Company Department Store building is located at the corner of Main and Academy streets in downtown Poughkeepsie, New York, United States. For most of the 20th century it was a major retail destination not only for the city but the entire Hudson Valley. Its closure in 1981, after years of losing customers to suburban shopping malls, was a serious blow to the city's Main Mall. The structure remained vacant until December 2008, when after several years of renovation it was reopened as a residential development with 143 rental apartments, with additional commercial space on the ground floor, as an anchor and catalyst for further downtown revitalization.

== Building ==
The massive, gray, five-story Classical Revival structure was designed by Edward C. Smith a leading Poughkeepsie architect at the time and opened in 1923. Previous articles have given a fellow Poughkeepsie architect, Percival Lloyd, credit for the design but he died in 1915. Edward Smith had worked for Percival Lloyd at one time but opened his own office in 1910. There are from 11-17 bays. The roofline features a parapet roof with a molded cornice below featuring small lion's heads. The frieze has other features of the style, such as anthemion brackets, egg-and-dart and dentil moldings. Further down the facade are found pilasters with foliated capitals.

Immediately adjacent on either street are older, more Italianate buildings which housed the store's operations before the construction of the main building. They are included as contributing resources to its 1982 listing in the National Register of Historic Places.

== Company history ==
The company long predated the building, and even its name. In 1869, Edmund Platt bought Luckey's, a retailer that had been established in 1835 as Crandle & Smith, and later renamed Dribble's before getting its eventual name. Luckey's was ahead of its time in charging a fixed price for every item in the store, and doing business only in cash.

The partners moved it to the first of the three original Main Street buildings five years later, beginning a half-century of rapid growth at that location, with the help of a third partner, Smith DeGarmo. In 1882 they added an elevator so patrons could more easily navigate the store.

By 1901 it was necessary to expand again and two more buildings were purchased. Nine years later an annex was built to sell furniture. The store considered itself "the peer of all mercantile establishments on the Hudson River and the most complete store of its kind in any city in the U.S. the size of Poughkeepsie." Their advertisements claimed to have the equivalent of 30 stores under one roof, 175 sales clerks and 2 miles (3.2 km) of counter space.

The new building was completed in 1923. For almost half a century afterwards, the store remained the region's major retailer, although it did not grow as it had in its earlier years. By the early 1970s, however, increasing suburbanization and the growth of the automobile had given it its first serious competition, in the form of the South Hills Mall. Luckey Platt opened a branch at one, the Dutchess Mall, roughly 10 miles south of Poughkeepsie near Fishkill, but it still lost customers.

In the early 1970s, the city tried to revive its downtown by closing off the two blocks of Main Street both east and west of the store to create Main Mall, a pedestrian mall that would offer shoppers a comparable experience to the suburban malls. Since it was necessary to raze some other adjacent stores and buildings to create parking lots, the plan actually exacerbated the neighborhood's decline. Seven years after the mall was created, in 1981, Luckey Platt closed both its main store and the Dutchess Mall branch.

The building has remained vacant since then. Ownership eventually reverted to the city. In the early 1990s, Dutchess County needed space to expand its nearby courthouse and considered using the building. Instead, it built a new annex next to the existing courthouse. Artist Peter Max looked into starting a museum and arts center in the building in the early 2000s. But the deal fell through, and three of the building's upper floors collapsed the following year. In 2004 Congress appropriated the city a $250,000 (~$396,737 in 2024) grant to renovate the building.

In 2006 Alma Realty, a Queens-based developer, purchased the property from the city for a token $1 and began an ambitious plan to convert it to mixed commercial/residential use. It was beset with delays, however, such as a stop-work order when the actual work exceeded the scope of plans approved by the city. However, in April 2008 the stop-work order was rescinded and work resumed to finish the renovation, with a temporary certificate of occupancy issued on Monday, December 8, 2008, allowing Alma Realty to start renting the space.
