= Dutchess Community College =

Public college in Poughkeepsie, New York, U.S.

- Other name: DCC
- Type: Public community college
- Established: 1957; 69 years ago
- Parent institution: State University of New York
- President: Peter Grant Jordan
- Academic staff: 107 FT/271 PT (2024)
- Undergraduates: 6,994 (fall 2025)
- Location: Poughkeepsie Town, New York, U.S. 41.724901°N 73.904257°W
- Campus: Suburban, 130 acres (53 ha)
- Colors: Blue & buff
- Nickname: Falcons
- Sporting affiliations: National Junior College Athletic Association, Region III, Mid-Hudson Athletic Conference
- Mascot: Falco
- Website: www.sunydutchess.edu

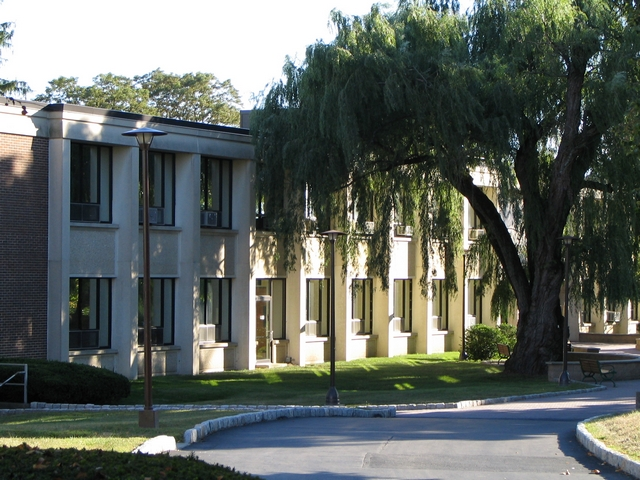
Taconic Hall

Dutchess Community College (SUNY Dutchess, or DCC) is a public community college in Dutchess County, New York. It is one of 30 community colleges within the State University of New York system (SUNY).

The main campus, in the town of Poughkeepsie, covers 130 acres (53 ha). DCC also operates the Center for Excellence in Industry and Innovation in Fishkill, approximately 12 miles (19 km) south, in Fishkill and an aviation education center at the Hudson Valley Regional Airport in the town of Wappinger.

Over 60 academic programs are offered, the majority of which are geared toward associate degrees or certificates. In addition, the Office of Workforce Development and Continuing Education provides non-credit courses, High School Equivalency completion through preparation for the GED exam, ESL classes, and workforce training to residents of Dutchess County and beyond.

One-third of all Dutchess County college-bound high school graduates attend Dutchess Community College each year. The majority of alumni live and work in the Hudson Valley, and many have become civic and community leaders.

== History ==
In 1957, the college was founded on the site of a former tuberculosis hospital, which is now Bowne Hall, the campus's main administrative building. In 2007, Dutchess Community College marked its 50th anniversary of operations. Since enrolling its first class in 1957, DCC has awarded degrees and certificates to over 30,000 graduates and has provided educational opportunities for many thousands of other students.

On 25 August 2012, Conklin Hall was opened, becoming the college's first, and as of 2023, only on-campus residence hall. At 132,000 square feet (12,300 m^{2}; 1.23 ha), it can house up to 467 students in 98 suites.

=== Presidents ===
Since its founding in 1957, there have been six people who have served as President of Dutchess Community College. In addition, there has been one acting president. James F. Hall of Michigan was hired as the first president of the college in 1957. Pamela Edington, when appointed in 2014, became the first woman to hold the position. Her successor, Peter Jordan, became the first person of color to serve as president of DCC in August 2021.

The presidents of the college are:

- James Hall (1957–1972)
- John Connolly (1972–1982)
- Jerry A. Lee (1982–1992)
- D. David Conklin (1992–2014)
- Pamela R. Edington (2014–2020)
- Ellen Gambino (2020–2021) acting
- Peter G. Jordan (2021–present)

== Academics ==
=== Academic departments ===
The academic offerings of Dutchess Community College are organized into nine main departments:

- Allied Health and Biological Sciences
- Behavioral Sciences
- Business, Aviation and Construction Professions
- English and Humanities
- History, Government, and Economics
- Mathematics and Computer Sciences
- Nursing
- Performing, Visual Arts and Communications
- Physical Sciences, Engineering and Technology

=== Academic support services ===
Dutchess Community College has a variety of academic support services available to its student body. These services range from tutoring to programs geared towards helping minority students succeed, and include:

- The Math & Science Center
- The Writing Center
- Office of Accommodative Services (offering disability support)
- Educational Opportunity Program (EOP)
- The Collegiate Science and Technology Entry Program (CSTEP)

=== The Bridge Program ===
In an effort to more effectively prepare students for college, as well as to draw more students to the college, DCC instituted early admission for local high school students. This allows the students to take certain DCC classes on the campus, primarily entry-level English classes, but also government to calculus courses, depending on the proficiency of the student. While the majority of local high schools allow their students to travel to DCC for these classes, a few do not, such as Poughkeepsie High School.

DCC also has a program called College Connection with many local high schools where students take classes at their high schools taught by teachers who are also approved by DCC. The classes count for college credit.

=== The Charles E. & Mabel E. Conklin Scholarship for Academic Excellence ===
Established in 2003, the Charles & Mabel Conklin Scholarship provides students with the full cost of tuition for four semesters at DCC. The scholarship is open to graduating seniors attending a high school in Dutchess County that graduate in the top 10% of their class. 43 students were awarded the Charles E. & Mabel E. Conklin Scholarship in 2016.

== Campuses ==
=== Main campus in Poughkeepsie ===
Nearly all of DCC's eleven main campus buildings are situated on top of a large hill. Conklin Hall, the Louis Greenspan Day Care Center, and Falcon Hall are the only three buildings not to be situated on top of the hill.

- The Allyn J. Washington Center for Science & Art, which also contains the campus' only art gallery
- Bowne Hall, which holds all the central administrative offices on the campus
- Conklin Hall, the only on-campus residence hall, which also contains a secondary dining hall for the exclusive use of Conklin Hall residents
- Center for Business & Industry, commonly referred to as CBI
- Drumlin Hall, the main dining hall on campus
- Dutchess Hall, which contains the only theater, the campus bookstore, as well as multiple student lounges
- Falcon Hall, housing the campus gymnasium as well as a fitness center
- Hudson Hall houses the only library on campus, as well as the campus Writing Center
- Louis Greenspan Day Care Center
- Orcutt Student Services Center
- Taconic Hall

=== Fishkill branch ===
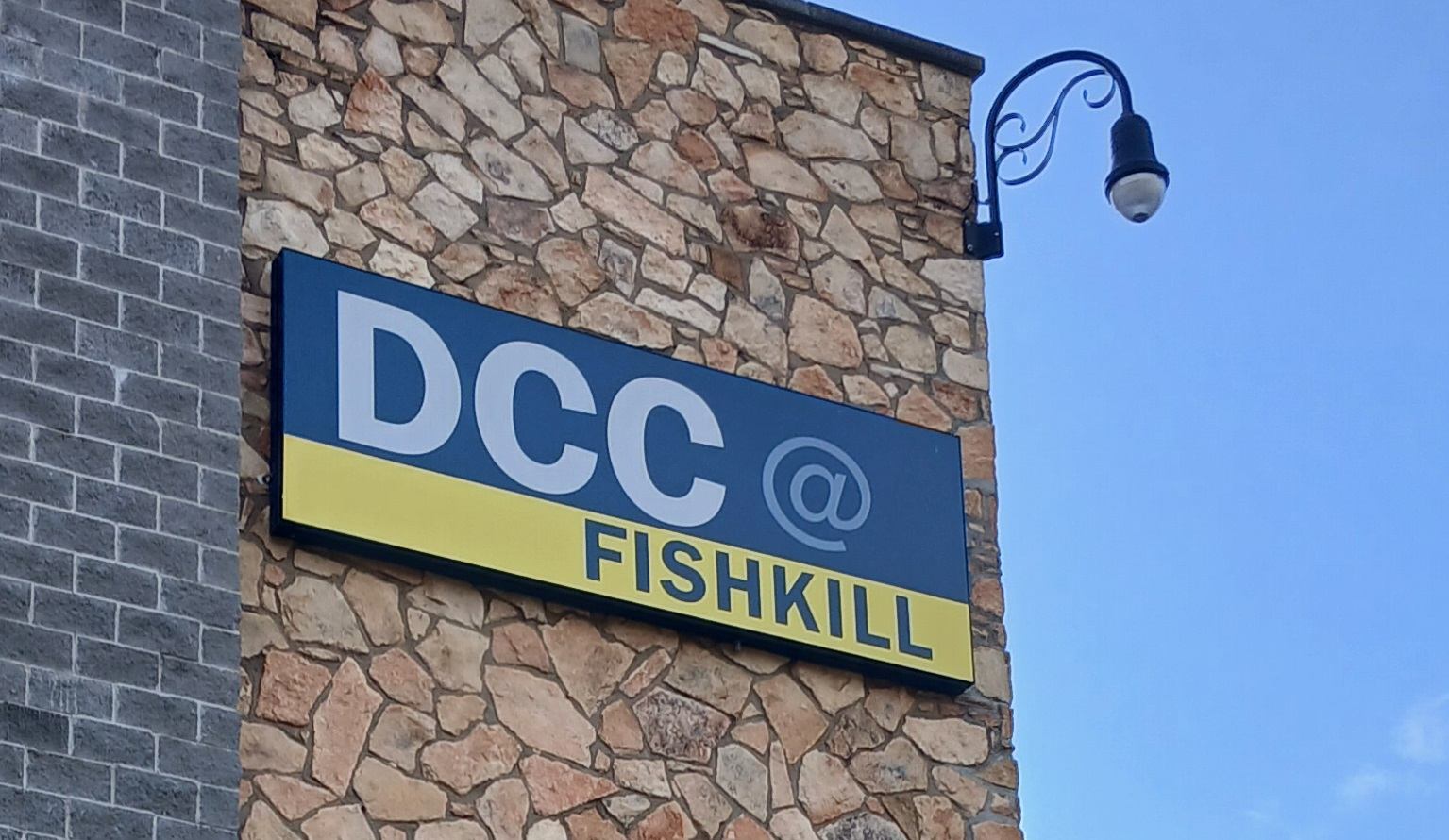
DCC at Fishkill logo

In Fall 2021, Dutchess Community College opened a new satellite center called DCC@Fishkill, approximately 12 miles (19 km) south of the main campus, at the site of the former Dutchess Mall's Jamesway anchor store. The Fishkill facility has 20 multi-purpose classrooms, a versatile design, a fully equipped biology lab, and a networked computer classroom.

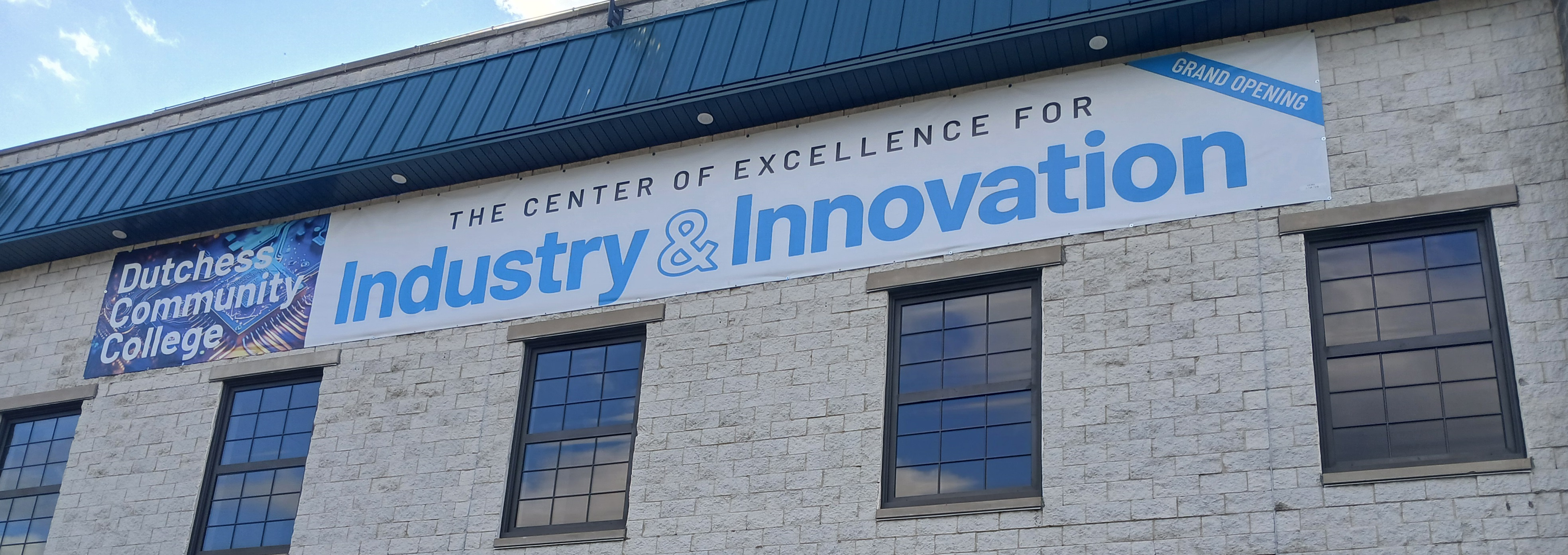
Banner for the Center of Excellence for Industry & Innovation

Located in the Fishkill campus is the Center of Excellence for Industry and Innovation, a mechatronics lab, with three rooms set up as a Mechanical lab, an Electrical/Automation lab and a Heating, Ventilation, and Air Conditioning lab. The college offers hands-on learning needed to support installation, maintenance, repair, calibration and troubleshooting of systems including controls and machine-to-machine networks.

On October 6, 2023, First Lady of the United States Jill Biden toured the DCC@Fishkill facility, particularly the newly opened Mechatronics lab.

Previously, Dutchess Community College had a satellite branch in Wappingers Falls, called Dutchess South, which operated from at least the early 1990s until 2021. It closed upon the opening of the Fishkill location.

=== Aviation Education Center ===
In 2019, DCC broke ground on the Aviation Education Center at the Hudson Valley Regional Airport in the Town of Wappinger. It officially opened in June 2021 and includes classroom space for training and education in the field of aviation. The facility is home to a Grumman G3-C20 jet.

== Student life ==
Dutchess Community College has a variety of departments and programs dedicated to engaging students and promoting success, all of which are operated by the Department of Student Services. The Department of Student Services has, under its operating umbrella, offices including Health Services, Student Activities, Intercollegiate Athletics, Admissions, and Counseling Services, including many others. Health Services operate the on-campus health center and offers minor medical treatment to DCC students free of charge. The Office of Intercollegiate Activities is responsible for operating and maintaining all sports teams on campus. Sports available for men include soccer, basketball, and baseball. Women's sports include volleyball, softball, basketball, and starting in the fall of 2017, soccer. The Office of Student Activities manages student trips, guest speaker lectures, family festivals, on-campus events, the Student Government Association (SGA) and all on-campus clubs.

== Notable people ==
=== Alumni ===
- Bill Duke, actor and director
- Mela Hudson, actress
- Kima Jones, writer and poet
- Matthew Lee (1992), Vice President for Agriculture & Dean, College of Agriculture, Louisiana State University
- Marc Molinaro (2001), member of the US House of Representatives (2023–2025) and Administrator of the Federal Transit Administration (2025–2026)

=== Former faculty ===
- Matt Finley, (1982–2002), retired professor of computer information systems and former dean of academic affairs
- Donald L. Klein, (1987), chemistry professor
- Rita Kogler Carver, (2005–2008), lighting designer
- Sumi Tonooka, (1998–2006), piano instructor

=== Former staff ===
- George Tarantini, (1977–1980), assistant soccer coach
