= The Shoppes at South Hills =

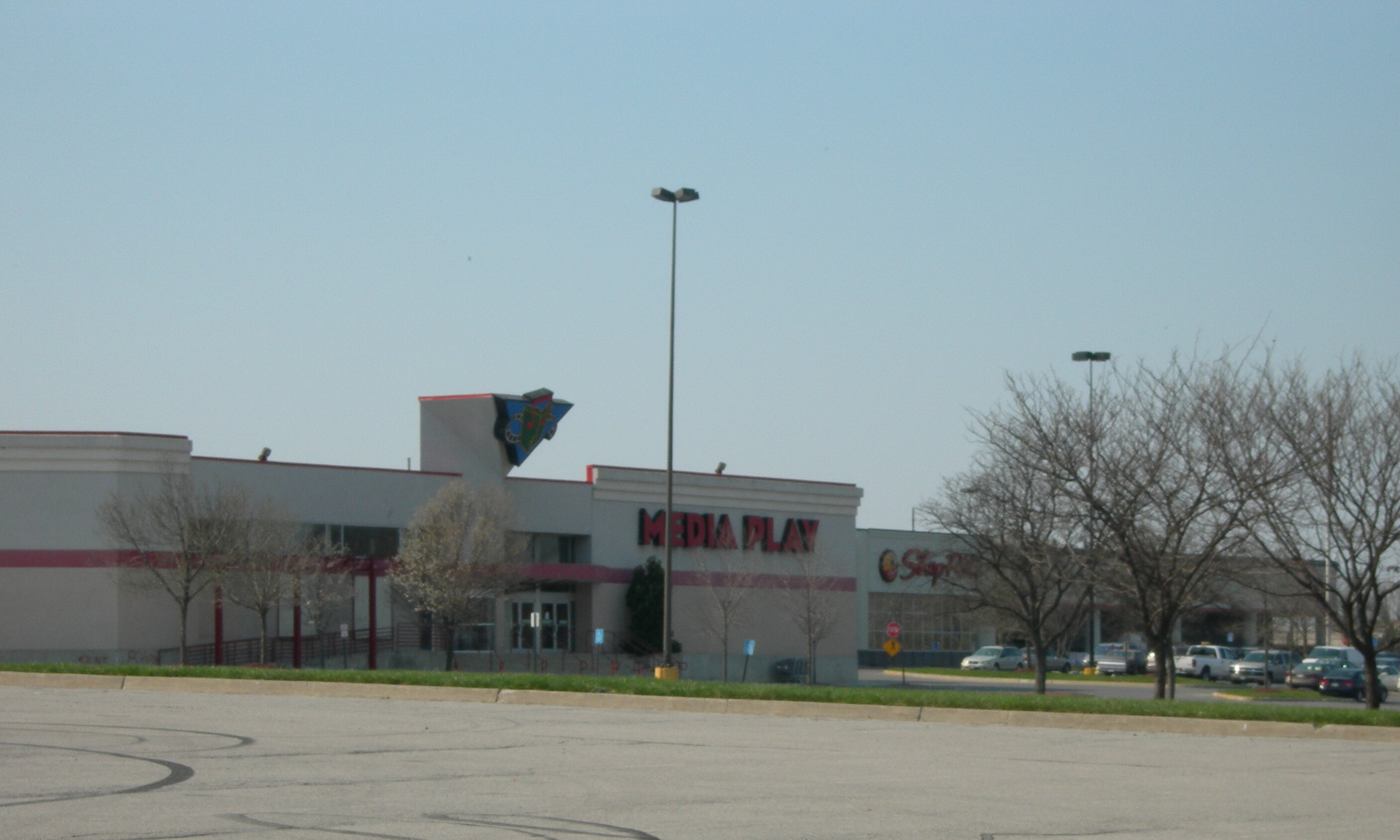
- Media Play and ShopRite stores
- Location: Poughkeepsie, New York, United States
- Coordinates: 41.617251°N 73.920326°W
- Opened: August 5, 1974
- Closed: December 31, 2007 (Indoor Mall) Still in Operation (Strip Mall)
- Manager: DLC Management Corporation
- Owner: DLC Management Corporation
- Num. of stores: 11
- Num. of anchor tenants: 3
- Floor area: 75,000 sq ft (7,000 m^{2})
- Floors: 1
- Parking: 2000+ spaces
- Website: Official website

The Shoppes at South Hills, formerly the South Hills Mall, was a shopping mall on U.S. 9, now converted into a strip mall, in the town of Poughkeepsie, New York. The 675,000 ft² plaza opened in 1974 and included two anchors, Sears and Kmart, at opposite ends of the mall. Currently, The Shoppes at South Hills are owned and operated by DLC Management Corporation.

The mall is adjacent to its more successful rival, the Poughkeepsie Galleria, and the two properties are linked by a series of roads between the two properties. These roads pass directly in front of a Lowe's, situated on land between the Shoppes and the Galleria. The Galleria's existence led to the slow decline and eventual closure of South Hills Mall.

Following the closing of the indoor mall, the mall was partially demolished except for the anchor stores, rebuilt, rebranded, and reopened in 2008 as an outdoor strip mall.

== History ==
=== South Hills Mall ===
South Hills Mall was the first indoor shopping mall in Poughkeepsie and the second in Dutchess County, after the Dutchess Mall in Fishkill, 10 miles to the south. It was constructed at a cost of $110 million. Upon opening, anchors were Sears and Kmart, in addition to dozens of smaller shops and stores, including Record World, Walden Books, NY Piano and Organ, Spencer Gifts, and Endicott Johnson Shoes. The original plan called for Forbes & Wallace as the other anchor. South Hills quickly became the dominant retail center in the Poughkeepsie area, leading to the closing of prominent downtown retailer Luckey Platt & Co. in 1981.

In 1985, an expansion in the center of the mall added a food court, which featured a Burger King, a sandwich shop, and a pizza place, as well as a Hess's department store.

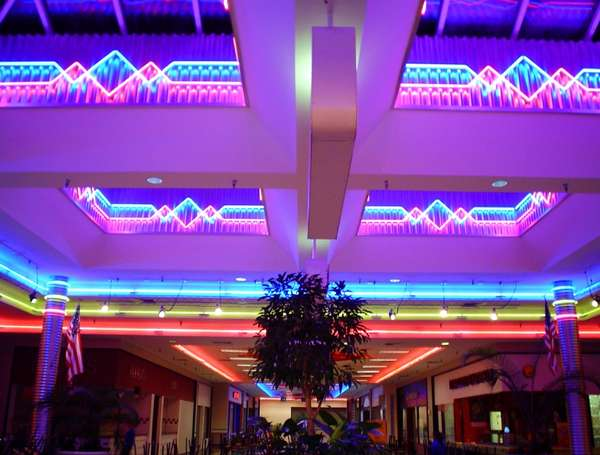
The "Technodome", which used to be located above the food court

In the early 1980s, a proposal for a two-story mall adjacent to South Hills was submitted. This proposal became the Poughkeepsie Galleria and opened in 1987. Though the malls co-existed successfully for the first several years of the Galleria's existence, as the 1990s began South Hills began to suffer. In 1991, Hess's closed their location at the South Hills Malls and Sears moved to the Galleria. The Hess's space was replaced by Burlington Coat Factory, while the Sears space was divided between Pharmhouse and a freestanding Price Chopper supermarket. Service Merchandise relocated to the mall in 1995 after closing their location at the Dutchess Mall. The company ultimately went out of business in 2002.

In the 1990s, South Hills was sold to Sarakreek Holdings NV, a Dutch property holding firm which attempted to revive the mall by opening "big-box" retailers like Media Play, Old Navy, Office Max, Discovery Zone, and Bob's Stores. The success was short-lived. By the late 1990s, Sarakreek sold South Hills to the Dagar Group, a locally based retail ownership group.

The mall's decline accelerated after this change as many smaller tenants left the mall. Filling those holes have been smaller, independent shops which existed for only a brief time. The Service Merchandise location has been largely vacant, minus several months as an overstock book store. After Phar-Mor, parent of Pharmhouse, folded, the space was filled by two different furniture stores. The closings of Media Play, OfficeMax, and Price Chopper supermarket in 2006 did not bode well for the mall. The Price Chopper location was subsequently replaced by a ShopRite supermarket and has remained successful.

All other smaller stores in the mall had closed by December 31, 2007. Despite all other stores being closed, the interior halls of the South Hills Mall remained open.

For a period of time from January through May 2008, the only remaining stores were the major anchor stores: Kmart, Silver Cinemas, Burlington Coat Factory, and ShopRite.

=== The Shoppes at South Hills ===
In July 2008, construction crews began demolition of the site, while four of the five remaining tenants remained open. Kmart remained at the south end of the mall, Burlington in the middle and ShopRite at the north end. Kmart retained a section of the South Hills Mall interior walkway, as a way to allow customers who parked behind the property to reach the store. The Namco Pools relocated down the road to a new space on Route 9.

The space, newly rebranded as the Shoppes and South Hills strip mall, finished construction in 2009, with Christmas Tree Shops and New England–based Bob's Discount Furniture both opening their doors the same year. Pet Goods and Oklahoma-based arts and crafts store Hobby Lobby opened in 2012.

In 2014, the furniture and home goods retailer Ashley Furniture opened a location at the mall.

Fitness chain Orangetheory Fitness and frozen yogurt retailer Peachwave both opened locations on the property in 2015.

On April 14, 2016, Sears Holdings, the parents company of both Kmart and Sears, announced it was closing 10 Sears stores and 68 Kmart stores, including the one at The Shoppes at South Hills. Following a months-long liquidation sale of all merchandise and assets the store had, the Kmart officially closed on July 31, 2016.

As of 2026, current tenants include, Hobby Lobby, Ashley Furniture, Bob's Discount Furniture, Shop Rite and a pickleball facility.

=== Movie theater ===
Although there were plans for a six screen movie theater, the space was originally occupied by Park Place Roller Rink from 1981 to 1983. An eight-screen movie theater opened in the space on December 7, 1984, originally known as South Hills Cinema 8. It was later taken over by Hoyts. During the 2000s, it was known as Silver Cinemas. On February 25, 2014 Silver Cinemas closed. By 2015, it had reopened under new management, rebranded as Empire Cinemas. In February 2019, Empire Cinemas also closed.

=== History of management ===
- Unknown (January 1974 – February 1990)
- Sarakreek Holdings NV (March 1990 – late 1990s)
- Dagar Group (late 1990s – October 2005)
- Vornado Realty Trust (November 2005 – December 2014)
- DLC Management Corporation (since January 2015)
