= Poughkeepsie Galleria =

Shopping center in New York, United States

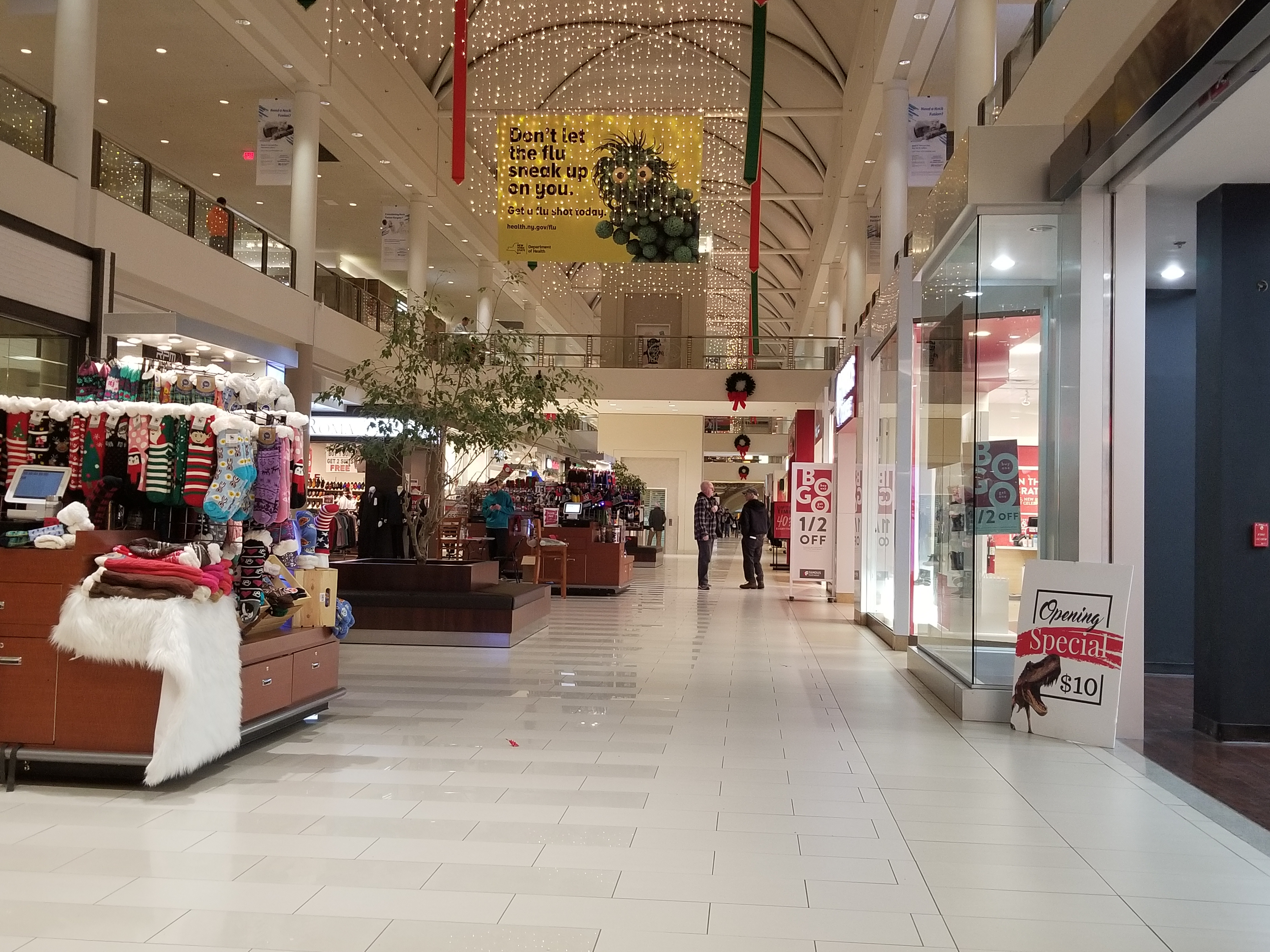
- The Poughkeepsie Galleria in December 2019
- Location: Poughkeepsie, New York, United States
- Coordinates: 41.626241°N 73.920653°W
- Opened: August 4, 1987
- Developer: The Pyramid Cos.
- Manager: Pyramid Management Group
- Owner: Pyramid Management Group
- Num. of stores: 105
- Num. of anchor tenants: 4
- Floor area: 1,100,000 square feet (100,000 m^{2})
- Floors: 2
- Parking: 2000 spaces
- Website: poughkeepsiegalleriamall.com

The Poughkeepsie Galleria is a shopping center on U.S. Route 9 in the town of Poughkeepsie, New York, just north of Wappingers Falls, and is the largest shopping center in Dutchess County. The Galleria has an area of 1,100,000-square-foot (100,000 m^{2}) with two floors containing 123 shops and restaurants as well as a 16-screen, stadium-seating Regal Cinemas theater.

The Poughkeepsie Galleria is owned and managed by The Pyramid Companies, a group which also owns and manages the Palisades Center in West Nyack, New York.

== History ==
In the early 1980s, a proposal for a two-story indoor mall in Poughkeepsie, New York was submitted. The mall opened to the public on August 4, 1987 as the Poughkeepsie Galleria Mall.

Upon opening, the mall had five anchor stores: G. Fox & Co., Jordan Marsh, Lechmere, Filene's, and JCPenney. Due to underperformance, the Filene's store closed in 1989 and was replaced with Steinbach, which relocated from South Hills Mall next door. Sears also announced plans to relocate from South Hills Plaza at the same time. Steinbach closed in 1995 and became Dick's Sporting Goods and DSW Shoe Warehouse the same year. Filene's returned to the mall in 1993 by taking over the defunct G. Fox chain, while Sears ultimately opened at the mall after Jordan Marsh was vacated. Montgomery Ward also moved into the mall in the early 1990s, becoming the sixth anchor and replacing an existing store in Poughkeepsie. A Lowe's Home Improvement store opened in the southwest surrounding area in January 1999.

In 2004, both DSW and Dick's moved to new locations vacated by Montgomery Ward, while the former Filene's and Lechmere building was converted to Best Buy and Target.

During January 2005, the mall announced it would enact and begin enforcing the Pyramid Companies' "MB-18" teenage curfew policy beginning in September 2005, following a large fight involving young teenagers in front of what was then Filene's. Due to the size of the incident, local police were called, and several arrests were made. Filene's was converted to Macy's in 2006.

On February 8, 2020, It was announced Sears would shutter as part of an ongoing decision to eliminate their traditional brick-and-mortar format.

On June 23, 2020, JCPenney announced that they would also close their location at the Poughkeepsie Galleria. In 2021, the vacant store was used as a COVID-19 vaccine distribution site.

In October 2022, the Poughkeepsie Galleria has announced newest additions: 110 Grill, The Village Pancake Factory, and Windsor.

In 2024, Bounce Sports & Entertainment Center opened a sports and entertainment center on the second floor of the former JCPenney. The company that had owned the space, Bounce, had outgrown their previous location which was only 30,000 square feet (2787.1 m²) and had moved to the mall which allowed them to expand to 85,000 square feet (7896.8 m²).
