= Storm–Adriance–Brinckerhoff House =

Historic house in New York, United States

- U.S. National Register of Historic Places
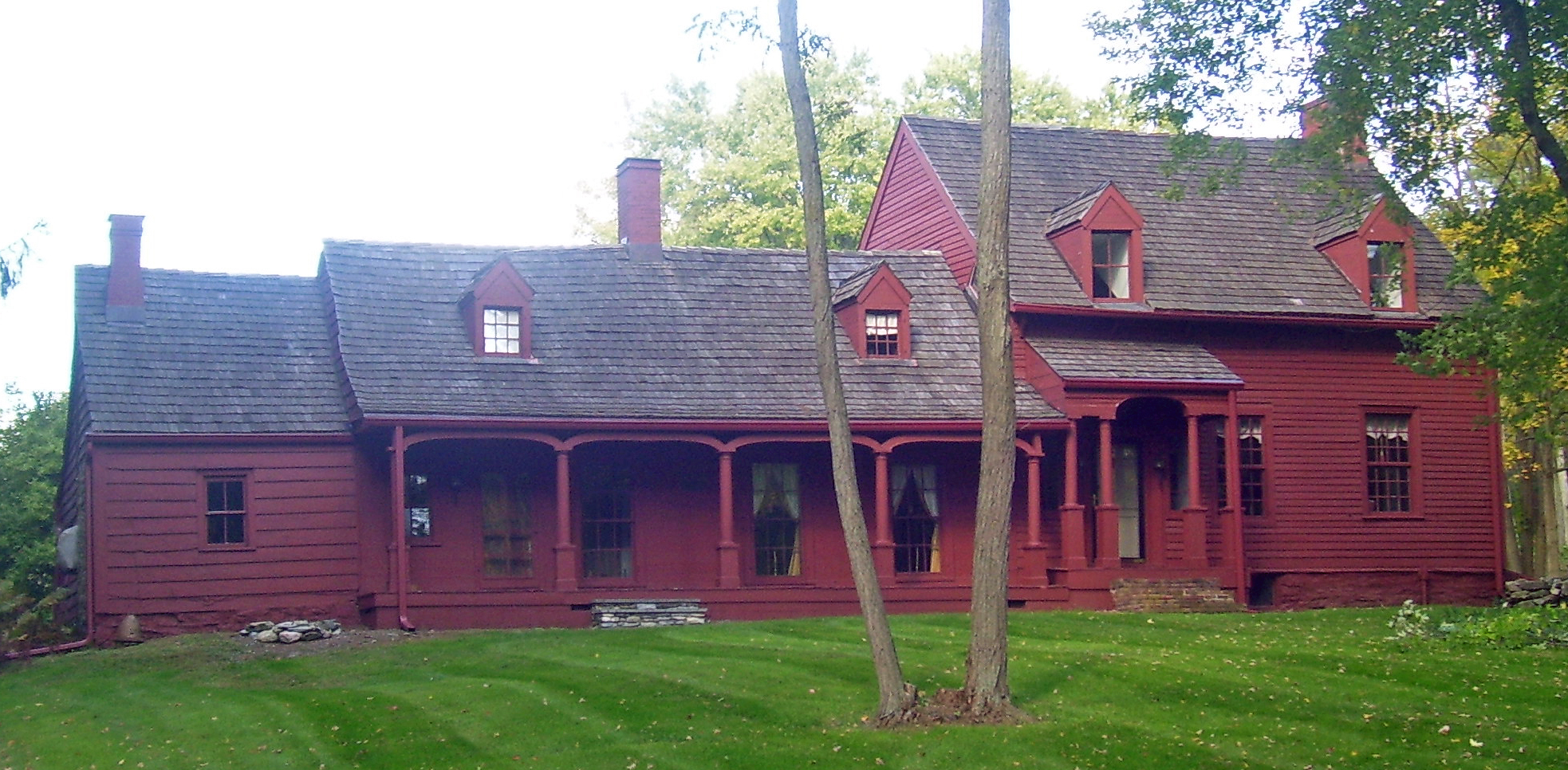
- South elevation, 2008
- Location: East Fishkill, NY
- Nearest city: Poughkeepsie
- Coordinates: 41°35′47″N 73°45′40″W
- Area: 5.4 acres (2.2 ha)
- Built: 1759
- Architectural style: Dutch Colonial
- NRHP reference No.: 08000581
- Added to NRHP: July 3, 2008

The Storm–Adriance–Brinckerhoff House is located on Beekman Road (Dutchess County Route 9) in East Fishkill, New York, United States. It is a wooden building in three parts, the oldest of which dates to the mid-18th century.

Some of its inhabitants have been among the prominent residents of the county, and the state. Thomas Storm, a captain in the Continental Army during the Revolutionary War, later served as the state Assembly Speaker. He had George Washington as a guest one night. Members of the Brinckerhoff family, longtime inhabitants of the area, lived in the house until 1930.

The house is considered an excellent, well-preserved example of Dutch Colonial architecture. Its modifications and additions reflect changing tastes over the time it was within the Storm family. In 2008 it, along with several other structures on the property, was listed on the National Register of Historic Places. It has been described as "the most historically significant house" in East Fishkill because of the Washington connection.

== House and grounds ==
The house is on a 5.4-acre (2.2 ha) parcel on the north side of Beekman Road on the northeast corner of the Sylvan Lake Road junction just east of its interchange with the Taconic State Parkway, also listed on the National Register. The area is generally wooded with low-density farm and residential development. The lot is level with the house set back 200 feet (61 m) from the road. A small pond is located in the rear.

The main building itself is a heavy timber frame structure sided in clapboard on a stone foundation. The walls are filled with wattle and daub. Three chimneys pierce the gabled roof, covered with asphalt shingles. It is divided into an east (two stories) and west (one and a half stories) section, itself with a kitchen wing on the west.

A porch on the main block of the east section, supported by wooden columns gives access to the original Dutch door offset to the west. It opens into a remaining section of the original great room. It retains its original wide floor planks, exposed chestnut ceiling beams and window sashes. Rear doors lead into a modern kitchen and mud room added to the rear. To the east the cooking shed has the original fieldstone fireplace with exposed chimney and beehive oven.

The Portaal to the east has a Federal style fireplace and mantel with fluted columns. To its north is a built-in shelf and closet. Original wallpaper remains on the south wall. The upper half-story is given over to bedrooms, one of which has the original flooring and a secret compartment in the floor.

Three dormer windows pierce the south (front) side of the roof on the east wing. A small shed-roofed portico with shallow rounded arch supported by four wooden columns gives access to its original Dutch door, with sidelights. It opens onto a central hall with original staircase. On its east are a living room and library, both with original detailing. The library's chimney breast has original fireplace jambs, a raised hearth and stile and rail paneling. The living room's fireplace has its original Delft tiles, a shallow cornice, dentil border and torus and plain molding.

The west wing's second floor has a large landing with beaded woodwork. It leads to a master bedroom and two smaller bedrooms. The entire floor has its original wideboard flooring. The roof framing uses king post trusses on the collar ties rather than the more commonly used tie beam formation, a construction visible in the master bedroom.

At the extreme east and west end of the house is an old well and cistern respectively. Both are considered contributing resources to its historic character, as are the monument in front of the house, which contains an old Indian mash bowl found on the property. In the rear of the property, about 100 feet (30 m) to the north, are the remains of an old silo with a stone wall, also contributing resources. The garage and storage shed are non-contributing modern additions.

== History ==
The property on which the house stands was originally part of the Rombout Patent, 85,000 acres (34,000 ha) purchased by Francis Rombout and Gulian Verplanck from local Native American tribes in 1682. King James II granted letters patent three years later, allowing Rombout and the heirs of Verplanck, who had died in the interim, to subdivide and sell the land.

In 1759 Derick Hageman bought 108 acres (44 ha) containing the future house property from Catheryna Rombout Brett, a descendant of Francis who had settled in what is now Beacon. She carefully chose buyers with complementary skills and trades in order to sustain agrarian development on her family lands in the interior of the eastern Hudson Valley. He built the west wing of the house and, as a blacksmith by trade, probably forged the door hinges himself.

Ten years later, in 1769, a neighbor, Garret Storm, for whom the hamlet of Stormville is named, bought the property from Hegeman and gave it to his son Thomas as a wedding gift. The younger man added the eastern section. He operated a tavern and store on the site.

During the Revolutionary War, Thomas Storm served as a captain in the Continental Army, which he allowed to camp on the property. The cistern may also have been used as a prison. He stored some flour that had been confiscated by the army from a miller in Massachusetts, and wrote a letter to the Continental Congress, archived in the Library of Congress, requesting funds to reimburse the miller. George Clinton called him "the most honest man in Dutchess County".

In 1778, George Washington, who had the location of the house marked on one of his pocket maps, spent a night. Locals gathered the next morning, and he came out to address them. When they removed their hats at his presence, he advised them to put them back on since he was just an ordinary man like them.

After the war, Thomas Storm was elected to the New York State Assembly for two terms, and then moved to New York City. He became a successful merchant and eventually returned to the Assembly, where he served as Speaker in 1802–03, and later ran for lieutenant governor with Morgan Lewis.

He sold the house in 1785 to John Adriance, a member of a prominent Dutchess County family who later lent their name to Poughkeepsie's library. Upon his death in 1794, the house was sold to George Brinckerhoff. He added the columns and other Federal style decorative touches to the house.

The Brinckerhoff descendants lived in the house throughout the 19th century. In 1880, when the Portaal's flooring was replaced, a trap door to the basement was discovered. In it were a cap, knapsack and book which may have belonged to a Revolutionary-era British prisoner of war kept in the house. Also kept in the house by the Brinckerhoffs was a secretary's desk brought to the colonies by Joris Brinckerhoff in 1638. It is now in the Museum of the City of New York.

T. Van Wyck Brinckerhoff, one of the four generations of that family to own the house, served as the East Fishkill town historian. He was able to locate a misplaced map of the Rombout Patent now in the New York State Library. His daughter Julia kept the house in the family until 1930. That year the state and the local Daughters of the American Revolution chapter placed a monument in front of the house, which included an old Indian millstone found on the land.

It has since remained a private house. Later owners have restored it, and it has been included on historic tours of the county.

== See also ==
- National Register of Historic Places listings in Dutchess County, New York
- List of Washington's Headquarters during the Revolutionary War
