= Rombout =

Rombout is a Dutch masculine given name, equivalent to English Rumbold. It is of Germanic origin, containing the Old Saxon elements -hrôm- ("fame", Dutch roem) and -bald- ("brave"). It is also possible that the first element comes from -Rûma- ("Rome"), a place name that also featured in old Germanic names. Early source usually Latinized Saint Rombout's name as Rumoldus, as in the first known mention in a pre-927 grant by Charles the Simple, mentioning that the Mechelen abbey had been built in his honor ("in honorem S. Rumoldi martyris constructam").

- Saint Rombout (died between 580 and 655), in English known as "Rumbold of Mechelen"
- Rombout Hogerbeets (1561–1625), Dutch statesman
- Rombout II Keldermans (1460–1531), Belgian architect
- Rombout van Troyen (1605–1655), Dutch landscape painter
- Rombout Verhulst (1624–1698), Flemish-Dutch sculptor
- Catheryna Rombout Brett (1687–1764), American businesswoman

== See also ==
- Rombouts, patronymic surname
- Rombout House, a historic home in Poughkeepsie, New York, on land bought by Francis Rombouts in 1683
- Rombout Patent, a grant issued by King James II of England in 1685
