= Fishkill (town), New York =

Fishkill, New York
- Town
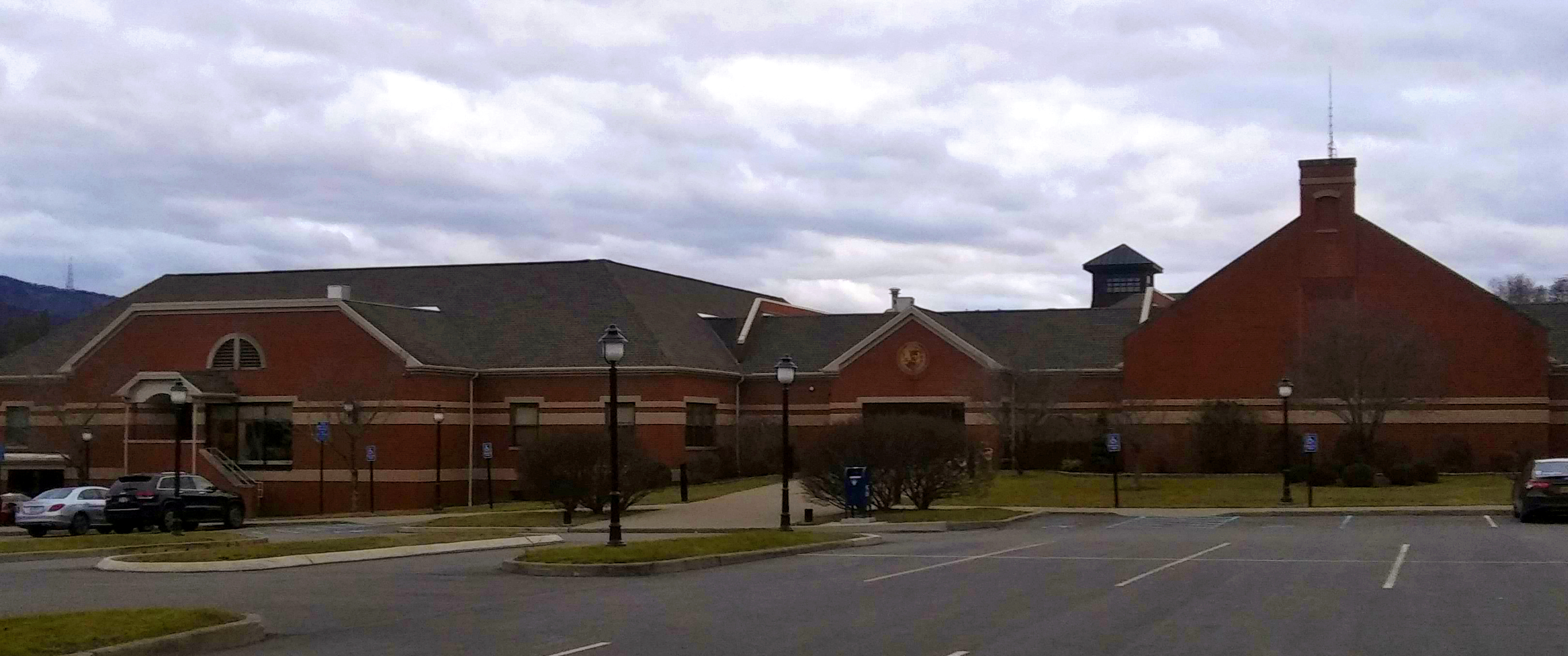
- Town hall

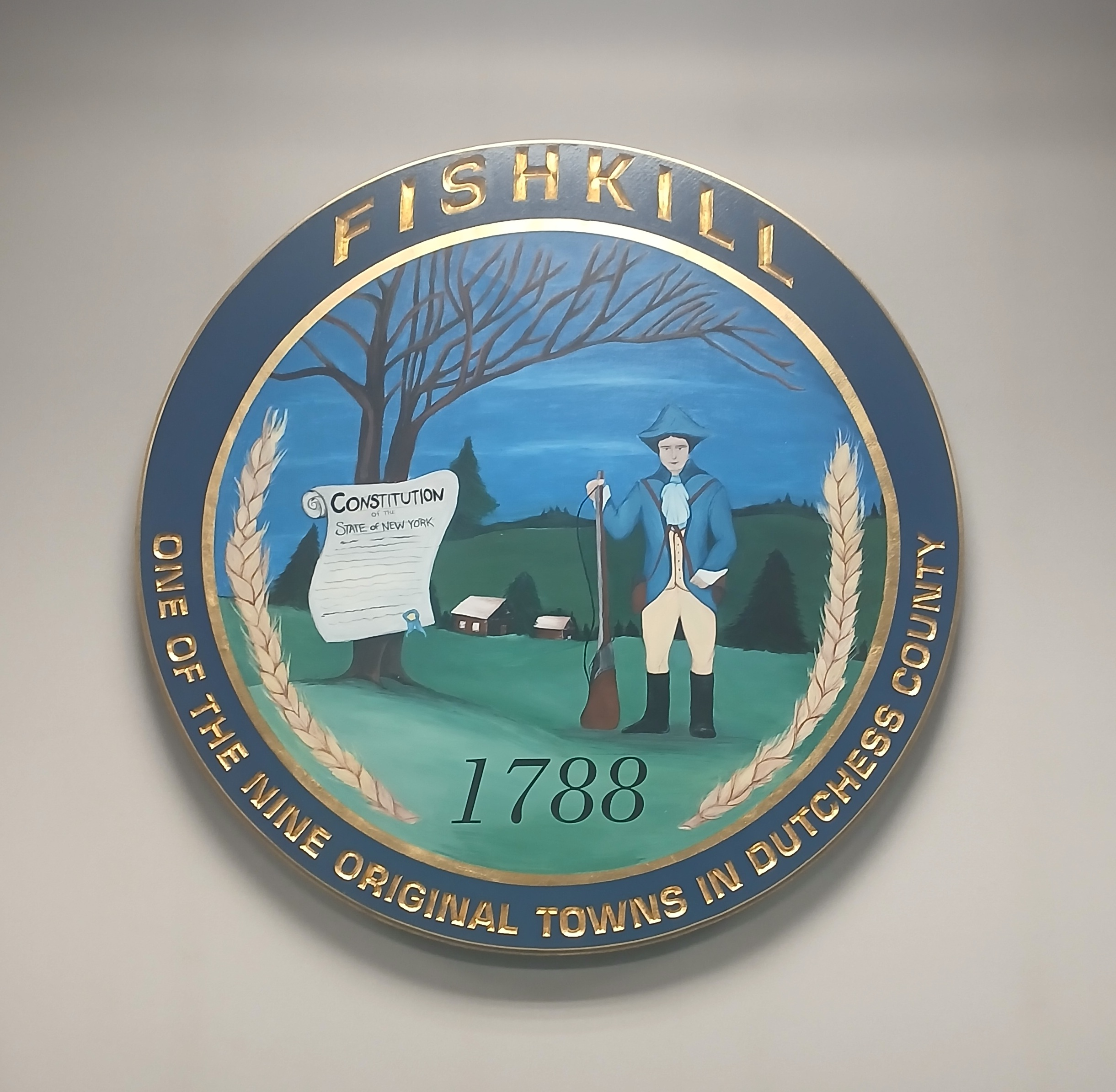
- Seal

- Location of Fishkill, New York
- Coordinates: 41°31′40″N 73°54′54″W
- Country: United States
- State: New York
- County: Dutchess

Government
  - Type: Town Council
  - Town Supervisor: Ozzy Albra (D)
  - Town Council: Gregory Totino (D) John Forman (R) Brian Wrye (R) Jacqueline Bardini (D)

Area
  - Total: 32.0 sq mi (82.9 km^{2})
  - Land: 27.3 sq mi (70.8 km^{2})
  - Water: 4.7 sq mi (12.1 km^{2})
- Elevation: 260 ft (80 m)

Population (2020)
  - Total: 24,226
  - Density: 809/sq mi (312.2/km^{2})
- Time zone: UTC−5 (Eastern (EST))
  - Summer (DST): UTC−4 (EDT)
- ZIP Codes: 12524 (Fishkill); 12527 (Glenham); 12508 (Beacon); 12533 (Hopewell Junction); 12590 (Wappingers Falls)
- Area code: 845
- FIPS code: 36-25978
- GNIS feature ID: 0978958
- Website: www.fishkill-ny.gov

Fishkill is a town in the southwestern part of Dutchess County, New York, United States. It lies approximately 60 miles (97 km) north of New York City. The population was 24,226 at the 2010 census. Fishkill surrounds the city of Beacon, and contains a village, which is also named Fishkill, the majority of the hamlet of Brinckerhoff and the census-designated place of Merritt Park.

The name Fishkill derives from the Dutch words vis kill, meaning "fish creek". The location of Fishkill was known as Tioranda by the Native American peoples. The name means "The place where two waters meet". Fishkill is one of the nine original towns in Dutchess County, and is best known today for its rich history dating to the American Revolutionary War period and scenic views of the Hudson Highlands.

== History ==
In 1683, New York City merchants Francis Rombouts and Gulian Verplanck purchased 85,000 acres (340 km^{2}) in Dutchess County from the Wappinger confederacy of Native Americans for a quantity of goods including rum, powder, and tobacco. In 1685 it was granted as the royal Rombout Patent. Neither ever lived on the land, intending to use it only for fur trading. The first white settlers were Rombout's daughter, Catheryna, and her husband, Roger Brett, who built a mill at the mouth of Fishkill Creek as it flows into the Hudson River.

Originally, the boundaries of Fishkill extended far beyond the boundaries of the present-day Town of Fishkill. When the town was incorporated in 1788, Fishkill's land area included the present-day City of Beacon and Village of Fishkill, as well as the Town of Wappinger, Village of Wappingers Falls, Town of East Fishkill and a portion of the Town of LaGrange. During the 19th century, as other towns incorporated, Fishkill's area was reduced until the incorporation of the City of Beacon in 1913 resulted in Town boundaries approximate to modern town lines.

A number of areas within the town retain their Native American names, including Matteawan Road and the hamlet of Wiccopee, which overlaps into the modern town of East Fishkill. Daniel Nimham, the final sachem of the Wappinger people, was born in the Wiccopee area in 1726.

Fishkill played a pivotal role in the American Revolutionary War when a huge military encampment known as the Fishkill Supply Depot was established one mile (1.6 km) south of the village of Fishkill to guard the mountain pass to the south. Signal fires lay in readiness on tops of the surrounding mountains. The Fishkill encampment became the main supply depot for the northern department of the Continental Army. The first copies of the New York State Constitution were printed at Fishkill in 1777. Mount Beacon, located in the town, earned its name for the signal fires at the summit which were used for Continental Army communications during the war.

As commander of the Continental Army, George Washington spent considerable time in Fishkill, and in 1778, noted Fishkill silversmith John Bailey crafted a sword for Washington near present-day Maurer-Geering Park. The sword was a particular favorite of Washington's, and he carried it for the remainder of the war. Upon his death, Washington bequeathed a sword to each of his five nephews, and nephew Samuel Washington received the Bailey sword. He donated it to Congress in 1843. The sword now lies in the Smithsonian Institution, as part of the National Museum of American History.

Today, the town's economy is diverse, comprising tourism, medical care, retail and restaurants, warehouses, recreation spots and a wealth of small businesses.

In 1996, the animal rights group PETA suggested the town change its name to something less suggestive of violence toward fish. The name derives from the Dutch vis kill, meaning "fish creek." For this reason, the town declined.

In 2021, the Town commissioned an eight-foot bronze statue depicting Daniel Nimham from noted Hudson Valley sculptor Michael Keropian. The statue was installed at the Arrowhead intersection of NY-52 and NY-82 (41° 32.685′ N, 73° 52.16′ W.) in May 2022 and dedicated on June 11, 2022. Town Supervisor Ozzy Albra hosted the ceremony which featured comments from elected officials, educators, the sculptor, and a number of special presentations by Native American community groups.

== Government ==
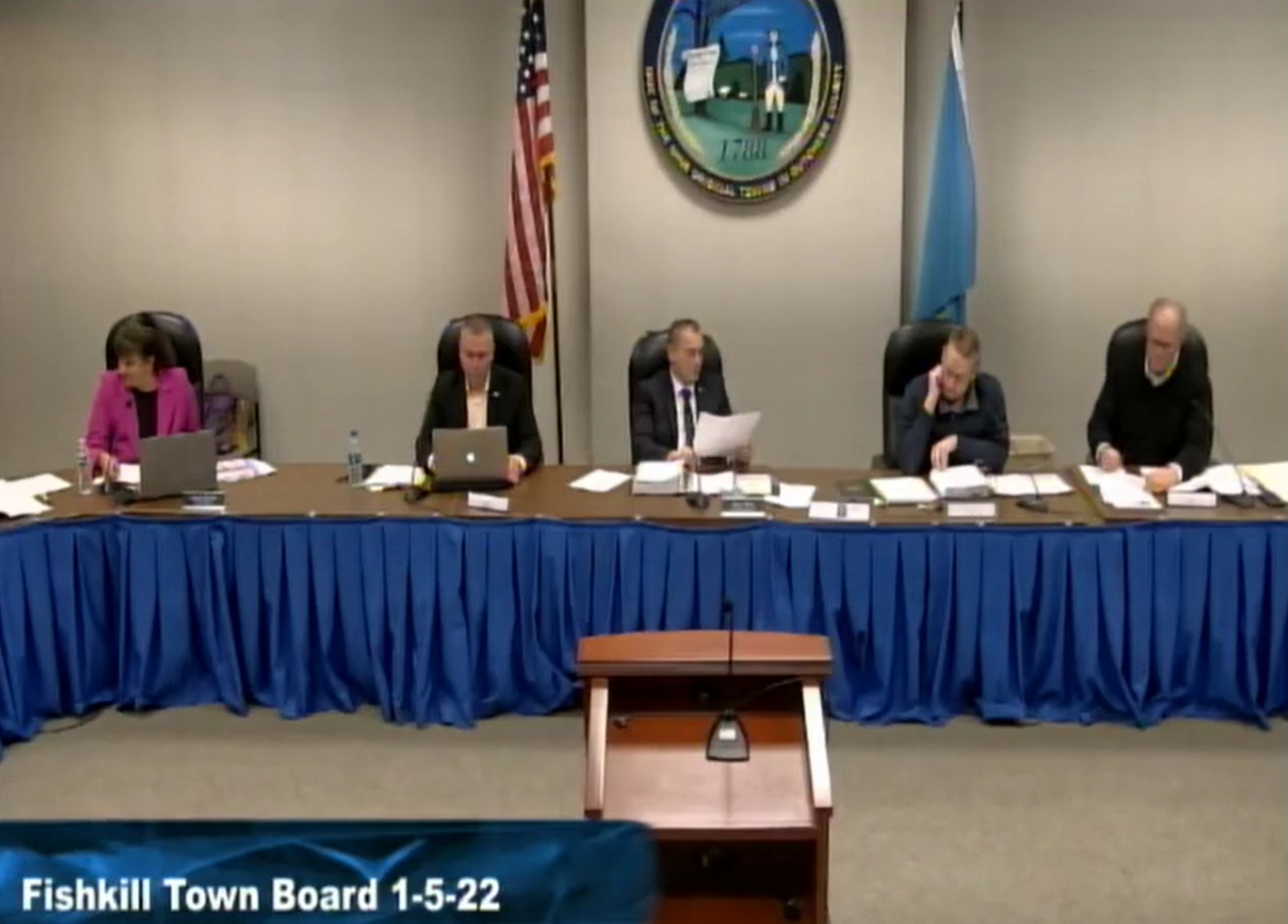
The Town of Fishkill 2025 Town Council, from left to right: Louise Daniele, Carmine Istvan, Ozzy Albra (Sup), John Forman, Brian Wrye.

The Town of Fishkill is overseen by a Town Supervisor a Town Council, comprising four Councilmembers. The Town Supervisor and Town Council are elected to four-year terms, and town law limits the Town Supervisor and Town Council to two terms of service. As of 2025, the Town Supervisor is Ozzy Albra, and the Town Council consists of Jacqueline Bardini, John Forman, Gregory Totino and Brian Wrye.

== Tourism ==
Fishkill is home to a number of tourist locations, including a number of historically significant sites. Popular sites include:

- Dutchess Stadium, home of the Hudson Valley Renegades High-A Minor League Baseball team
- Mount Gulian
- SplashDown Beach, a seasonal water and amusement park
- Stony Kill Farm
- Van Wyck Homestead Museum

== Geography ==
According to the United States Census Bureau, the town has a total area of 32.0 square miles (82.9 km^{2}), of which 27.3 square miles (70.8 km^{2}) is land and 4.7 square miles (12.1 km^{2}), or 14.55%, is water. The elevation of the town varies from sea level along the Hudson River (Fishkill Waterfront, Fishkill Landing, Dutchess Junction) to 1,600 feet (490 m) above sea level (South Beacon Mountain).

The southern town line is the border between Dutchess and Putnam counties and between the towns of Fishkill and Philipstown. The western town line is defined by the Hudson River, across which lie the Orange County towns of Cornwall, New Windsor, and Newburgh, as well as the city of Newburgh. The city of Beacon is contained within the town, though Fishkill's area west of Beacon is mostly occupied by the Hudson. To the north is the town of Wappinger, and to the east is the town of East Fishkill.

The town's namesake, the Fishkill Creek, runs from east to west across the town and empties into the Hudson River. As the word Fishkill derives from the Dutch vis kill, meaning "fish creek," the English use of "Fishkill Creek" creates a bilingual tautology.

Interstate 84 passes through the town in an east-west direction, with access from Exits 41, 44, and 46 and US 9 passes through both the town and village of Fishkill in a north-south direction.

== Demographics ==
Historical population
Census	Pop.	Note	%±
1790	5,941		—
1820	8,203		—
1830	8,292		1.1%
1840	10,437		25.9%
1850	9,240		−11.5%
1860	9,546		3.3%
1870	11,752		23.1%
1880	10,732		−8.7%
1890	11,840		10.3%
1900	13,016		9.9%
1910	13,858		6.5%
1920	2,095		−84.9%
1930	2,890		37.9%
1940	3,615		25.1%
1950	3,863		6.9%
1960	7,083		83.4%
1970	11,935		68.5%
1980	15,506		29.9%
1990	17,655		13.9%
2000	20,258		14.7%
2010	22,107		9.1%
2020	24,226		9.6%
U.S. Decennial Census

As of the census of 2000, there were 20,258 people, 6,856 households, and 4,264 families residing in the town. The population density was 738.9 inhabitants per square mile (285.3/km^{2}). There were 7,040 housing units at an average density of 257 inhabitants per square mile (99.1/km^{2}). The racial makeup of the town was 77.19% White, 14.13% African American, 0.19% Native American, 2.99% Asian, 0.02% Pacific Islander, 4.49% from other races, and 0.99% from two or more races. Of the population 10.47% were Hispanic or Latino of any race.

There were 6,856 households, out of which 27.7% had children under the age of 18 living with them, 51.0% were married couples living together, 8.1% had a woman whose husband does not live with her, and 37.8% were non-families. 32.5% of all households were made up of individuals, and 12.6% had someone living alone who was 65 years of age or older. The average household size was 2.35 and the average family size was 3.02.

In the town, the population was spread out, with 18.3% under the age of 18, 7.1% from 18 to 24, 38.1% from 25 to 44, 22.3% from 45 to 64, and 14.1% who were 65 years of age or older. The median age was 38 years.

The median income for a household in the town was $52,745, and the median income for a family was $63,574. Males had a median income of $42,106 versus $32,198 for females. The per capita income for the town was $22,662. 5.4% of the population and 3.4% of families were below the poverty line. Out of the total people living in poverty, 6.2% were under the age of 18 and 7.5% were 65 or older.

== Sports ==
Fishkill is home to the Hudson Valley Renegades, a minor league baseball team affiliated with the New York Yankees, which plays at Heritage Financial Park in the South Atlantic League.

== Notable residents ==
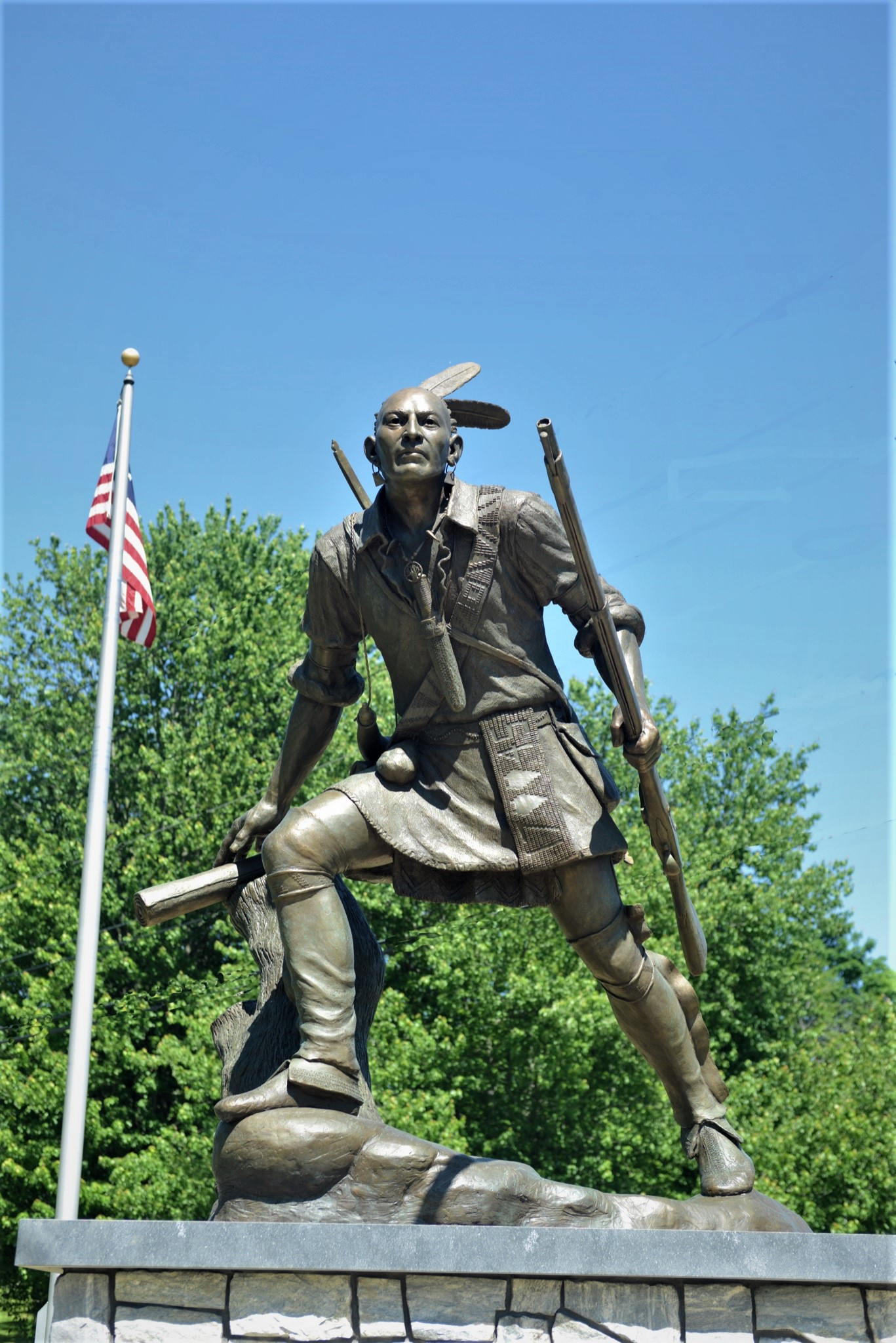
A statue of Fishkill native Daniel Nimham in the Town of Fishkill.

- Elizabeth Allen, theatre, television and film actor and singer; lived in Fishkill prior to her death.
- Catheryna Rombout Brett, landowner and businesswoman; owned a considerable portion of Dutchess County in the colonial period.
- Elijah A. Briggs, American Civil War soldier and Medal of Honor recipient; lived in Fishkill for many years prior to his death.
- Robert Kanigher, comic book, playwright, television and film writer for DC Comics noted for writing Wonder Woman and The Flash lived in Fishkill prior to his death.
- Marquis de Lafayette, French noble and military leader who assisted Washington during the Revolutionary War; was nursed to health after a long illness in Fishkill.
- Daniel Nimham, final sachem of the Wappinger people and American Revolutionary War combat veteran; born in Fishkill in 1726.
- Margaret Sanger, birth control activist and sex educator had her summer home in Fishkill from the mid-1920s until 1949.
- Benjamin Strong Jr., banker and Governor of the Federal Reserve Bank of New York.

== See also ==
- Fishkill Correctional Facility
- Mount Gulian
- Stony Kill Farm
- Van Wyck Homestead Museum
