= Nine Partners Patent =

Nine Partners Patent may refer to:

- The Great Nine Partners Patent (1697), land grant in Dutchess County, New York, USA
- The Little Nine Partners Patent (1706), land grant in Dutchess County, New York, USA
