= George Rymph House =

Oldest house in Hyde Park, New York, US

- U.S. National Register of Historic Places
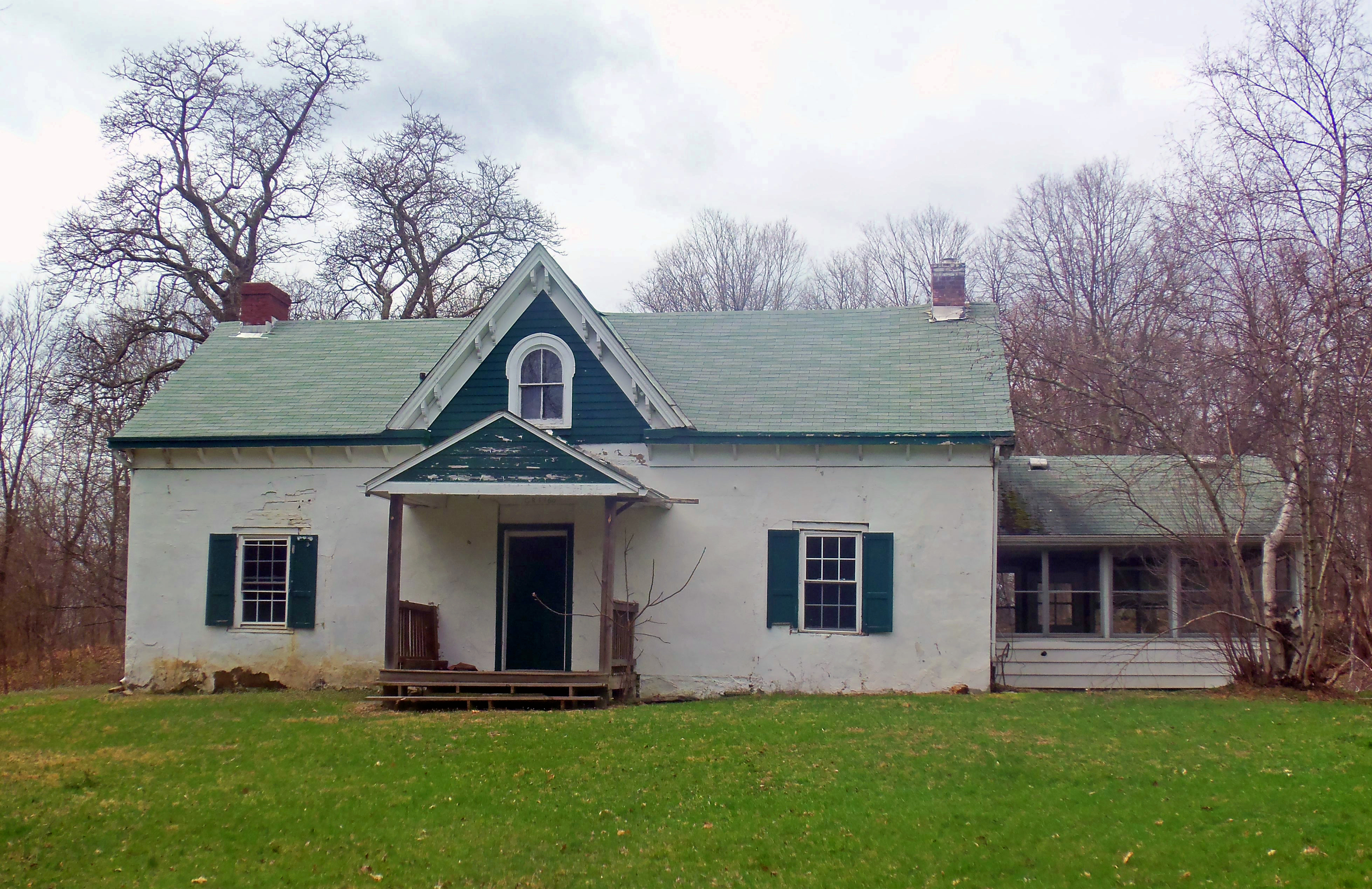
- East elevation, 2013

- Location within New York Location within the United States
- Location: Hyde Park, NY
- Nearest city: Poughkeepsie, NY
- Coordinates: 41°49′21″N 73°56′9″W
- Area: less than one acre
- Built: 1769
- Architectural style: Colonial, Gothic Revival
- NRHP reference No.: 93000863
- Added to NRHP: August 19, 1993

The George Rymph House is a historic house located on Albany Post Road (U.S. Route 9) in Hyde Park, New York, United States. It is a stone house built during the 1760s by a recent German immigrant. In 1993, it was listed on the National Register of Historic Places.

It is one of the few remaining pre-Revolutionary houses in Hyde Park, the oldest stone house, and second-oldest house overall in the town. The Rymph family retained ownership of the house until selling it in the early 20th century to the Dominican Fathers who owned most of the surrounding property at the time. Several renovations, including a stucco exterior, have modified the original appearance.

It served as a cottage for the camp's caretaker until the early 21st century, when the land conservation organization Scenic Hudson bought the property. The house has been vacant since then. Scenic Hudson has been trying to sell or lease the house to a party interested in restoring and preserving it.

== Building ==
The house is located on the west side of the road roughly 1.4 miles (2.3 km) north of the Vanderbilt Mansion National Historic Site at the north end of downtown Hyde Park and 1 mile (1.6 km) south of the hamlet of Staatsburg. The surrounding terrain is gently rolling, just east of a 100-foot (30 m) rise up from the Hudson River a quarter-mile (400 m) to the west. It is extensively wooded, with a few clearings for a nearby yacht club to the south, the former summer camp on the property, and the Anderson Center for Autism a thousand feet (300 m) to the north. On the opposite side of the road, is a large tract of unbroken woods extending almost to New York State Route 9G two miles (3.2 km) to the east.

The house's main block is a one-and-a-half-story three-bay structure of uncoursed fieldstone on an exposed stone foundation. It is topped with a cross-gabled roof sheathed in asphalt shingles and pierced by brick chimneys on either end. There are additions on the north and west sides, and small porticos sheltering both entrances.

On the east (front) facade, the stone has been covered with stucco, which was later scored to suggest a smooth-cut ashlar pattern. It has begun to flake and spall near the roof and foundation lines on the south of the main entrance. A short set of unpainted wooden steps leads up to a porch of the same material, with guardrails on the sides. Two plain square pillars support the gabled portico roof, with clapboard in the gable field. To its sides, each bay has one double-hung six-over-six sash window with paneled wooden shutters. A wide plain frieze with simple cornice and bracketed eaves mark the roofline. The gable field above the main entrance is built of timber frame. It, too, is faced in clapboard. In its middle, is an arched two-over-two double-hung sash window. Its roofline has a similar treatment as the one below, except for having smaller brackets in pairs.

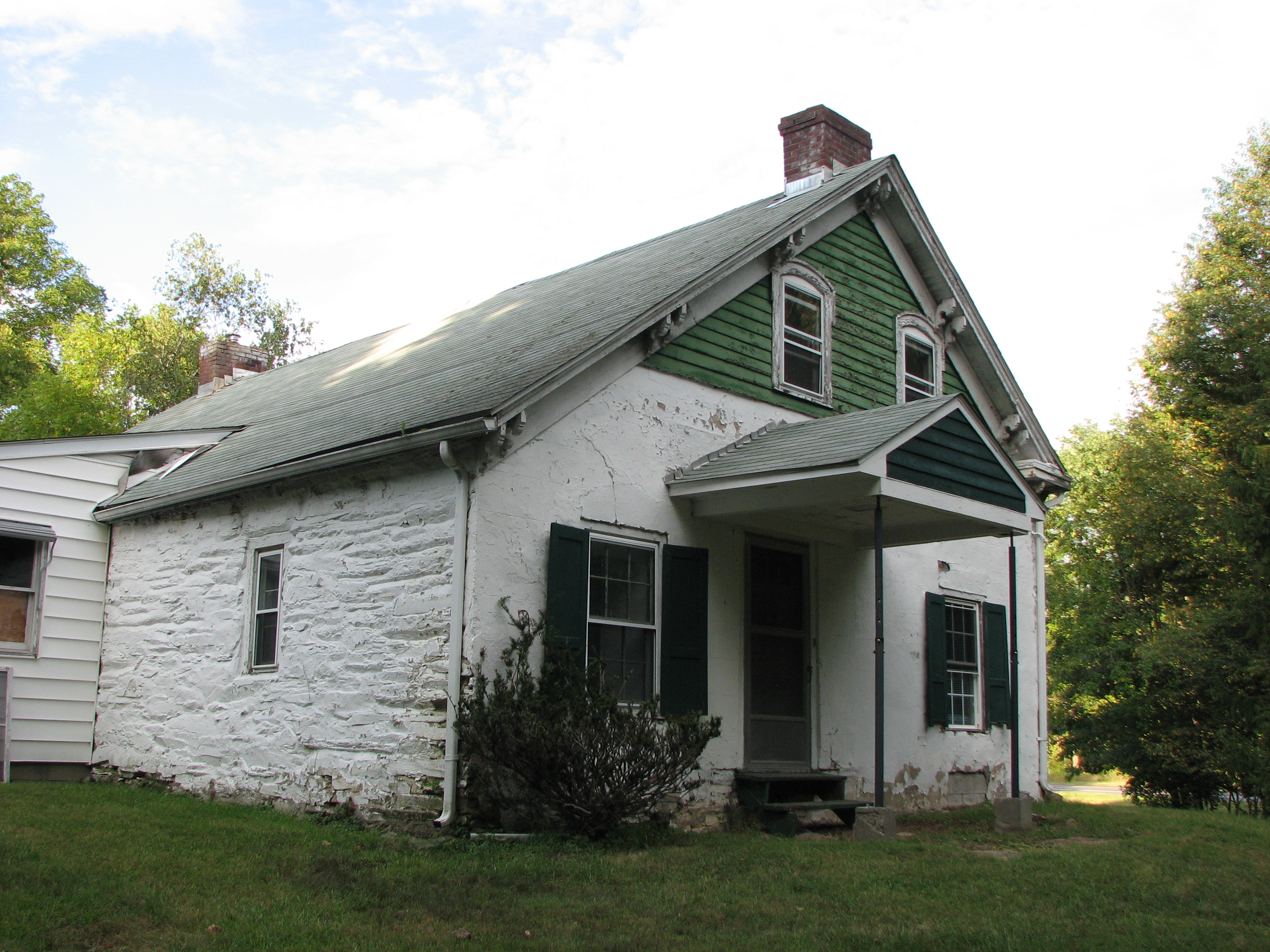
South profile and partial west elevation, 2014

On the south, the windows, entrance and facade treatment of the first story are identical to that of the east. The portico-roof is supported by narrow metal poles, but is otherwise the same as its larger counterpart on the east. The gable field above it similarly set in clapboard, however, has two smooth-arched one-over-one double-hung sash windows. The roofline treatment matches that on the east cross-gable.

The stone on the west elevation is not stuccoed, only painted. A single narrow one-over-one separates the south corner from a shed-roofed addition with modern siding and paired storm windows in each face. On the north is another, similar addition, larger and with a smaller gabled roof. It has almost continuous screened windows, serving as a sunroom. There is no stucco on that side of the main block, either.

A plain molded surround, topped by blocks with bulls-eye centers, sets off the main entrance door. Above it, on the lintel, is carved "GR 1769". The door itself has four lights on its top and four wooden panels below.

Inside, the house has many of its interior features intact. It has a central hall with wide planked wooden flooring. In the rooms are original mantels; the kitchen has a large stone fireplace with wooden lintel. Many of the original wooden four-paneled doors remain. The original ceiling hand-hewn exposed beams are still present, and the staircase to the garret features an original wooden newel post and balustrade, among many other original wooden and plaster finishes in the house.

== History ==
From its establishment in the first years of the 18th century, Hyde Park, named for Edward Hyde, the provincial governor who granted the land, was largely undeveloped woods with a few tenant farmers. John Bard, a New York City physician, inherited through marriage 3,600 acres (1,500 ha) of the original Fauconnier patent between Crum Elbow Creek and the Enderkill in 1763 as a retirement property. Financial problems five years later forced him to offer the property for sale.

He never sold the entire property, but did sell some of it. Johannes George Rymph (sometimes spelled Rim in records from the era), a filemaker who had come to the Hudson Valley from Wittenburg, Germany, a few years earlier, bought a 215-acre (87 ha) land lot stretching west from the river. The following year he built the house, carving his initials and the year 1769 in the lintel above the main entrance.

At that time it looked somewhat different. It was limited to the current main block, and did not have its porticoes, either. The fieldstone walls and foundation were visible and unpainted on all sides. The size and form of the house, as well as features of the roof like the steeply pitched gables, framed ends, and chimney placement are typical of the vernacular architecture built by most European settlers of the time. the house's center-hall, double-pile interior plan, topped by a garret, is more common on the west side of the Hudson, however.

Rymph eventually expanded the farmstead to 600 acres (240 ha). On his death in 1791, the house and land were left to his wife and ten children. They remained on the land, gradually subdividing it over the 19th century. Around 1850, the house was altered for the first time, when the Gothic Revival dormer window over the main entrance was added. At some point after that, the interior was remodeled to contemporary Victorian tastes and the exterior likely stuccoed, according to a local historian who believes that the house reflects that era to a much greater extent than it does the time of its construction.

The Rymphs owned the house until 1915, when they sold it to the Dominican Order. It was then used as the caretaker's cottage on the 50-acre (20 ha) summer camp they established with the remaining portion of George Rymph's original 1768 purchase. They also remodeled it in a Colonial Revival style, adding the north and west wings and two porticoes with Doric columns and further obscuring its original appearance.

The Dominicans still owned the property when it was added to the National Register in 1993, as the second oldest house in Hyde Park, and oldest stone house in the town. Scenic Hudson, a land trust, purchased the 72-acre (29 ha) property in 2007 to conserve 700 feet (210 m) of river shoreline and the viewshed from another of the organization's parks across the river, the Black Creek Preserve, in Esopus.

Two years later, the town planning board granted Scenic Hudson a lot split, putting the Rymph House on its own 2.1 acres (8,500 m^{2}) parcel. This allowed the organization to offer the property for sale or lease the following year to a person or entity willing to restore and preserve it.

== See also ==
- National Register of Historic Places listings in Dutchess County, New York
