= Rombouts =

Rombouts is a surname of Flemish-Dutch origin, meaning "son of Rombout". People with this name include

- Adriaen Rombouts (c. 1640 – in or after 1670), Flemish genre painter active in Brussels
- Cataryna Rombouts Brett (1687–1764), New York landowner, daughter of Francis Rombouts
- Damascenus Rombouts (1878–1946), Dutch Franciscan priest
- Francis Rombouts (1631–1691), Flemish-born Mayor of New York City from 1679 to 1680
- Gillis Rombouts (1630–1672), Dutch landscape painter from Haarlem
- Jan Rombouts the Elder (c.1480–1535), Flemish painter, draftsman, printmaker and glass designer
- Linda Rombouts (born 1953), Belgian speed skater
- Luc Rombouts (born 1962), Belgian carillon player
- Salomon Rombouts (1655–1702), Dutch painter, son of Gillis
- Theodoor Rombouts (1597–1637), Flemish genre painter
- Tinne Rombouts (born 1979), Flemish politician
- Ton Rombouts (born 1951), Dutch politician

== Companies ==
- Rombouts Coffee a Flemish coffee company, founded by Frans Rombouts in 1896 which introduced a one-cup filter coffee

== See also ==
- Rombout (disambiguation)
- Saint Rombout
- Sint-Romboutskathedraal, Mechelen, Belgium
- Sint-Romboutscollege, Mechelen, Belgium
