= Stony Kill Farm =

- U.S. National Register of Historic Places
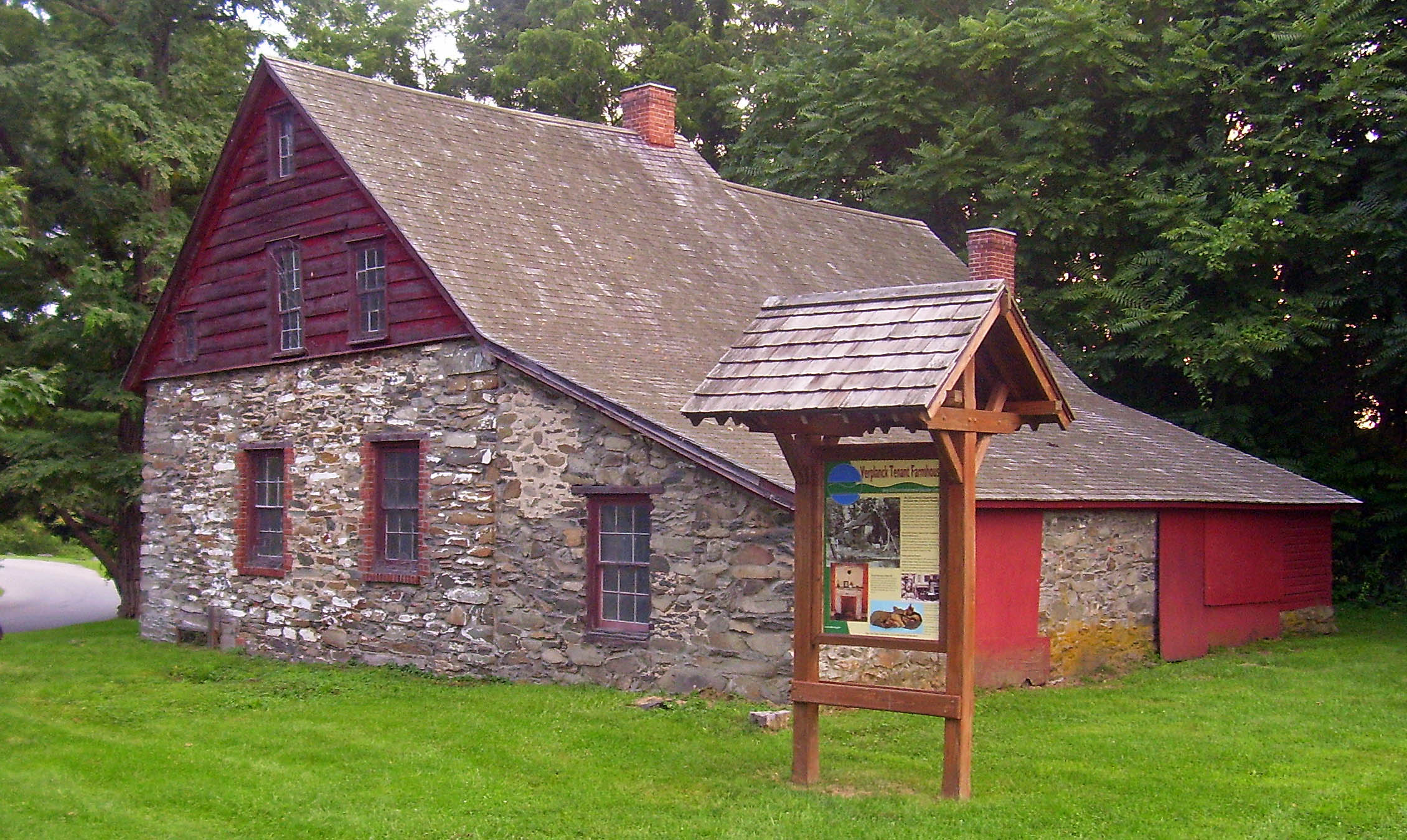
- Verplanck Tenant Farmhouse in 2007
- Location: Town of Fishkill, NY
- Nearest city: Poughkeepsie
- Coordinates: 41°32′24″N 73°57′15″W
- Area: 756 acres (3 km²)
- Built: 18th and 19th centuries
- NRHP reference No.: 80002601
- Added to NRHP: 1980

Stony Kill Farm Environmental Education Center is located on NY 9D in the Town of Fishkill, New York, United States. It is a 1,000+ acre (3 km^{2}) working farm owned by the state Department of Environmental Conservation (DEC) as an environmental education center. The nonprofit Stony Kill Foundation is responsible for its daily operations.

Today, Stony Kill is a working farm and is home to numerous livestock. It also offers educational programs and an "Open Barn" event.

The nonprofit Common Ground Farm rents property to grow flowers, vegetables, and herbs on the grounds. There is also a community garden, greenhouse, haying fields, pastures, and the Verplanck Memorial Perennial Garden. Additionally, the property offers hiking, fishing, and birding to the public.

== History ==
In 1683, settlers Gulian Verplanck and Francis Rombout bought the 85,000-acre (430 km^{2}) tract, including the farm, from the Wappinger people for goods worth approximately $1,250. In 1708 the Great Partition of this land put the area around the farm in the Verplanck family's hands. Instead of working it themselves, they took in tenant farmers to keep the land worked and productive. They built the stone tenant farmhouse near the property's main entrance in four sections between the late 17th and early 19th centuries.

An 1836 subdivision of the property gave a thousand acres (4 km^{2}), including the current farm, to descendant James DeLancy Verplanck of nearby Beacon. He had a Greek Revival home, now known as the Manor House, built and moved into it in 1842. The building is now used as a visitor center.

A century later, his descendants donated the farm to the state Education Department (SED) for use as a teaching farm. It was used for this purpose by SUNY Farmingdale until the late 1960s, when the college decided it no longer needed the property. In 1973, DEC took it over and converted it to its present use. The Stony Kill Foundation was created in 1977 and installed a community garden.

Stony Kill was added to the National Register of Historic Places in 1980. A classroom was added to the barn in the 1980s. Descendants of the Verplanck family donated funds to create the Verplanck Memorial Perennial Garden in 1997.

Following financial difficulties that nearly closed the farm, the Stony Kill Foundation took over daily operations in 2010. Stony Kill's Learning Center was reopened in 2020.
