= Fauconnier Patent =

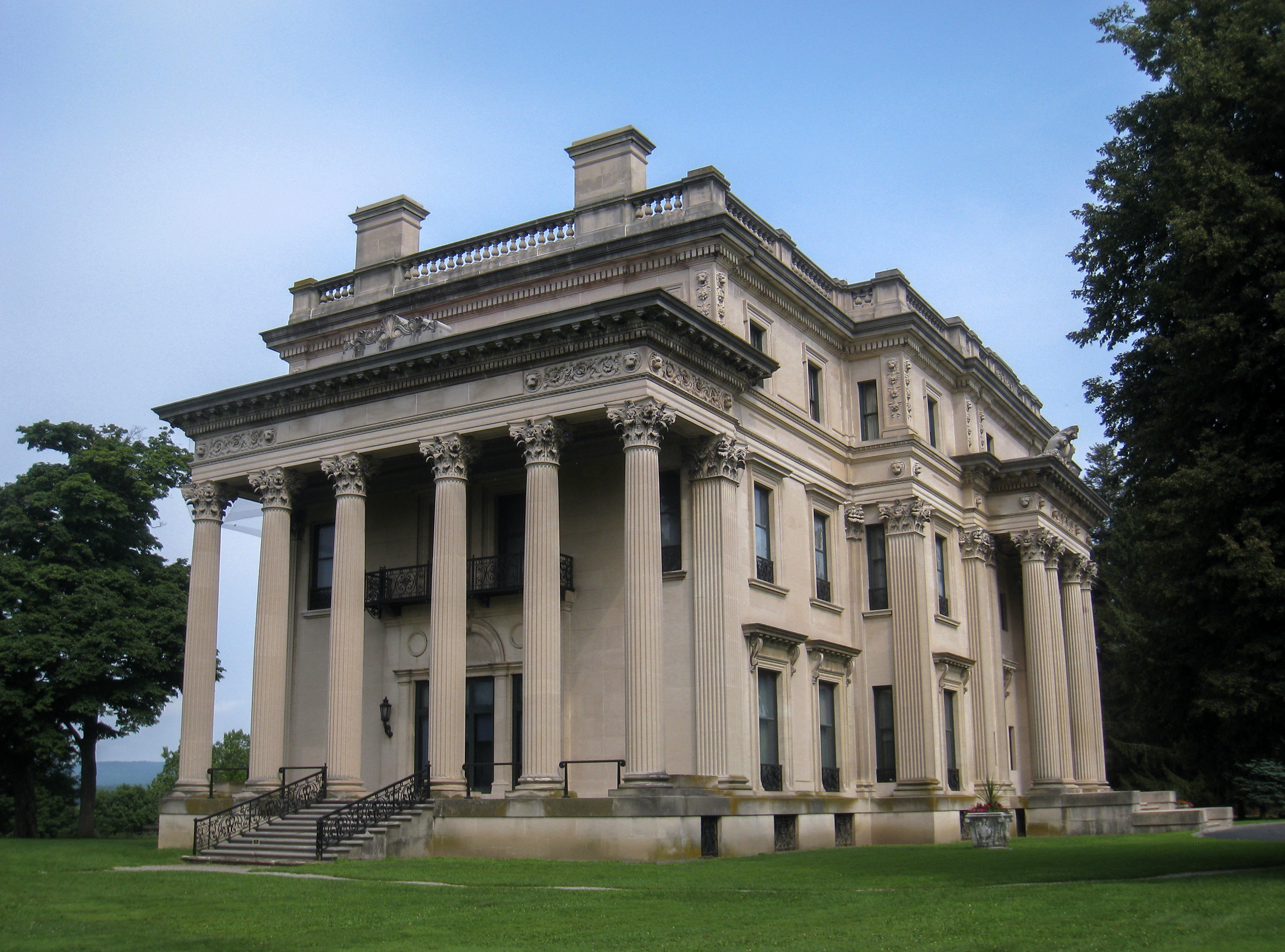
The Vanderbilt Mansion is a highlight of the land patented by Peter Fauconnier and his three partners in 1705

The Fauconnier Patent was a royal land patent granted in 1705 in Dutchess County, Province of New York. It was the twelfth of fourteen granted between 1685 and 1706 that came to comprise the entirety of the historic county footprint (which until 1812 included today's Putnam County).

The first ten, granted between 1685 and 1697, covered almost all of Hudson River shoreline in the original county, with three - Rombouts, the Great Nine Partners, and Philipse Patents - extending significantly inland. The eleventh, and smallest, Cuyler (1697), was the first to contain solely inland territory, just in from the Hudson. The twelfth, and next smallest, Fauconnier (1705), completed the Hudson River shoreline. The last two, Beekman (1705), and the Little Nine Partners (1706), laid claim to the remaining interior lands.

== History ==
Some time in or before 1695 Henry Pawling applied for a royal land patent on what was believed to have been a 6000-acre lot bordering on the east bank of the Hudson River in the north of today's Hyde Park, New York. He died in 1696, and the patent, today known as the Pawling-Staats Patent, was subsequently granted to his widow May 11, 1696.

After Pawling's death it was determined that the area surrounding his patent actually contained considerable additional land. A new survey was done and an additional 4,000 acres was defined on the south of the plot. In 1704, a group of five men referred to as Jacob Regnier & Company, which included Peter Fauconnier, petitioned Sir Edward Hyde, Lord Cornbury and Governor of the Province of New York, for the extra land. A patent for a tract that extended from the Hudson River east to the Crum Elbow Creek (which includes much of today's town of Hyde Park) was granted on April 18, 1705. The partners each received one-fifth of the tract. Upon division into lots by the partners Fauconnier received a valuable stretch of river-front property which would later be known as the Vanderbilt Estate.

=== Partners ===
Five partners applied for the patent today known by the name "Fauconnier" – Jacob Regnier, Peter Fauconnier, Benjamin Ask, Barne Cosens, and John Persons.

Some detail is known about Peter Fauconnier (1659-1745).

[He] was a Huguenot who, like many others, fled France in 1685 after the Edict of Nantes was revoked. He served in various positions in the court of Queen Anne and was appointed Secretary to Lord Cornbury in 1702. No physical changes were made to the land during this time. However, it appears that Fauconnier was the first one to name the area 'Hyde Park', probably in honor of Cornbury, Sir Edward Hyde.

In addition to becoming one of three Commissioners of the office of Collector and Receiver-General of the Province, he subsequently became Surveyor General of the Province of New York. It is said that he took advantage of this position to further his interest in land patents – and indeed he came to hold an interest in several in the area, including the Minnisinck and Little Nine Partners.

When Fauconnier died April 10, 1745, his share in the Fauconnier patent was inherited by his daughter, Magdalene Fauconnier Valleau. In 1740, Fauconnier's granddaughter Suzanne Vallaeu married an up-and-coming New Jersey physician, John Bard.

Six years later Bard moved to New York, and by 1764 had inherited most of the Fauconnier share of the original patent. By then a leading local physician and first president of the New York Medical Society, the enterprising Bard went on to reconstitute the original tract by purchasing parcels of land that had been previously sold by Fauconnier.

According to the U.S. National Park Service's Vanderbilt Mansion National Historic Site:

With this ample property at his disposal, he made plans to retire from medical practice and develop the Hyde Park estate into a working farm and country seat. His son, Samuel, then 22 and a medical student in Edinburgh, was eager to assist him inlaying out the grounds and offered to have a plan drawn in Scotland. No records indicate that such a plan was created. Dr. John Bard's estate at Hyde Park was developed to a lesser degree than the aspirations of his son.

Unlike his successors at Hyde Park, Dr. John Bard seemed to have little interest in the scenic qualities of the Hudson River and instead viewed it solely as a means of transporting goods and supplies. Shortly after 1764, he established a farm on what is now the east side of the Albany Post Road, which included a farm house, barn, an orchard of between 500 and 600 apple trees, as well as meadows, upland, etc. He also had three boat landings on the Hudson River. Bard seemed plagued by financial difficulties, and in 1768, he put the entire property up for sale.

Bard did not sell his entire property in 1768, but, over the next thirty years, he sold about 1,500 acres of the original 3,600. He also abandoned temporarily the idea of retiring to country life. In 1772, however, he returned and built a house near his farm complex. Financial losses from investments in mining and iron works caused Dr. Bard to return to medical practice in New York City after the American Revolution, where he formed a partnership with his son, Dr. Samuel Bard. In 1798 at the age of 83, he returned again to Hyde Park, dying there in 1799.

== See also ==
- Dutchess County land patents
- Little Nine Partners Patent
