= Elijah A. Briggs =

- Born: October 26, 1843; Salisbury, Connecticut
- Died: March 10, 1922 (aged 78); Beacon, New York
- Burial place: Fishkill Rural Cemetery
- Military career
- Allegiance: United States of America
- Branch: United States Army
- Rank: Sergeant
- Unit: 2nd Regiment Connecticut Volunteer Heavy Artillery - Company B
- Awards: Medal of Honor

Elijah A. Briggs (October 26, 1843 – March 10, 1922) was an American soldier who fought in the American Civil War. Briggs received the country's highest award for bravery during combat, the Medal of Honor, for his action at Petersburg, Virginia on 3 April 1865. He was honored with the award on 10 May 1865.

== Biography ==
Briggs was born on October 26, 1843, in Salisbury, Connecticut, and raised in Lime Rock, Connecticut. He enlisted into the 2nd Connecticut Heavy Artillery on July 18, 1862, at 17 years old. On June 12, 1864, he was wounded by a gunshot to the forehead on the final day of the Battle of Cold Harbor and was incapacitated for several weeks. Although his official Medal of Honor citation cites his capture of a Confederate battle flag during the Siege of Petersburg, he is also credited with capturing a flag during the Battle of Sailor's Creek.

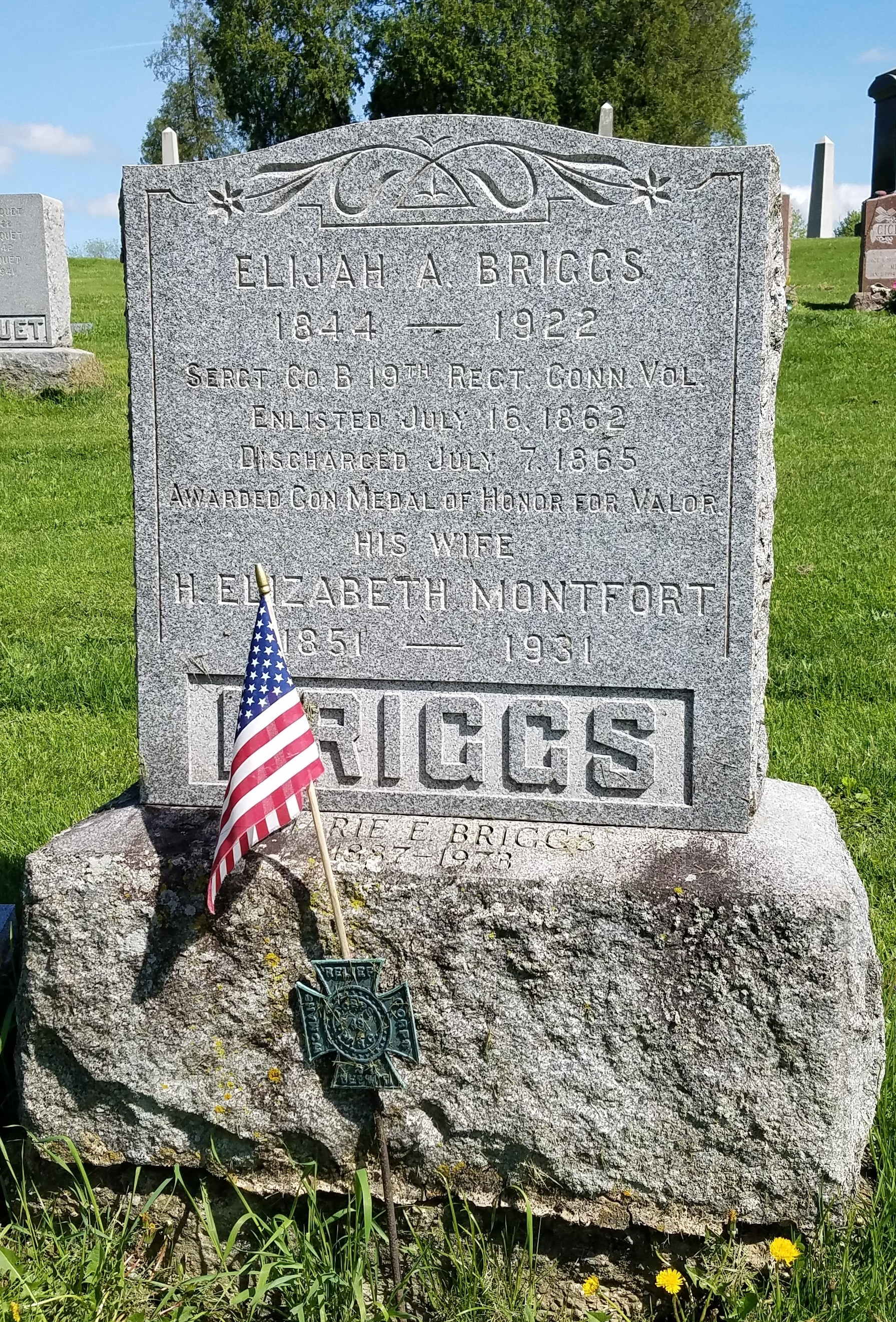
Briggs' grave at Fishkill Rural Cemetery

Briggs was honorably discharged at the end of the war and returned to Lime Rock before relocating to Beacon, New York. On June 24, 1874, he married H. Elizabeth Montfort with whom he had one daughter. Briggs was a member of the Grand Army of the Republic, Independent Order of Odd Fellows and the local Methodist Episcopal Church. He died on March 10, 1922, and his remains are interred at Fishkill Rural Cemetery in Fishkill, New York.

== Medal of Honor citation ==
Capture of battle flag.

== See also ==
- List of American Civil War Medal of Honor recipients: A–F
