= John Bailey (cutler) =

John Bailey (born 1736) was an American cutler and metalworker. Born in Sheffield, England, he moved to New York City in 1755 and set up his own metalworking business 1771. He was married to Anne Brigstoke later that same year. After the British occupation he moved to Frederickstown and later in 1778 to Fishkill, where he continued his cutlery business. He also owned and operated a 200-acre farm just outside Fishkill.

In 1784, Bailey returned to New York and was granted American citizenship. Despite applying to George Washington for a post minting coinage for the new United States, Bailey was not granted a commission.

== Washington's sword ==
Bailey is best known as the creator of George Washington's Battle Sword, a lightweight sword around three feet in length, which he constructed in Fishkill. The sword showcases the jade-green stained hilt design for which Bailey was well known. Following Washington's death, it was bequeathed to his nephew, Samuel T. Washington, whose son presented it to Congress in 1843.
