= Merritt Park, New York =

- Census-designated place
- Location of Merritt Park, New York
- Coordinates: 41°32′19″N 73°52′21″W
- Country: United States
- State: New York
- County: Dutchess
- Town: Fishkill

Area
  - Total: 0.44 sq mi (1.15 km^{2})
  - Land: 0.44 sq mi (1.15 km^{2})
  - Water: 0 sq mi (0.00 km^{2})
- Elevation: 285 ft (87 m)

Population (2020)
  - Total: 1,647
  - Density: 3,722.7/sq mi (1,437.34/km^{2})
- Time zone: UTC-5 (Eastern (EST))
  - Summer (DST): UTC-4 (EDT)
- ZIP Code: 12524 (Fishkill)
- Area code: 845
- FIPS code: 36-46750
- GNIS feature ID: 2584278

Merritt Park is a census-designated place (CDP) in the town of Fishkill in Dutchess County, New York, United States. As of the 2020 census it had a population of 1,647.

The CDP is located in the eastern part of the town of Fishkill in southwestern Dutchess County. It is bordered to the west by the village of Fishkill, to the north by Fishkill Creek, to the southeast by 904-foot (276 m) Honness Mountain, and to the northeast by New York State Route 52. Merritt Boulevard is the main thoroughfare through the community, connecting NY 52 to the northeast with U.S. Route 9 in the southern part of Fishkill village.

== Geography ==
According to the U.S. Census Bureau, the Merritt Park CDP has a total area of 0.44 square miles (1.15 km^{2}), all land.

== Demographics ==
Historical population
Census	Pop.	Note	%±
2020	1,647		—
U.S. Decennial Census
