= Madam Brett Homestead =

Historic house in New York, United States

- Madam Catharyna Brett Homestead
- U.S. National Register of Historic Places
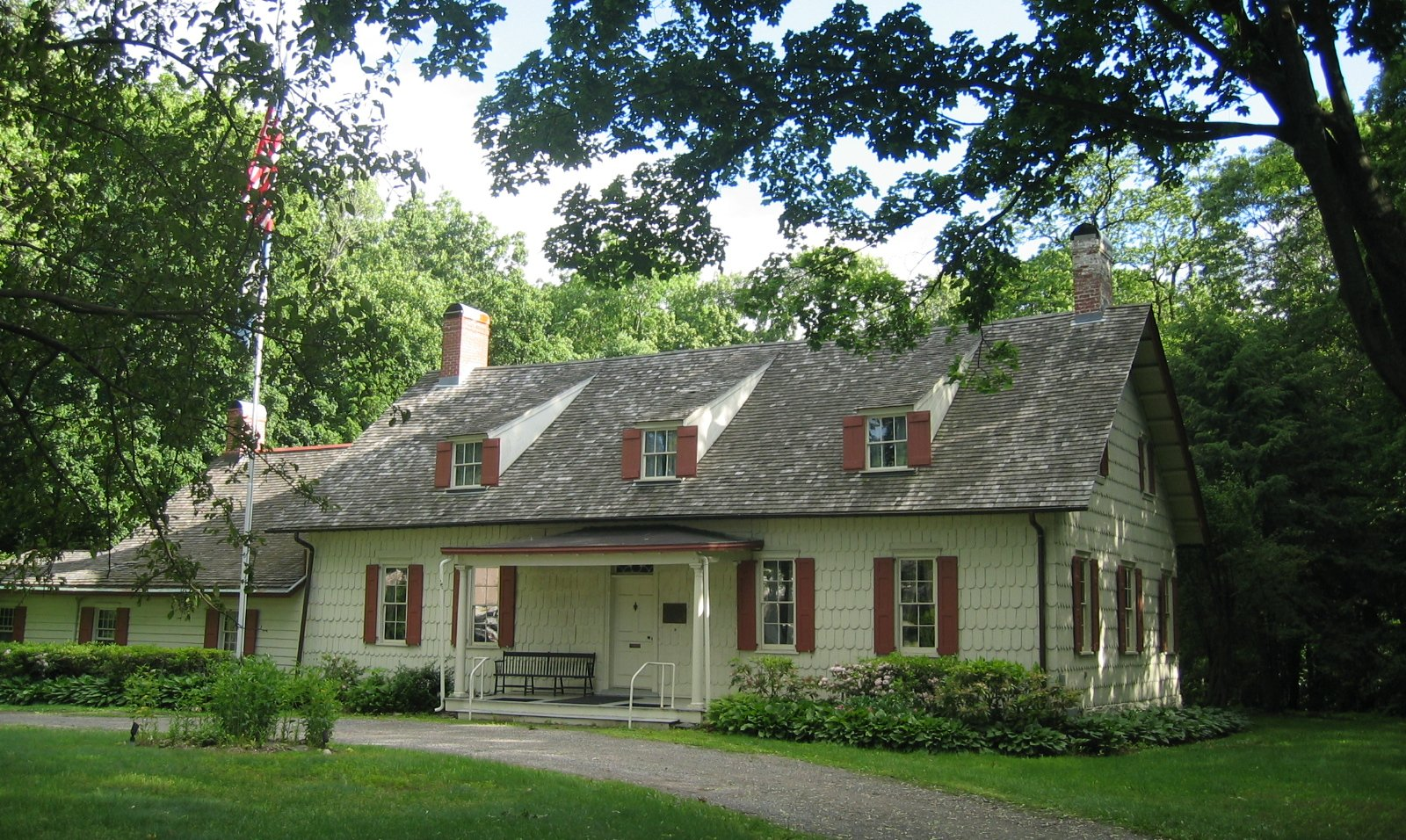
- Front side of the house in 2006
- Location: 50 Van Nydeck Ave., Beacon, NY
- Coordinates: 41.50223°N 73.96713°W
- Built: 1709
- Architect: Robert Dengee
- NRHP reference No.: 76001212
- Added to NRHP: December 12, 1976

The Madam Brett Homestead is an early-18th-century home located in the city of Beacon, New York, United States. It is the oldest standing building in southern Dutchess County and has been listed in the National Register of Historic Places since 1976. It is also listed on the NYS Independence Trail.

== Madam Brett ==
Catheryna Rombout Brett (1687–1764) was the daughter of Helena Teller Bogardus Van Ball Rombout and Francis Rombout. Helena Teller was the daughter of William Teller, of Albany, one of the original patent holders of the area around Schenectady. Francis Rombout served as a lieutenant during Stuyvesants' expedition against New Sweden. In partnership with Gulyne Verplank, Rombout became a successful merchant fur-trader, and in 1679, Mayor of New York. In 1683, Rombout and Verplanck purchased about 85,000 acres (34,000 ha) from the Wappinger native Indians. The purchased was confirmed October 17, 1685, as the royal Rombout Patent issued by King James II to Francis Rombout, Jacobus Kipp (who married the widowed Henrica Verplank) and Stephanus Van Courtland. The original document is on display at the Homestead. Francis Rombout died in 1691, leaving his estate to his only surviving heir, Catheryna.

In November 1703, at the age of sixteen, Catheryna Rombout married Roger Brett, who had arrived in the New World with Lord Cornbury, governor of New York. Brett was a well-respected lieutenant in the British Royal Navy. After their marriage, the Bretts moved into the Rombout family home, which consisted of a large house and spacious grounds on lower Broadway, not far from the present site of Trinity Church on Broadway. Roger Brett was a vestryman of Trinity Church from 1703 to 1706.

== History ==
About 1708, the Rombout Patent was partitioned: the Van Cortlandt family was allotted substantially all the land lying along both banks of what was called Wappinger Creek; the middle portion fell to the heirs of Gulian Verplanck, and the lower part along Fishkill, fell to the Bretts. Catheryna inherited around 28,000 acres (11,000 ha).

The homestead, which during the 19th century was referred to as the "Teller House", is now named for Catheryna Rombout Brett, who was the first to develop the patent by selling property. After the death of Catheryna's mother, the couple mortgaged the manor house in New York and moved to the wilderness of southern Dutchess County. The home was built around 1709 or shortly thereafter. Roger Brett drowned in the Hudson River, leaving Catheryna a widow at age 31 with the surviving three of her four sons. The homestead is notable as the residence of this woman who as a widow organized with twenty-one men the first produce cooperative in the Hudson River highlands. The homestead was subsequently occupied by her descendants until 1954, spanning a total of seven generations.

During the American Revolutionary War, the homestead remained in the family by Madam Brett's granddaughter Hanna Brett Schenck and husband Major Henry Schenck and the building was used for shelter and as a storage facility by the Americans. Revolutionary leaders such as George Washington, the Marquis de La Fayette, and Baron von Steuben are said to have been guests in the house.

In 1800, Catheryna Rombout Brett's great-granddaughter Alice Schenck Teller purchased the house from her widowed mother and together with her husband Isaac Teller remodeled it. After Isaac's death the house opened as a boarding house and "Teller's Villa" was advertised in New York City during the Cholera epidemic. John Pintard, the founding-father of the New York Historical Society, wrote to his daughter of his stay there during the summer of 1833. It was called the "Teller Mansion" because so many members of the Teller family were involved in politics, and after one hundred years the fifth generation were of the Teller name. Teller Avenue in Beacon, New York, was the cow path to the family barns.

== Description ==
Catheryna Brett sold nearly a third of her inheritance before her death. The property now consists of nearly six acres (2.4 ha) of Madam Brett's original inheritance and features a garden, woodlands, and a meandering brook with a New York Big Tree. The homestead's notable features include hand-hewn scalloped cedar shingles, sloped dormers, Dutch doors, and a native stone foundation. Original furnishings include a significant collection of China-trade porcelain and many fine pieces of 18th- and 19th-century furniture. Also noteworthy are the wide-board floors, hand-hewn beams, and the large hearth of the kitchen fireplace.

== Today ==
In 1954, the building was considered for demolition to make room for a supermarket. Instead, it was purchased by the Melzingah Chapter of the Daughters of the American Revolution and turned into a museum preserving a total of seventeen rooms.

The Madam Brett Homestead is located near Fishkill Creek, at 50 Van Nydeck Avenue, Beacon, New York 12508.

== Madam Brett Park ==
Madam Brett Park's 12 acres (4.9 ha) hug Fishkill Creek, which played a prominent role in Beacon's development. Along it stood a gristmill owned by the park's namesake – Catheryna Rombout Brett (1687–1764), with her husband Roger the first European settlers in the present-day city. The mill was an important gathering place for farmers and Native Americans inhabiting both shores of the Hudson River hereabouts. In the 1800s, the creek powered a profusion of hat factories (including the Tioronda Hat Works, located in the brick building adjacent to the park), which earned Beacon the nickname "New York's Hat-Making Capital."

Fishkill Marsh supports a variety of wildlife. It furnishes a home for amphibians and aquatic mammals, including muskrats; serves as a hunting ground for ospreys, bald eagles and other raptors; and is a stopover for migratory birds. A boardwalk and observation platforms afford up-close discoveries of these and other creatures. A waterfall at the park's eastern end is impressive in spring or after heavy rains.

== See also ==
- List of Registered Historic Places in Dutchess County, New York
- Fishkill Creek
