= Hendrick Hendricksen Kip =

Dutch magistrate

Hendrick Hendricksen Kip (1600–1685) was a Dutch colonial magistrate. He was one of the nine original popular assemblymen serving in New Amsterdam from 1647 under Pieter Stuyvesant, Governor of New Netherlands.

== Biography ==
Coat of Arms of Hendrick Hendricksen Kip

Hendrick Hendricksen Kip was born in1600 in the town of Niewenhuys in the Netherlands. He worked as a tailor in Amsterdam and married 25-year old Tryntie Lubberts, an orphan from Zwolle, in 1624.

He came to America about 1637 with his wife and five children, as on the map of New Netherlands of 1639 he is recorded as owning one of the Plantations.

In 1647 he was chosen as one of the first Board of "Nine Men" to act as Governing Tribunal for New Amsterdam, and held office again in 1649 and 1650. He was appointed a Grand Schepen (alderman, or magistrate) on Feb. 2, 1656, and on April 11, 1657 he was admitted to the Rights of a Great Burgher, and so took an important part in the government of New Amsterdam. After New Amsterdam was surrendered, he took the Oath of Allegiance to the English in October 1664.

His will (found in the Kip Family papers, New York Public Library) apparently was never officially recorded. It was drawn by notary Willem Bogardus. Since both will and accounting cite the notary, it seems likely that Bogardus, who was city treasurer 1680-85 and later postmaster of New York province, entrusted the papers to Hendrick's son Jacob, especially since Jacob, who served five terms as city schepen, aided in administering the estate. His 7800 guilder estate was a substantial one for that time period. Will dated Feb. 2, 1671; Codicil dated Aug. 4, 1680; Estate accounting March 8, 1686.

== Sons ==
Kip had six children, notably:

- Isaac Hendricksen Kip (1627–1678)
  - Descendants settled in Rhinebeck, New York.
- Jacobus Hendricksen Kip (1631–1690)
  - Married Henrica Vanplanck, widow of Guilian Vanplanck; was a partner with Francis Rombouts and Stephanus Van Cortlandt in the Rombout Patent in Dutchess County, New York. Descendants settled in Kip's Bay, Manhattan, and Westchester County, New York.
- Hendrick Hendricksen Kip, Jr (1633–1670)
  - Settled at New Amstel on the Delaware River and then at Midwout, Midwood (Flatbush), Long Island.

== Legacy ==
- Isaac Hendricksen Kip had a son, Jacobus. In 1685 King James II of England issued a royal grant known today as the Rombout Patent for some 85,000 acres (340 km^{2}) of land Francis Rombouts, Stephanus Van Cortlandt (both former mayors of New York City) and Gulian Verplanck purchased from Wappinger Indians on the east bank of the Hudson River in what is today's southern Dutchess County, New York. However, Verplanck died in 1684 and his widow Henrika married Jacobus Kip, and the family's share of the patent passed down through that line.
- Hendrick Hendricksen Kip is mentioned in Washington Irving's 1809 satirical history The Knickerbocker's History of New York in the following (ahistorical) anecdote.
  [A group of Dutch settlers were sailing down the East River in a small boat:] "While the voyagers were looking around them, on what they conceived to be a serene and sunny lake, they beheld at a distance a crew of painted savages busily employed in fishing, who seemed more like the genii of this romantic region -- their slender canoe lightly balanced like a feather on the undulating surface of the bay. At sight of these, the hearts of the heroes on Communipaw were not a little troubled. But as good fortune would have it, at the bow of the commodore's boat was stationed a very valiant man named Hendrick Kip (which, being interpreted, means chicken; a name given him on token of his courage). No sooner did he behold those varlet heathens than he trembled with excessive valor, and, although a good half mile distant, he seized a musketoon that lay at hand, and turning away his head, fired it most intrepidly in the face of the blessed sun. The blundering weapon recoiled and gave the valiant Kip an ignominious kick that laid him prostrate with uplifted heels in the bottom of the boat. But such was the effect of this tremendous fire that the wild men of the woods, struck with consternation, seized hastily upon their paddles, and shot away into one of the deep inlets of the Long Island shore. This signal victory gave new spirits to the hardy voyagers, and in honor of the achievement they gave the name of the valiant Kip to the surrounding bay, and it has continued to be called "Kip's Bay" from that time to the present."
- He is mentioned among other contemporary historical figures such as Peter Stuyvesant and Adriaen van der Donck in Edmund Clarence Stedman's 1897 poem "The Dutch Patrol" as "Hendrick Kip of the haughty lip".
- Kip's Bay on midtown Manhattan's East Side is named for his son, Hendricksen Kip, who established a house and farm there in 1655.
