= Catheryna Rombout Brett =

American landowner

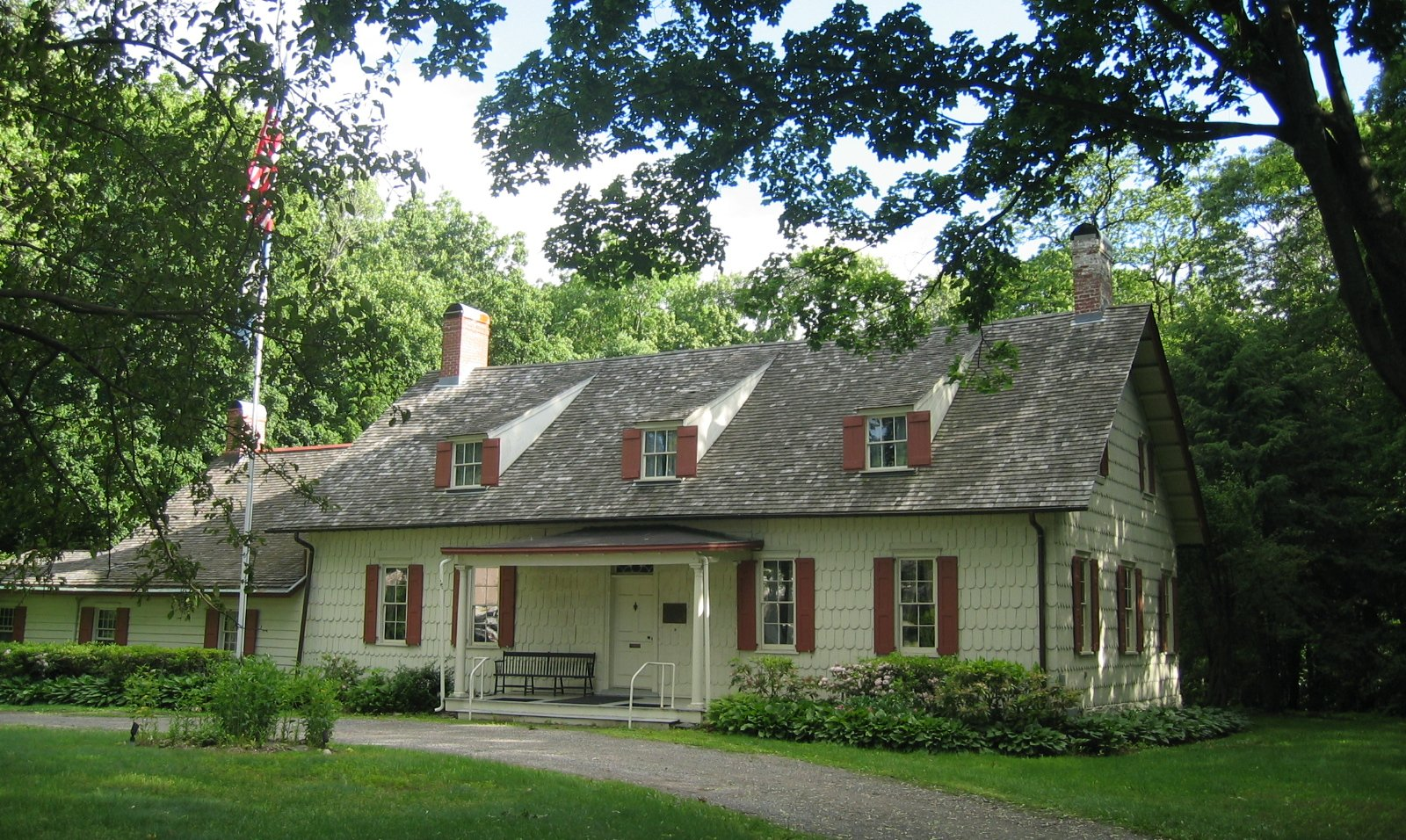
The Madam Brett Homestead, built 1709, in Beacon, New York

Catheryna Rombout Brett (1687–1764) (also Catherina, Catherine, and Catharyna) was the daughter of 12th New York City mayor and land baron Francis Rombouts and Helena Teller Bogardus Van Ball. She inherited a one-third interest in the sprawling Rombout Patent in today's southern Dutchess County, New York, at just four years old. At 16 she married a formal British naval lieutenant, Roger Brett, and the two relocated afterwards from the family home in New York City to their land upstate, reportedly the first permanent White settlers there.

Widowed at 31, Catheryna went on to manage her own affairs and her nearly 30,000-acre estate, unusual in that day and the more so on a frontier. Unlike the families that held the remaining two-thirds of the Rombout Patent, the van Cortlands and Verplanck/Kips, Catheryna not only rented but sold off parcels of her land over the years.

She hosted Daniel Ninham, the last sachem of the Wappinger. Catheryna is credited with teaching him English, which enabled him to argue for Wappinger land rights before the royal Lords of Trade of Great Britain, and allowing him to stay at his pleasure on ancestral lands on her estate in today's hamlet of Wiccopee.

Her legacy is memorialized at the Madam Brett Homestead she and Roger built in today's Beacon, New York.

== Early years ==
Francis Rombouts was born in Hasselt in the Prince-Bishopric of Liège (in today's Belgium) and emigrated to New Amsterdam in 1653. He served as a lieutenant during Director-General Stuyvesant’s expedition against New Sweden. Catheryna's mother, Helena Teller (Bogardus Van Bael Rombout) was the daughter of William Teller, of Albany, one of the original patent holders of the area around Schenectady. Catheryna was born in New York City, and baptized 25 May 1687.

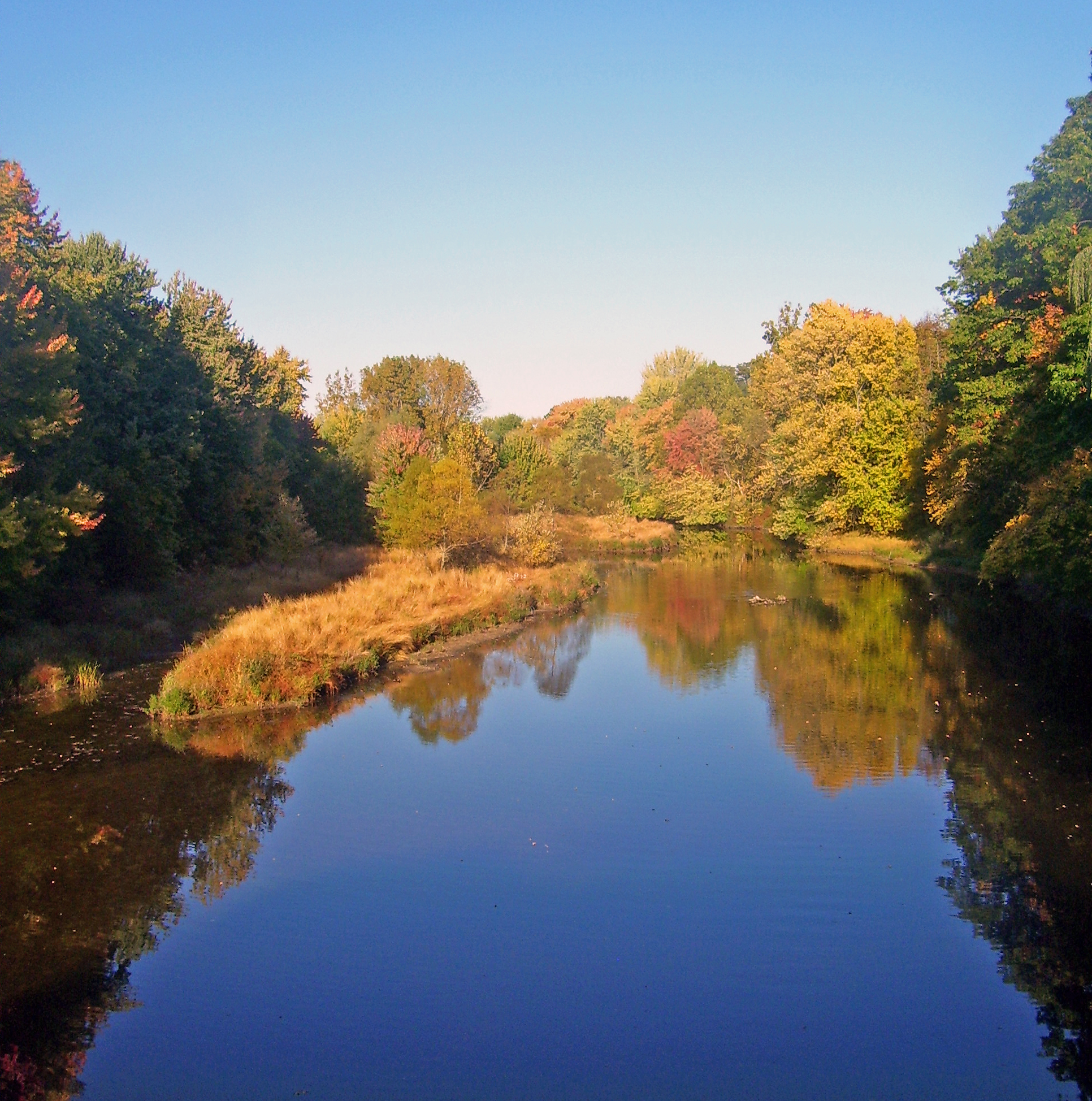
Fishkill Creek fell within Brett's nearly 30,000 acres of the Rombout Patent

== Rombout Patent ==
In partnership with Gulyne Verplank, Francis Rombout became a successful merchant-fur trader, and in 1679, mayor of New York City (following Great Britain's takeover of the former New Amsterdam). In 1683, Rombout, Verplanck, and wealthy fellow former New York City mayor Stephanus Van Cortlandt purchased a sprawling 85,000-acre tract from the Wappinger. The transaction was confirmed by royal grant of King James II on 17 October 1685 and is today known as the Rombout Patent.

Between the purchase and the patent Verplanck died and his widow Henrica married Jacobus Kip. The original document is on display at the Madam Brett Homestead in Beacon, New York. Francis Rombout died in 1691 leaving his estate to four year-old Catheryna, daughter of his third wife and only surviving heir.

== Marriage ==
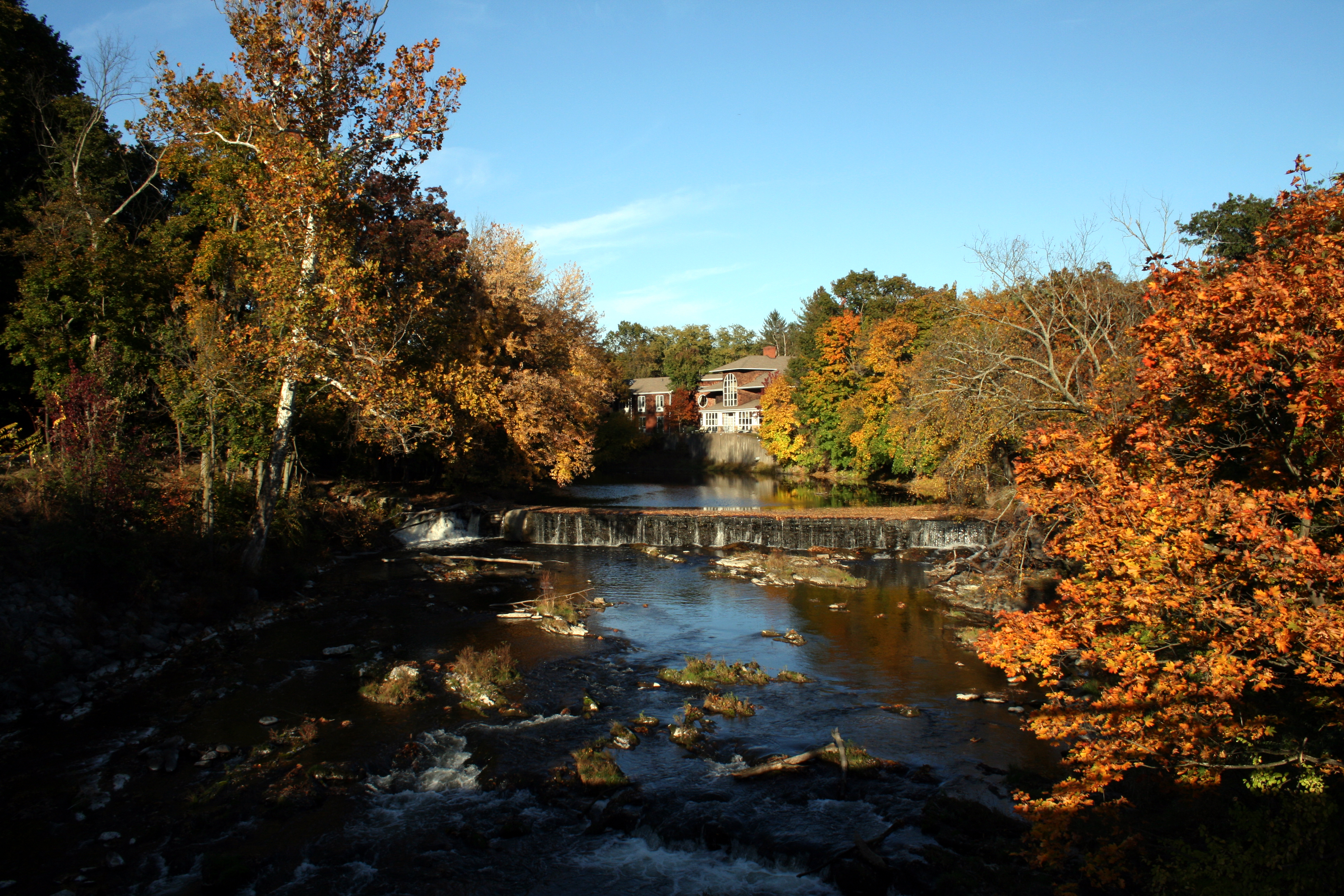
Wappinger Creek, looking north at Red Oaks Mills

In November 1703 sixteen-year-old Catheryna Rombout married Roger Brett, who had arrived in the New World with Lord Cornbury, Governor of the Province of New York. Brett was a well-respected lieutenant in the British Royal Navy. After their marriage, the Bretts moved into the Rombout family home in New York City, which consisted of a large house and spacious grounds on lower Broadway, not far from the present site of Trinity Church. Roger Brett was a vestryman at Trinity from 1703 to 1706.

About 1708 the Rombout Patent was partitioned, with the Van Cortlandts being allotted substantially all the land lying along both banks of Wappinger Creek; the middle portion to the heirs of Gulian Verplanck, and the lower part along the Fish Kill, some 28,000 acres, to the Brett's.

== Widow Brett ==
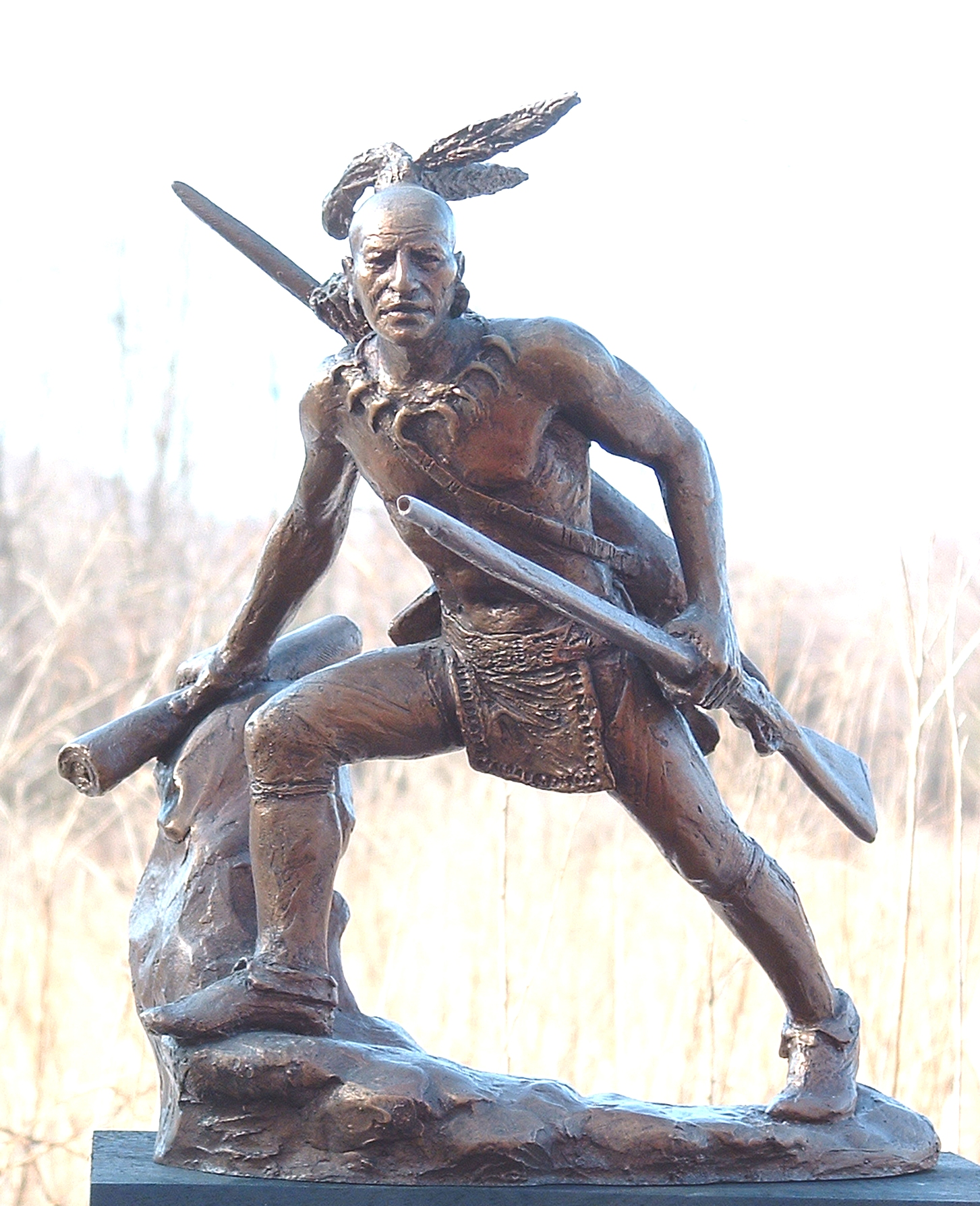
Daniel Nimham, last sachem of the Wappinger people

In June 1718, Roger Brett drowned when his sloop encountered a fierce squall near Fishkill Landing (today's Beacon) while returning from New York City with supplies. Thereafter, Catheryna managed her holdings, becoming a well-respected businesswoman. She is credited both with teaching Daniel Ninham, the last sachem of the Wappinger Indians, English to enable him to press his tribe's land claims in royal courts in Great Britain, and to stay at his pleasure on ancestral lands on her estate in what is today's hamlet of Wiccopee, New York.

Catheryna Brett died in 1764.

She was an ancestress of American writer Bret Harte through his grandmother, Catherine Brett Jackson Hart.

== Madam Brett Homestead ==
The Madam Brett Homestead is an early 18th-century home located in the city of Beacon, New York. It is the oldest building in its part of Dutchess County, and has been listed in the National Register of Historic Places since 1976. It is also listed on the New York State Independence Trail.
