= Great Nine Partners Patent =

Land grant in the Province of New York

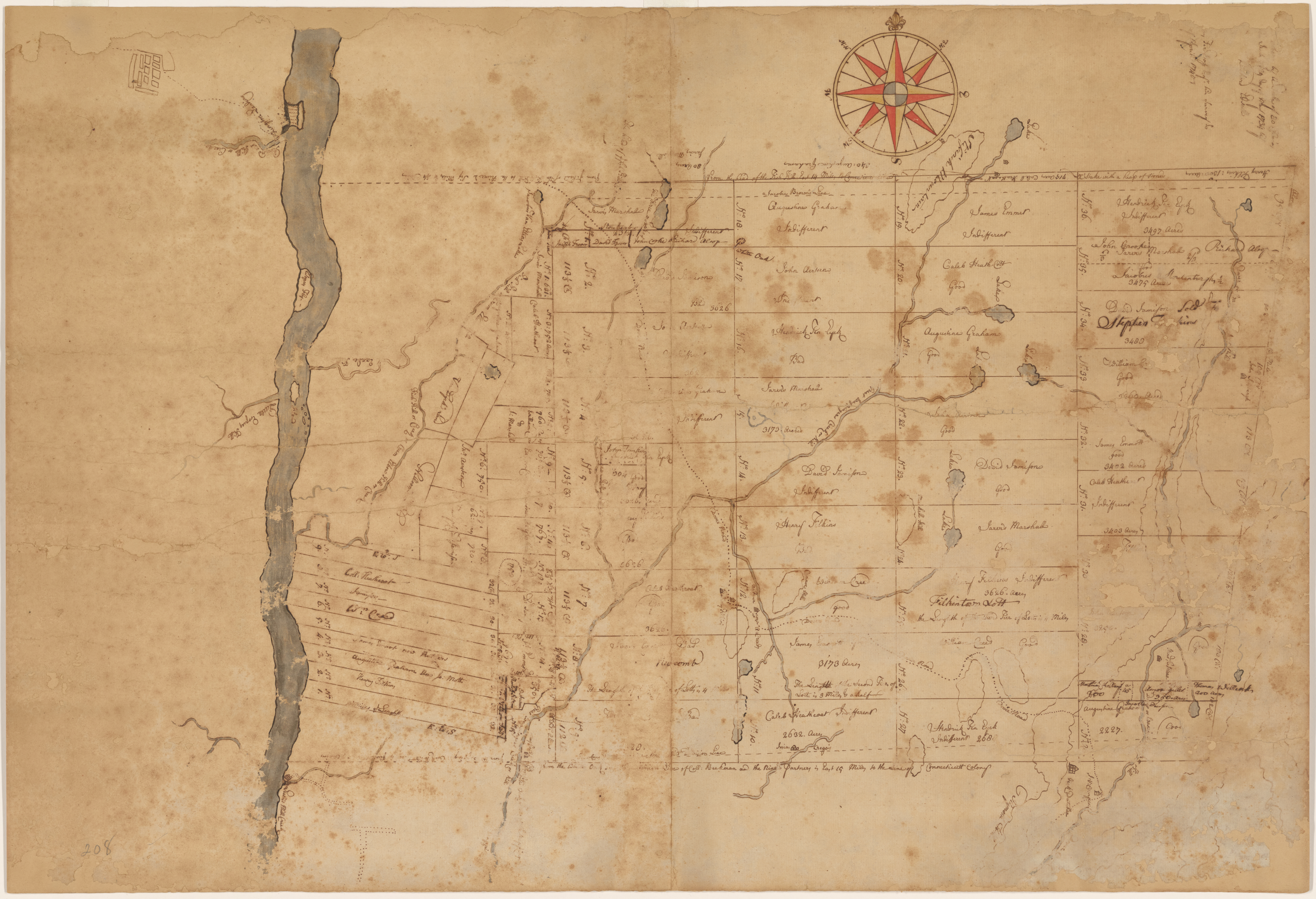
The Great Nine Partners Patent spanned from the Hudson River in the west to The Oblong along the Connecticut border in the east, and was largely bounded by the Little Nine Partners Patent to the north and the Beekman Patent to the south

The Great Nine Partners Patent, also known as the "Lower Nine Partners Patent," was a land grant in Dutchess County, New York, made on May 27, 1697, by New York governor Benjamin Fletcher. The parcel included about four miles (6 km) along the Hudson River and was eight to ten miles (13 to 16 km) wide, extending from the Hudson River to the Connecticut border.

It was the ninth of fourteen patents granted between 1685 and 1706 which came to cover the entirety of historic Dutchess County (which until 1812 included today's Putnam County). The first ten, granted between 1685–1697, covered almost all of Hudson River shoreline in the original county, with three - Rombouts, the Great Nine Partners, and Philipse Patents, extending significantly inland. The eleventh, and smallest, Cuyler, 1697, was the first to contain solely inland territory, just in from the Hudson. The twelfth, and next smallest, Fauconnier, in 1703, completed the Hudson River shoreline. The last two, Beekman, 1705, and the Little Nine Partners, 1706, laid claim to the remaining interior lands.

== History ==
The grant followed the Nine Partners' purchase of approximately 145,000 acres (590 km^{2}) of land from the Wappinger "native Indian proprietors" of central Dutchess County: Perpuwas, Sasaragua, Makerin, Memram, Shawanachko, Shawasquo, Tounis (son of Shawasquo), Acgans, Nimham, (Note: An ancestor of Daniel Nimham, the last sachem of the Wappinger.) Ouracgacguis, Tagahams, Seeck, Cocewyn, Mamany, Arye (Seeck's Son), Wappenas, Tintgeme, Ayawatask, Nonnaparee, and Kindtquaw.

Two years later, land bordering the Hudson River comprising approximately 12,500 acres (51 km^{2}) was divided into nine "Water Lotts". No further divisions of the land were made until 1734, when 36 "Second Division Lotts" were laid out, comprising approximately 120,000 acres (490 km^{2}). By 1741, all of the remaining land had been divided.

The Nine Partners company began a written record of their activities in 1730, when the land began to be surveyed, and a book containing minutes for approximately 150 meetings from 1730 through 1749 is held by the Dutchess County Historical Society. Some documentation regarding the Little (Second) Nine Partners Tract is available at the Moravian Archives in Bethlehem, Pennsylvania.

Prior to 1734, there had been little settlement in the area, but it proceeded rapidly thereafter. Settlers came to the area up the Hudson, but also from New England. When the legislature divided Dutchess County into precincts in 1737, the Nine Partners Grant was included in the Crum Elbow Precinct. In 1762, the Crum Elbow Precinct was divided into two new precincts, called the Amenia and Charlotte Precincts. In 1786, Charlotte was divided into Clinton and Washington Precincts. Washington Precinct included the towns presently known as Stanford and Washington. Clinton Precinct included present-day Clinton, Hyde Park and Pleasant Valley. In 1788, the precincts were changed into towns, and in 1793 the town of Stanford was separated from the town of Washington. The town of Clinton was divided into Clinton, Hyde Park and Pleasant Valley in 1821.

=== The Nine Partners ===
- Col. Caleb Heathcote
- Maj. Augustine Graham (son of Speaker James Graham)
- James Emott (or Emmot)
- Lt. Col. Henry Filkin
- David Jamison
- Hendrick Ten Eyck
- John Evertson (also shown as Jan Aarston)
- William Creed
- Jarvis Marshall

== Current towns derived from the patent ==
- Clinton
- Pleasant Valley
- Stanford
- Washington
- Amenia
- Hyde Park (part)
- North East (part)

== See also ==
- Little Nine Partners Patent
- Dutchess County land patents
- Timeline of town creation in the Hudson Valley
