= Little Nine Partners Patent =

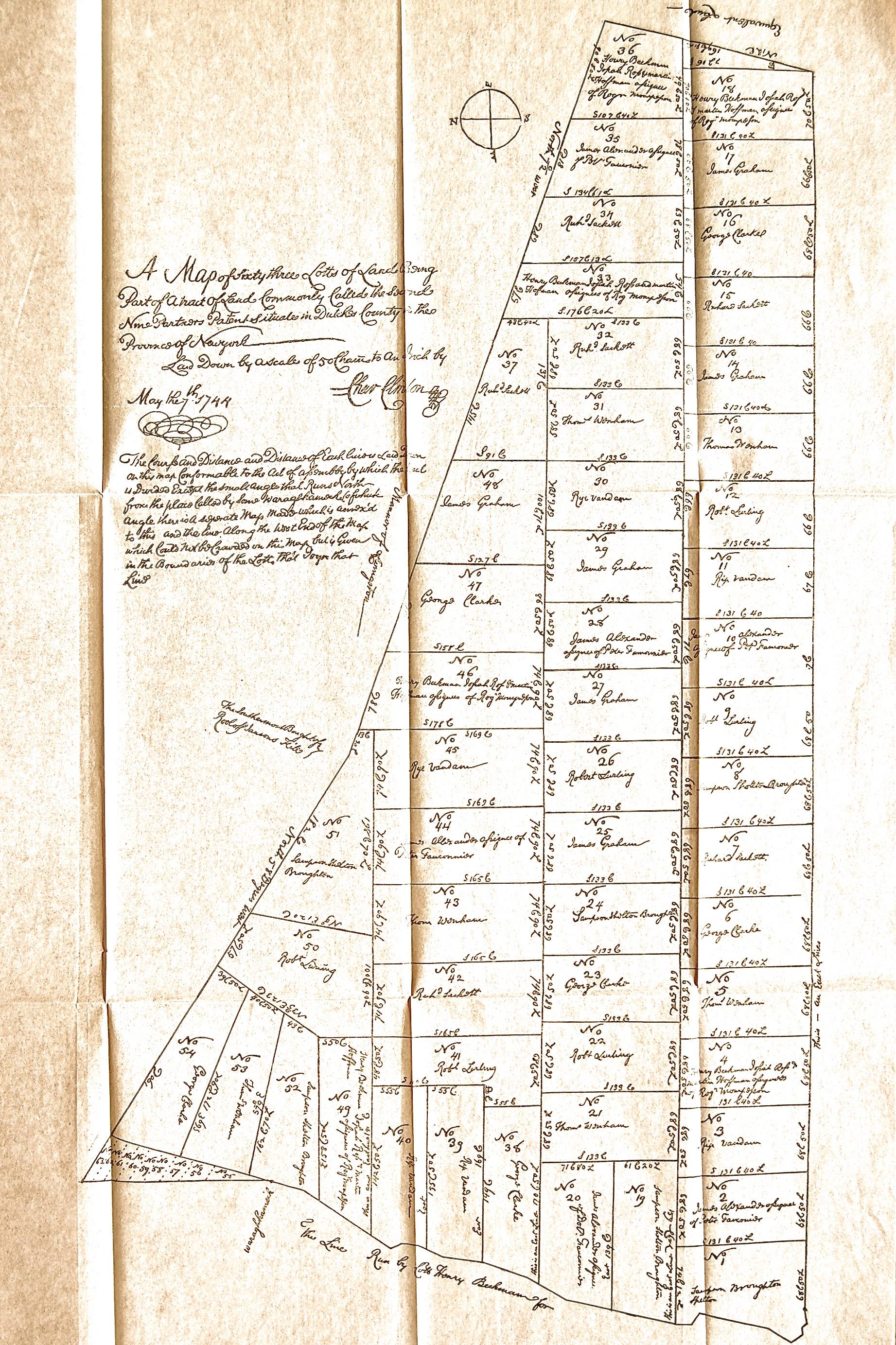
1897 reprint of a 1744 map showing division of the Little Nine Partners Patent in Dutchess County into Lots

Little Nine Partners Patent 1744 Partition Dutchess County

The Little Nine Partners Patent was a land patent granted in 1706 in Dutchess County, New York, United States. It was the last of fourteen patents granted between 1685 and 1706 which came to cover the entirety of historic Dutchess County (which until 1812 included today's Putnam County).

The first ten, granted between 1685 and 1697, covered almost all of Hudson River shoreline in the original county, with three – Rombouts, the Great Nine Partners, and Philipse Patents, extending significantly inland. The eleventh, and smallest, Cuyler, 1697, was the first to contain solely inland territory, just in from the Hudson. The twelfth, and next smallest, Fauconnier, in 1703, completed the Hudson River shoreline. The last two, Beekman, 1705, and the Little Nine Partners, 1706, laid claim to the remaining interior lands.

== History ==
The patent was located in the northern part of the county, and comprises all or parts of the modern towns of Milan, Pine Plains, and North East. Roughly triangular in shape, it was bounded on the north by Columbia County, on the south by the Great Nine Partners Patent (1697) and on the west by the Schuyler (1686) and Rhinebeck (1697) patents. Its eastern boundary was the area known as The Oblong, a narrow strip of land along the eastern edge of Dutchess County, bordering the state of Connecticut.

=== Partners ===
There were eight original patentees of the Little Nine Partners Patent:

- Sampson Broughton
- Rip Van Dam
- Thomas Wenham
- Roger Mompesson
- Peter Fauconier
- Augustine Graham
- Richard Sackett
- Robert Lurting

George Clarke subsequently bought a ninth share, becoming the ninth partner, but not a patentee.

=== Allocation ===
Although awarded in 1706, it was not until 1744 that the allocation of each of the nine partners was associated with a specific lot through a Dutchess County Court process that involved a lottery system, drawn by "two boys...under the age of sixteen."

== See also ==
- Great Nine Partners Patent
- Rombout Patent
- Dutchess County land patents
- Philipse Patent
