= Francis Rombouts =

Mayor of New York City from 1679 to 1680

13th Mayor of New York City
- In office 1679–1680
- Preceded by: Thomas Delavall
- Succeeded by: William Dyre

Personal details
- Born: June 22, 1631 Hasselt, Prince-Bishopric of Liège
- Died: 1691 (aged 59–60)
- Children: Catheryna Brett

Francis Rombouts (22 June 1631 – 1691) was the 13th Mayor of New York City from 1679 to 1680. He was one of three proprietors of the Rombout Patent, and the father of the pioneering Colonial businesswoman Catheryna Rombout Brett.

== Biography ==
Frans Rombout was born on June 22 at 1631 in Hasselt, Belgium, the second son of Jan and Johanna Haenen Rombout. His father was a tax receiver for the Archdeacon of Liège.

Francis Rombout emigrated to New Amsterdam in 1653 aboard the ship Nieuw Amsterdam. He engaged in trade as a merchant while yet a youth. In the year 1658, he enrolled himself among the burghers, though he had been for several years previously a trader there. His trading operations as a merchant were tolerably extensive, though he did not rank among the wealthiest of the inhabitants. He was probably worth, as near as can be estimated, about ten thousand dollars, which was then, however, considered an independent fortune.

In 1671, Rombout bought his first house at Nieuw-Amsterdam from Captain Paulus Leenderzen Vandiegrist. A fine stone house with a garden and orchard, it was the next house north of the church-yard, and about midway between Morris and Rector streets, on the west side of the Heerestraat. The property extended in the back to the North River shore.

Rombout held several offices of trust among his fellow-citizens. In 1673, 1674, 1676, 1678, 1686, he was an Alderman. Afterward, in 1687, the city having been divided into wards, he was returned as Alderman of the West Ward. He afterward held the office of Justice of the Peace, until his death. His political principles were of a liberal character, and his manners and address grave and dignified. At the time of his mayoralty, the city contained about 3,500 inhabitants. Rombouts Avenue in the Bronx is named for him.

== Personal life ==
On May 31, 1665, Rombout married Aeltie Wessels in the Reformed Dutch Church of New Amsterdam. She died sometime prior to August 5, 1675, when he then married Anna Elizabeth Masschop. Widowed a second time, he married, on September 8, 1683, Helena Teller Bogardus Van Bael. It was the third marriage for both of them. Helena Teller was born about 1645, the daughter of William and Margaret Doncheson Teller of Schenectady. Helena had seven children from her previous marriages, and from this marriage, another three were born. She and Rombout had two boys and a girl. The boys died young but the girl, Catheryna, born on 5 September 1687, survived. Catheryna later married British Royal Navy lieutenant Roger Brett.

== The Rombout Patent ==
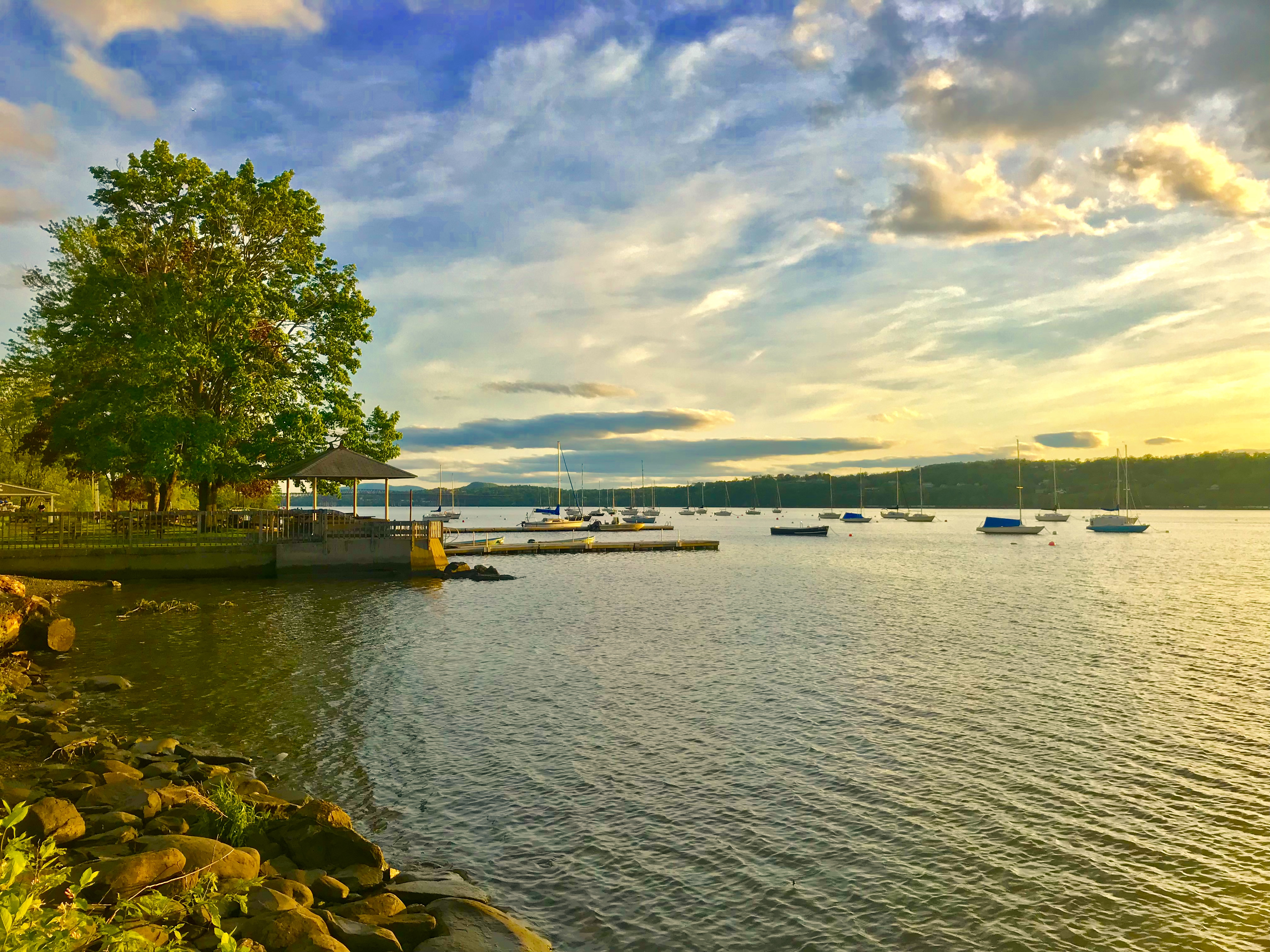
The Hudson River shore of the Rombout Patent in the town of Wappinger, New York

The Rombout Patent was a Colonial era land patent issued by King James II of England in 1685 sanctioning the right of Francis Rombouts and two partners to own some 85,000 acres (340 km^{2}) of land in the southeast of the then Province of New York that had purchased from the Wappinger people. The Patent included most of what is today's southern Dutchess County, New York.

Rombout had gone into the fur-trading business with merchant Gulian Verplanck. They were joined in 1683 by the patroon of Van Cortlandt Manor in Westchester County, Stephanus Van Cortlandt. Before a patent could be issued, Verplanck died, and his widow married Jacobus Kip, to whom the patent was issued.

== See also ==
- Rombouts, the surname
- Mount Gulian
- Great Nine Partners Patent
- Little Nine Partners Patent
- Dutchess County land patents
- Philipse Patent
