= Rombout Patent =

American colonial era land patent

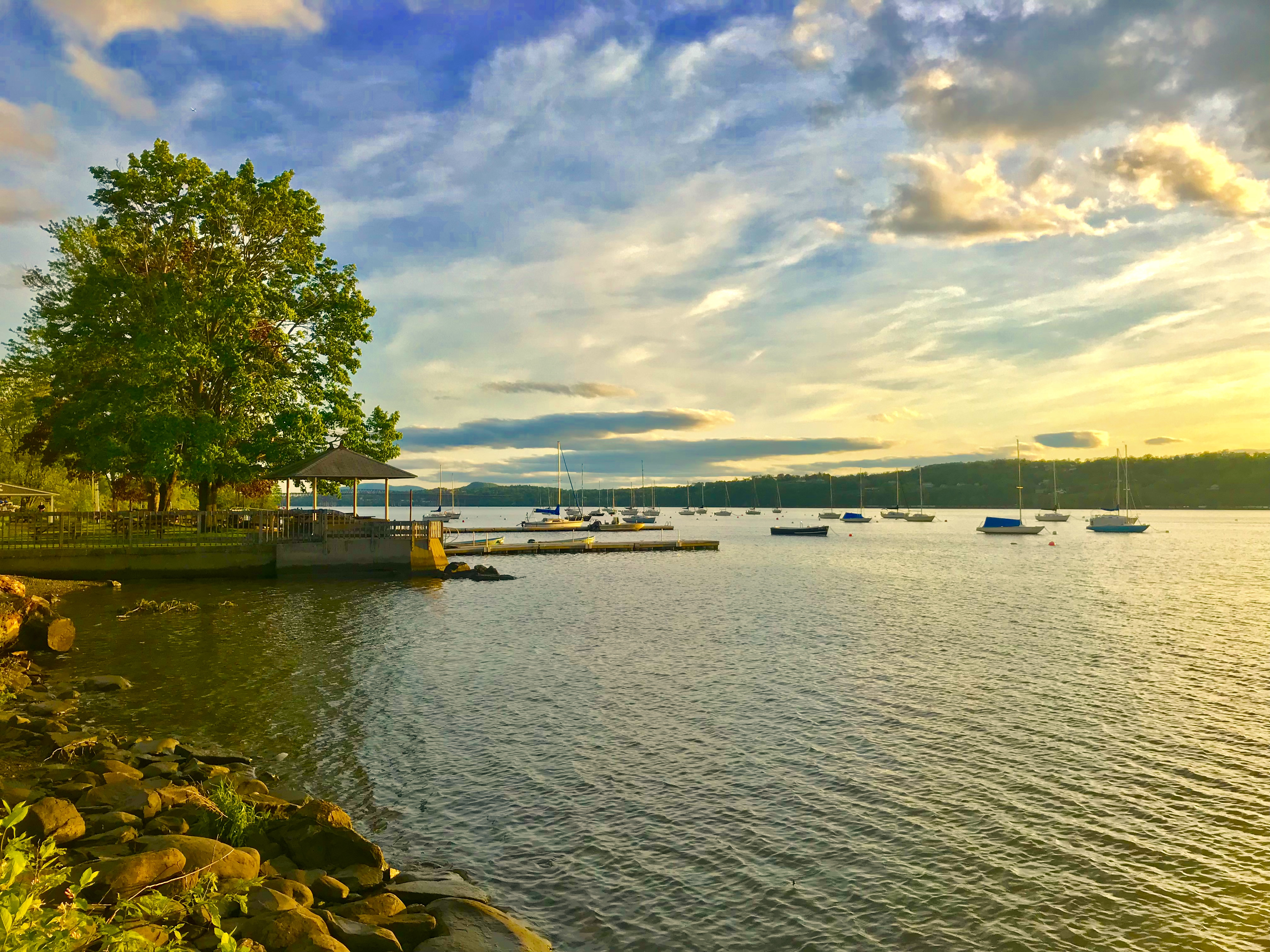
The Hudson River shore of the Rombout Patent in the town of Wappinger, New York

The Rombout Patent was a Colonial era land patent issued by King James II of England in 1685 sanctioning the right of Francis Rombouts and his partners Stephanus Van Cortlandt and Jacobus Kip to own some 85,000 acres (34,000 ha) of land they had purchased from Native Americans. The Patent included most of what is today's southern Dutchess County, New York.

It was the first of fourteen patents granted between 1685 and 1706 which came to cover the entirety of historic Dutchess County (which until 1812 included today's Putnam County). The first eleven, granted between 1685 and 1697, covered every foot of Hudson River shoreline in the original county. The last three, 1703–1706, laid claim to the remaining interior lands.

== History ==
Rombout, a former mayor of New York City, had gone into the fur-trading business with merchant Gulian Verplanck. A license for the pair to purchase an 85,000-acre tract from the Wappinger people was granted by Governor Thomas Dongan, February 8, 1682. They were joined in 1683 by Stephanus Van Cortlandt, the first native-born mayor of New York City and patroon of Van Cortlandt Manor in Westchester County, who offered to put up one-third of the money in return for a one-third interest in the parcel.

The purchase was completed on August 8, 1683, for $1,250 or so in guns, shot, powder, blankets, wampum, alcohol, cloth and other goods, the deed signed by three representatives of the buyers, a Dutch interpreter, and twenty-two Wappinger sachem (who made their marks). Before a patent could be issued to the trio, however, Verplanck died, and his widow Henrica married Jacobus Kip. The patent was granted on October 17, 1685, with the Verplanck interest passing down through the Kip line.

=== Goods traded ===
According to the deed, the following goods were traded for the land:

One hund Royalls, One hund Pound Powder, Two hund fathom of White Wampum, one hund Barrs of Lead, One hundred fathom of Black Wampum, thirty tobacco boxes, ten holl adges, thirty Gunns, twenty Blankets, forty fathom of Duffills, twenty fathom of stroudwater Cloth, thirty Kittles, forty Hatchets, forty Homes, forty Shirts, forty p stockins, twelve coattis of R. B. & b. C, ten Drawing Knives, forty earthen Juggs, forty Bottles, forty Knives, fouer ankers rum, ten halfe fatts Beere, Two hund tobacco Pipes &c., Eighty Pound Tobacco.

== Maps ==
See a period map of the Patent here at the Mount Gulian Historical Site.

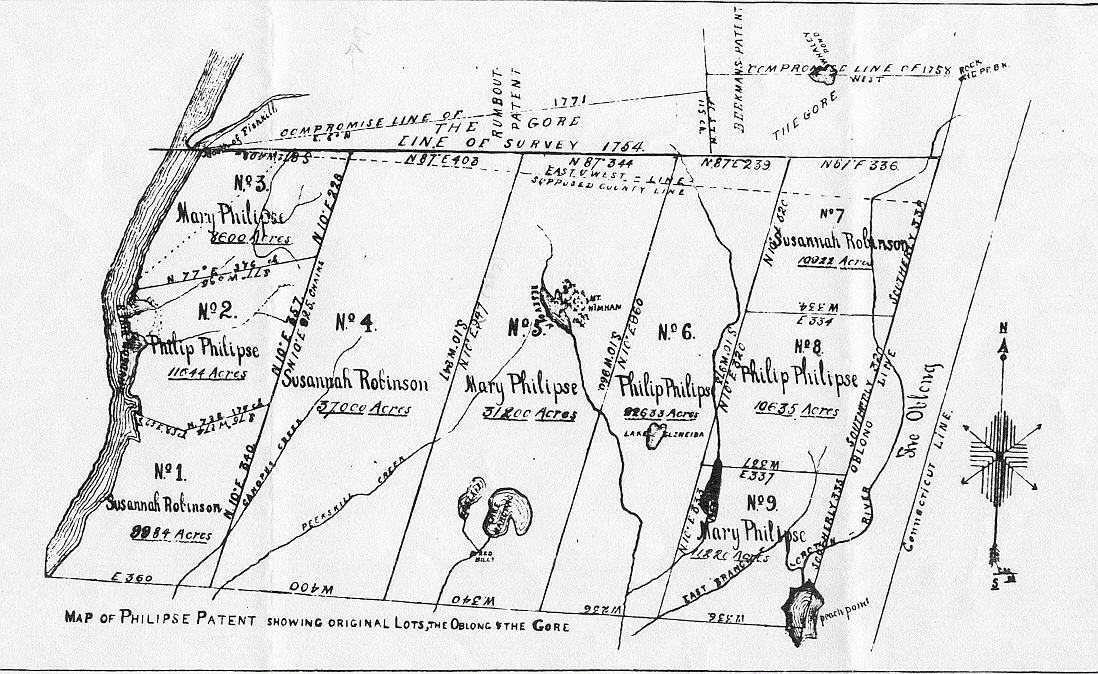
Map of the Philipse Patent showing Rombout Patent directly to the northwest

Draft of the lands disputed by Philipse Patent against Beekmans & Rambaults (1753)

== See also ==
- Great Nine Partners Patent
- Little Nine Partners Patent
- Dutchess County land patents
- Philipse Patent
- Mount Gulian
