= Dwayne Gordon =

American football player (born 1969)

No. 53, 52, 54
- Position: Linebacker

Personal information
- Born: November 2, 1969 (age 57); White Plains, New York, U.S.
- Listed height: 6 ft 1 in (1.85 m)
- Listed weight: 240 lb (109 kg)

Career information
- High school: Arlington (LaGrange, New York)
- College: New Hampshire
- NFL draft: 1993: 8th round, 218th overall pick

Career history
- Miami Dolphins (1993)*; Atlanta Falcons (1993–1994); San Diego Chargers (1995–1996); New York Jets (1997–2000)
- * Offseason or practice squad member only

Career NFL statistics
- Tackles: 247
- Sacks: 3
- Forced fumbles: 2
- Interceptions: 1
- Stats at Pro Football Reference

Dwayne Gordon (born November 2, 1969) is an American former professional football player who was a linebacker in the National Football League (NFL) from 1993 through 2000. He played college football for the New Hampshire Wildcats and was selected in the eighth round of the 1993 NFL draft by the Miami Dolphins. He played college football at the University of New Hampshire.
