= Noxon =

Noxon may refer to any one of the following:

== Places ==
- Noxon, Montana
- Noxon House, New York

== People ==
- Bill Noxon (1929–2016), American football coach
- Christopher Noxon (born 1968), American writer and journalist
- James Noxon (1818–1881), New York lawyer and politician
- Marti Noxon (born 1965), American television and film writer
- Nicolas Noxon (1936–2016), American documentary filmmaker
