= Arlington Central School District =

School district in New York State, U.S.

Location
- 144 Todd Hill Rd., LaGrangeville, New York 12540 Dutchess County, New York United States
- Coordinates: 41.6556°N 73.7774°W

District information
- Type: Public
- Grades: K-12
- Established: 1924; 101 years ago
- Superintendent: Lorenzo Licopoli (July 2020-June 2021); David Moyer (July 2021-January 2024); Philip Benante (2024-present)
- Schools: 13
- Budget: $208 million (2015-2016)
- NCES District ID: 3603270

Students and staff
- Students: 8,324 (2017-2018)
- Teachers: 622.77 (2017-2018)
- Staff: 1557.28 (2017-2018)
- Student–teacher ratio: 13.37 (2017-2018)

Other information
- Website: www.arlingtonschools.org

The Arlington Central School District (abbreviated ACSD) is one of thirteen public school districts serving residents of Dutchess County, New York. The district was created in 1924.

== Organization ==
=== Coverage area ===
The district's territory covers substantial parts of the towns of: Beekman, La Grange, Pleasant Valley, Poughkeepsie, and Union Vale. The district also includes small parts of the following towns: East Fishkill, Hyde Park, Pawling, and Wappinger.

Census-designated places (hamlets) within this district include Arlington, Freedom Plains, MacDonnell Heights, Pleasant Valley, Titusville, and Vassar College, as well as portions of Red Oaks Mill. Vassar maintains an apartment complex for faculty, which may house school-age dependents.

=== Enrollment ===
As of 2011, ACSD had 9,724 students. In the 2009–2010 school year one elementary school, LaGrange, was shut down, its last day being on June 23, 2010. Its building was converted into office space for the district. Arlington Middle School was removed on June 20, 2014, and its building was converted into Arthur S. May Elementary School four days later. The previous Arthur S. May building from 1925 was closed on the latter date, and was repurposed into The Lofts at the School in late March 2023. Both structures had served as a high school for the district in the past.

== Schools ==
=== Elementary ===
- Beekman Elementary School
- Vail Farm Elementary School
- Noxon Road Elementary School
- Titusville Intermediate School
- Overlook Primary School
- Arthur S. May Elementary School
- Joseph D'Aquanni West Road Intermediate School
- Traver Road Primary School

=== Middle ===
school	town	grades	notes
LaGrange Middle School	LaGrange	Grades 6-8	Formerly AHS South Campus and constructed in 1966
Union Vale Middle School	Union Vale	Grades 6-8	Constructed in 2004, along with Vail Farm Elementary School

=== High ===
- Arlington High School

=== Other ===
- Dutchess County BOCES
