= Freedom Plains, New York =

Census-designated place in New York, United States

- Census-designated place
- Location of Freedom Plains, New York
- Coordinates: 41°40′21″N 73°47′58″W
- Country: United States
- State: New York
- County: Dutchess
- Town: LaGrange

Area
  - Total: 1.34 sq mi (3.46 km^{2})
  - Land: 1.29 sq mi (3.34 km^{2})
  - Water: 0.042 sq mi (0.11 km^{2})
- Elevation: 315 ft (96 m)

Population (2020)
  - Total: 438
  - Density: 339.4/sq mi (131.04/km^{2})
- Time zone: UTC-5 (Eastern (EST))
  - Summer (DST): UTC-4 (EDT)
- ZIP Codes: 12540 (Lagrangeville); 12569 (Pleasant Valley); 12603 (Poughkeepsie)
- Area code: 845
- FIPS code: 36-27452
- GNIS feature ID: 0950660

Freedom Plains is a hamlet and census-designated place (CDP) in Dutchess County, New York, United States. As of the 2020 census, Freedom Plains had a population of 438.

== Geography ==
Freedom Plains is in the center of the town of LaGrange, in the south-central part of Dutchess County. New York State Route 55 passes through the hamlet, leading west 7 miles (11 km) to Poughkeepsie, the county seat, and southeast 13 miles (21 km) to Pawling. The Taconic State Parkway forms the eastern edge of Freedom Plains, leading north 57 miles (92 km) to its end at Interstate 90 and south 70 miles (110 km) to New York City. The CDP is bordered to the north by James Baird State Park.

According to the U.S. Census Bureau, the Freedom Plains CDP has a total area of 1.33 square miles (3.45 km^{2}), of which 1.29 square miles (3.34 km^{2}) is land and 0.042 square miles (0.11 km^{2}), or 3.30%, is water.

== Demographics ==
Historical population
| Census | Pop. | Note | %± |
|---|---|---|---|
| 2020 | 438 | | — |
U.S. Decennial Census

== Education ==
It is in the Arlington Central School District, which operates Arlington High School.
