= MacDonnell Heights, New York =

- Census-designated place
- Location within New York Location within the United States
- Coordinates: 41°42′57″N 73°51′33″W
- Country: United States
- State: New York
- County: Dutchess
- Town: Poughkeepsie

Area
  - Total: 0.63 sq mi (1.63 km^{2})
  - Land: 0.63 sq mi (1.63 km^{2})
  - Water: 0 sq mi (0.00 km^{2})
- Elevation: 200 ft (61 m)

Population (2020)
  - Total: 1,291
  - Density: 2,056.1/sq mi (793.85/km^{2})
- Time zone: UTC-5 (Eastern (EST))
  - Summer (DST): UTC-4 (EDT)
- ZIP Code: 12603 (Poughkeepsie)
- Area code: 845
- FIPS code: 36-44105
- GNIS feature ID: 2806927

MacDonnell Heights is a census-designated place (CDP) in the town of Poughkeepsie in Dutchess County, New York, United States. As of the 2020 census, MacDonnell Heights had a population of 1,291. It was first listed as a CDP prior to the 2020 census.

The community is in western Dutchess County, in the northeastern section of the town of Poughkeepsie. It is bordered to the southeast by Wappinger Creek, across which is the town of LaGrange. The CDP includes the hamlets of MacDonnell Heights and Colonial Heights. U.S. Route 44 (Dutchess Turnpike) passes through the center of the CDP, leading west 4 miles (6 km) to the center of Poughkeepsie and northeast 21 miles (34 km) to Amenia .

== Demographics ==
Historical population
Census	Pop.	Note	%±
2020	1,291		—
U.S. Decennial Census

== Education ==
It is in the Arlington Central School District, which operates Arlington High School.
