= Murphy Grist Mill =

- U.S. National Register of Historic Places
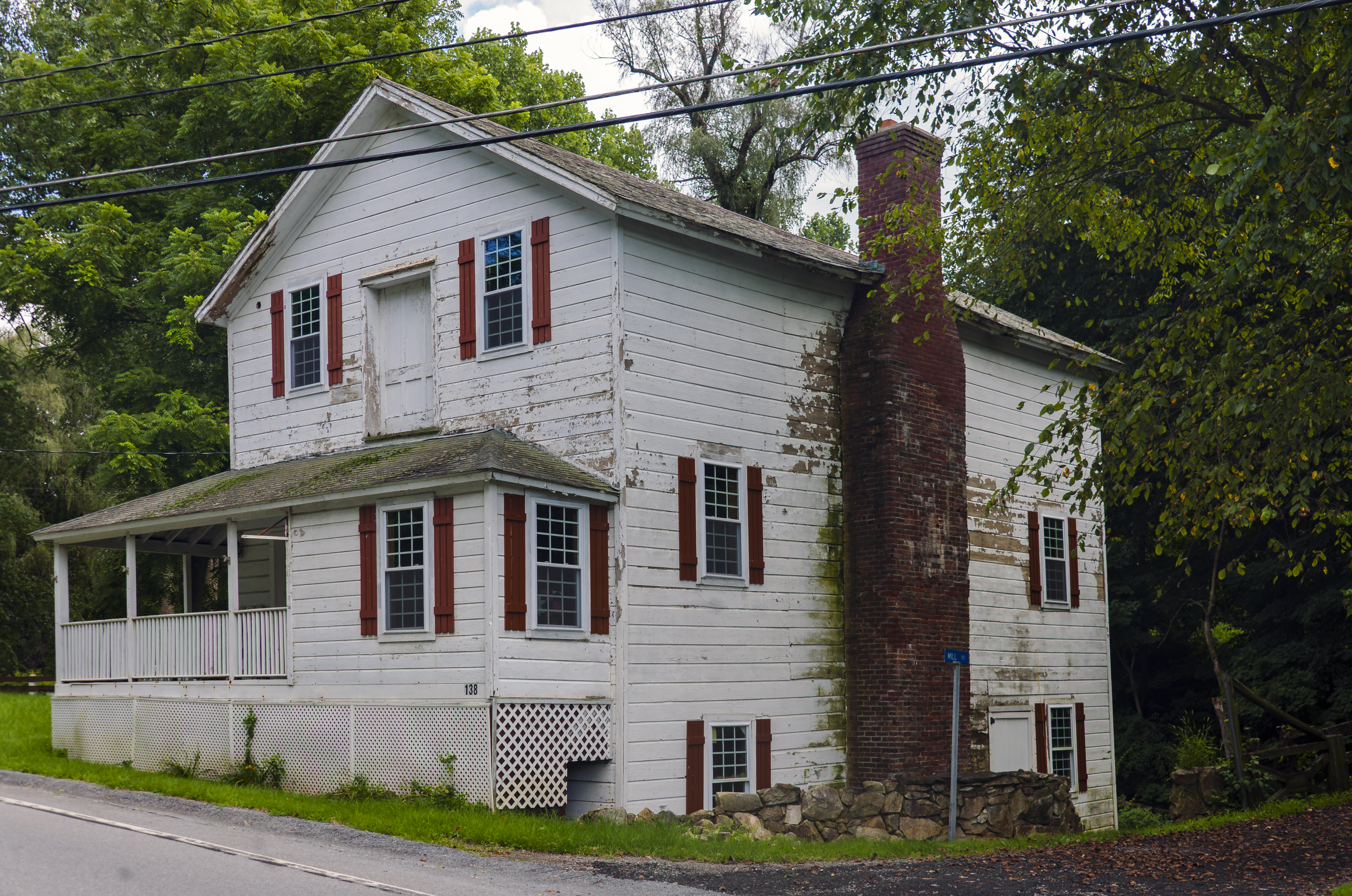
- North elevation and west profile, 2018

- Location within New York Location within the United States
- Location: 138 Beekman Poughquag Rd., Poughquag, New York
- Coordinates: 41°36′39″N 73°42′09″W
- Area: 0.62 acres (0.25 ha)
- Built: 1889
- NRHP reference No.: 15000230
- Added to NRHP: May 18, 2015

Murphy Grist Mill, also known as the Old Mill, is a historic grist mill located at Poughquag, Dutchess County, New York. It was built in 1889, and is a two-story, front-gabled, vernacular frame building with a stone and concrete foundation. It has a one-story, hipped roof porch supported by simple contemporary posts. Also on the property are the contributing ruins of a stone mill dam. During his 1909 campaign for New York State Senate, Franklin Delano Roosevelt gave a political speech from the porch of the mill building. The mill remained in use until about 1940. Franklin Delano Roosevelt Jr. purchased the property in 1949 and the mill was used primarily for storage. During the mid-1980s, it was given to the Town of Beekman and restoration began in 2014.

It was added to the National Register of Historic Places in 2015 by local non-profit Youth for Restoration.
