= Arlington High School (New York) =

Location
- 1157 Route 55; Lagrange, New York 12540; United States; 41°40′27″N 73°47′47″W

Information
- Type: Public High School
- Established: 1924
- School district: Arlington Central School District
- Superintendent: Dave Moyer
- Principal: Don Solimene
- Teaching staff: 171.87 (on an FTE basis)
- Grades: 9–12
- Enrollment: 2,472 (2024–2025)
- Student to teacher ratio: 14.38
- Campus: Suburban
- Colors: Maroon and gold
- Athletics: Section 1 (NYSPHSAA)
- Mascot: Admiral Al
- Nickname: Admirals
- Newspaper: The Arlingtonian
- Website: School website

Arlington High School is a public high school in the Arlington Central School District located in LaGrange, New York, United States, on Route 55. It was established in the early 1900s, and was granted the charter for a six-years school in 1926. Today, it is intended for students in grades 9–12, as part of the Arlington Central School District. It is one of the largest high schools in the state of NY and is attend by 3,000 students.

== History ==
The school, although not the current building, has its origins in the early years of the Arlington Union Free School District Number 7, the district's name from 1900 to 1961. When the district was formed, there were only two school buildings. In 1900, only one year of high school work was offered. In 1922, it was expanded to two years; and in 1924, three years were offered. In 1926, Arlington High School was granted a charter as a six-year high school. Its first commencement was held in that year, with only nine students graduating. Since then, there has been an obvious increase in the school's population, almost a total of 4,000 students (2019–2020).

== Attendance boundary ==
The district's territory (of which, Arlington High is the sole comprehensive high school) covers substantial parts of the towns of: Beekman, LaGrange, Pleasant Valley, Poughkeepsie, and Union Vale. The district also includes small parts of the following towns: East Fishkill, Hyde Park, Pawling, and Wappinger.

Census-designated places (hamlets) within this district include Arlington, Freedom Plains, MacDonnell Heights, Pleasant Valley, Titusville, and Vassar College, as well as portions of Red Oaks Mill. Vassar maintains an apartment complex for faculty, which opened in 2023.

== Student life ==
=== The Arlingtonian ===
The Arlingtonian is the official school newspaper. The paper is entirely student-run, although it is faculty-advised. Although the paper focuses on school events and news, it also includes local news and information regarding fund-raising events. The Arlingtonian publishes bi-monthly while school is in session. The newspaper is distributed free to all students, as well as local stores. A home delivery option is also available.

=== Marist/Arlington Bridge program ===
Arlington offers senior students the option to fulfill their high-school graduation requirements while simultaneously completing a full year of college at Marist College in Poughkeepsie. The program permits the student to earn up to 15 credits while fulfilling the basic Regents Prep courses in history and mathematics

=== Senior Follies ===
Senior Follies is an Arlington High School Tradition that dates back to the 1970s. It is a comedy and music show featuring members of the graduating class hosted by Senior Class Student Government. In 2011, the long-standing tradition resurfaced for the first time in six years.

=== Arlington High School Music Department ===
The Arlington High School music department currently supports 5 concert bands, 5 orchestras, 2 choirs, 3 jazz ensembles (with the most competitive being Jazz Machine), a competitive marching band, an indoor color guard, and numerous instrumental and vocal chamber ensembles. The Jazz Machine has attended the prestigious Berklee Jazz Festival in Boston 20 times. Between 2007 and 2017, the Jazz Machine took 1st place 4 times at Berklee and placed in the top 3 virtually every year in Large Ensemble Class 1. The Jazz Machine also participates annually in the Essentially Ellington program. In 2018, the Jazz Machine was named a finalist and placed 2nd at the Mid-Atlantic Jazz Festival and returned to the MAJF in 2019 to once again be named a finalist and took 1st place as well. In October 2019, for the fourth year in a row, the Arlington Admirals High School Marching Band brought home the first-place trophy, or Governor's Cup, in the National Class from the New York State Field Band Conference Championship, held annually in Syracuse.

== Campus ==
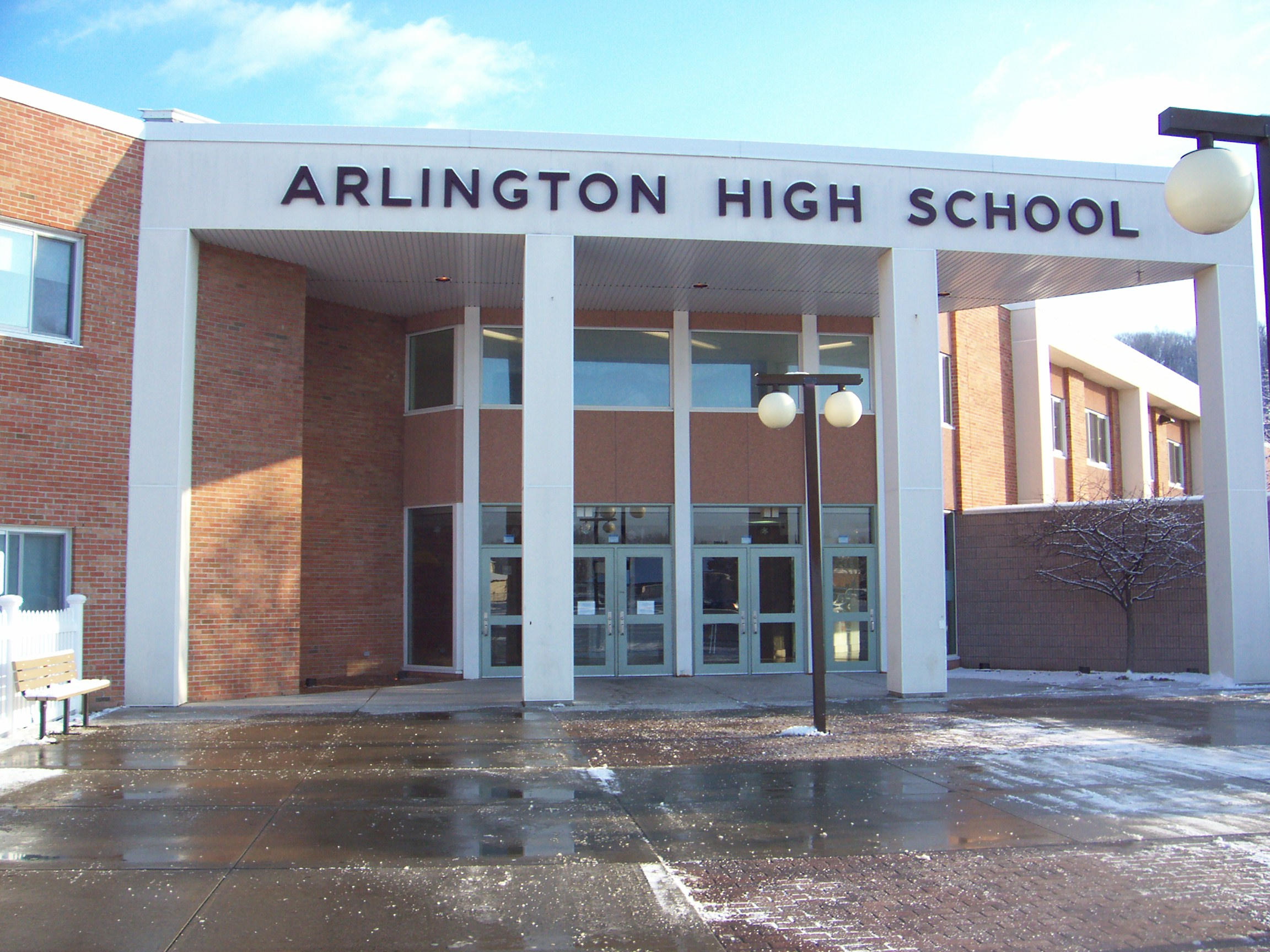
Front of the school

The original building constructed specifically to house Arlington High School was built on Raymond Avenue in Poughkeepsie. It later went on to be used as the Arthur S. May Elementary School, and most recently (2014) it was purchased by nearby Vassar College. The second high school was built in 1933 and went on to become the Arlington Middle School. That building is now the current location of the Arthur S. May Elementary School, which moved into the building in 2014. The current Arlington High School building, originally constructed in 1961, has been significantly expanded several times, most recently in 2009. The newly expanded high school includes a main lobby, where the "Bubble" is located. Adjacent to the main lobby are the main office, the "Main Annex" and a New York State Police office. Attached to this are two long hallways running in opposite directions, which house more offices and classrooms. At the end of one of the hallways are the Gyms (Gyms 5, 6, 7), as well as the Athletic Department office. At the end of the other hallway, on the opposite end of the school, is the Large Group Instruction Room, Cafeterias C and D, and the Admiral Cafe, a student-run restaurant that operates during school hours. The original facility was built on a 100-acre (40 ha) site by UW Marx to support a maximum of 4,000 students. The school has a net building area of 533,000 sq ft (49,500 m^{2}) and a cost of $64,229,000.

The current Arlington High School campus was first constructed in 1961, when the former high school, a 1930s-era WPA building in the Arlington area of Poughkeepsie, was converted into a middle school. In 1967, the first of several renovations took place, adding dozens of new classrooms to the building and raising building capacity to 1,500 students. In 1979, the current high school became "North Campus" for juniors, seniors and a portion of the sophomore class, while the former LaGrange Junior High School, located a short distance away on Stringham Road in Lagrangeville, was re-designated "South Campus" and housed freshman and the rest of the sophomore class. Some sophomore students split their days between the two campuses, and school buses came in both a "first wave" and a "second wave" to serve both campuses. Another renovation was completed at the high school in the autumn of 1998 that nearly tripled its size, enabling all four grades to be moved back to what had been the North Campus. With the reconsolidation of the high school onto one campus, the Stringham Road building became LaGrange Middle School.

Because the 1998 expansion was meant to address the district's requirements for only 10 years, discussion began in 2005 on an additional, large expansion of the building. Debate over the expansion was tense, due to the perception of already lofty school-tax rates and the looming energy crisis. Nevertheless, district voters approved the measure, though with several budget-trimming alterations. As a result, the school expanded again, with the new renovation completed by 2009. It is large enough to hold more than 4,000 students.

=== Expansion ===
In 2006, voters in the district approved a plan to expand the campus further. The expansion includes 40 new classrooms, a K-12 education center, a new TV studio, a radio station as well as new science labs, a new auditorium, and a cafeteria for seniors. The expansion was added onto the school's south end of the 1100s and encompasses the previous senior parking lot. New parking lots on the east side of the building will offset the loss of parking arising from the expansion. As of December 2010, the old music office has been transformed into a senior lounge, although rather bare. The William J. Sweeney Performance Hall has opened and was first used for the Admiral Players' production The Wedding Singer and the 2010 Winter Concert Series.

=== House plan ===
In 2006, the school began "The House Plan". The plan gave each grade its own office, with four guidance counselors, two administrators and advisers. The 11th Grade house is located near the Main Annex, the 12th Grade house is located near the South Satellite 9th Grade house is located in the West Satellite and the 10th Grade house is located in the East House Guidance. (This is as of 2019–2020; the houses rotate each year). In these houses, there are many contests, parties, and small social functions.

== Athletics ==
Arlington High School competes in Section 1 of the New York State Public High School Athletic Association.

Two Alumni and former members of the Arlington High School Varsity Softball Team, Jennifer Fisher (Induction Class of 2014) and Christia Mohan-Besko (Induction Class of 2022) have been inducted into the New York State High School Softball Hall of Fame.

The 2023-24 Football team finished 10–1, the first time in the history of the school.
