= Chelsea Cove, New York =

- Census-designated place
- Location within New York Location within the United States
- Coordinates: 41°36′47″N 73°44′51″W
- Country: United States
- State: New York
- County: Dutchess
- Town: Beekman

Area
  - Total: 0.16 sq mi (0.41 km^{2})
  - Land: 0.15 sq mi (0.40 km^{2})
  - Water: 0.0077 sq mi (0.02 km^{2})
- Elevation: 330 ft (100 m)

Population (2020)
  - Total: 1,150
  - Density: 7,460/sq mi (2,882/km^{2})
- Time zone: UTC-5 (Eastern (EST))
  - Summer (DST): UTC-4 (EDT)
- ZIP Code: 12533 (Hopewell Junction)
- Area code: 845
- FIPS code: 36-15060
- GNIS feature ID: 2806926

Chelsea Cove is a census-designated place (CDP) located in the town of Beekman in Dutchess County, New York, United States. It was first listed as a CDP prior to the 2020 census.

As of the 2020 census, Chelsea Cove had a population of 1,150.

Chelsea Cove is in southern Dutchess County, in the western part of Beekman, on the northern side of Sylvan Lake. It is 14 miles (23 km) southeast of Poughkeepsie and 10 miles (16 km) northeast of Fishkill.

== Demographics ==
Historical population
Census	Pop.	Note	%±
2020	1,150		—
U.S. Decennial Census
