= Sylvan Lake (New York) =

Lake in New York, United States of America

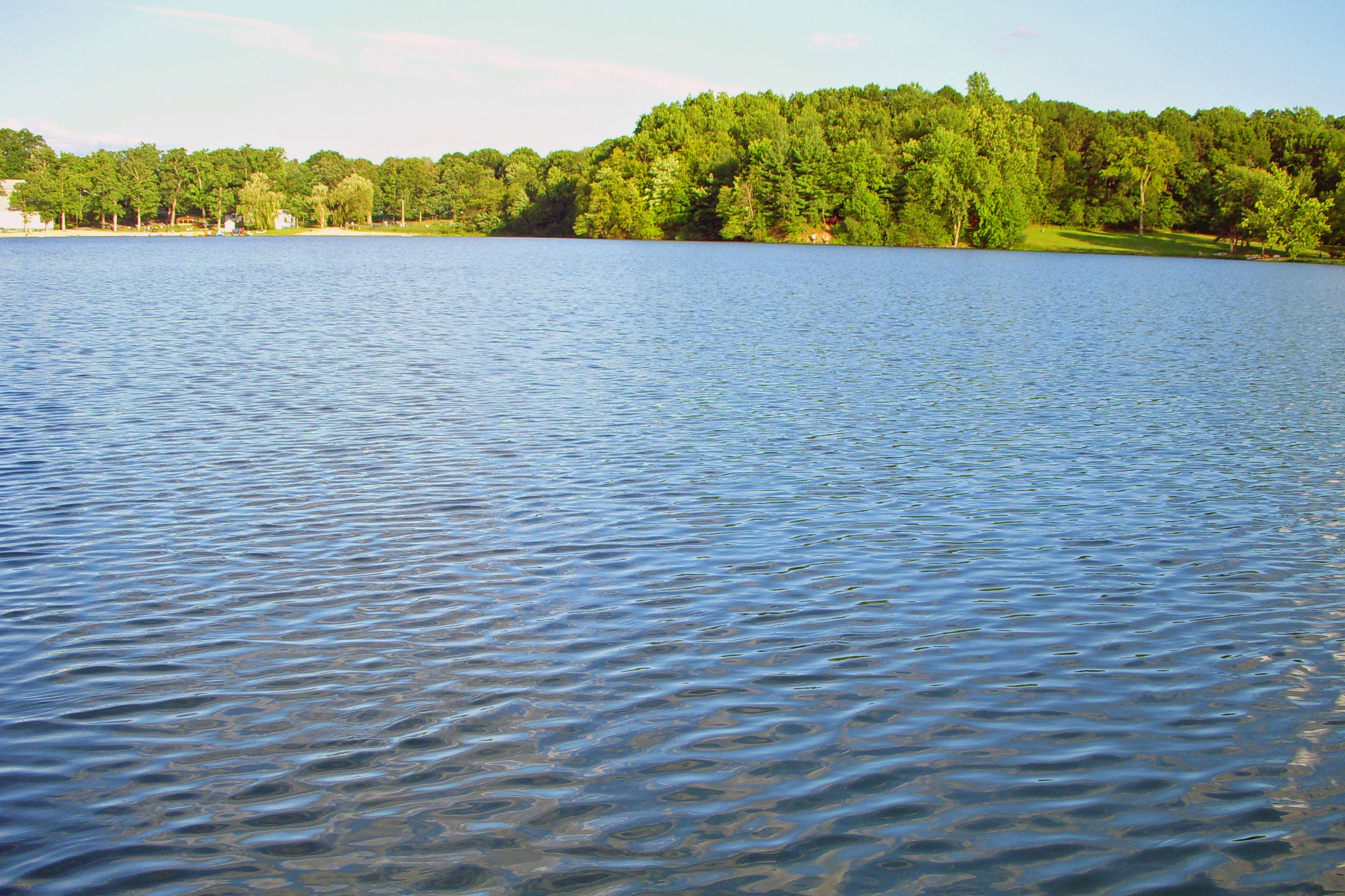
- View of north end of lake from south

- Location within New York Location within the United States
- Location: Sylvan Lake, New York, United States
- Coordinates: 41°36′32″N 73°44′28″W
- Primary outflows: Sylvan Lake Brook
- Catchment area: 0.81 square miles (2.1 km^{2})
- Basin countries: United States
- Surface area: 116 acres (47 ha)
- Average depth: 65 feet (20 m)
- Max. depth: 140 feet (43 m)
- Shore length^{1}: 1.8 miles (2.9 km)
- Surface elevation: 323 feet (98 m)
- Settlements: Sylvan Lake
- ^{1} Shore length is not a well-defined measure.

Sylvan Lake is located next to the community by that name in the Town of Beekman, New York, United States. It is the deepest and second-largest lake in Dutchess County.

It is a popular local recreation spot. Many summer camps are located along it, as well as a large private campground. Many residents from Chelsea Cove also use the lake recreationally.

== Geography ==
It is an irregular rounded shape, with a 116-acre (47 ha) surface area, located near the town's southwestern border with East Fishkill. High unnamed hills rise to 820 feet (250 m) to its northeast, 500 feet (150 m) above the lake. The unincorporated hamlet of Sylvan Lake is located to its southeast and east. Dutchess County Route 10 runs northwest from the hamlet along the lakeshore, providing access to the nearby Taconic State Parkway via the NY 82 state highway at Arthursburg.

To the southwest are lower hills. The lake's unnamed outlet brook flows at first northward through a 91-acre (37 ha) wetland between two smaller hills at that end but soon turns southward, carrying the drainage from the lake and its 0.81-square-mile (2.1 km^{2}) basin south a few miles to Fishkill Creek. From there it reaches the Hudson River at Beacon.

The lake is located adjacent to the Chelsea Cove housing complex and all its residents are permitted access to the lake. There is a small beach with a small area to wade in before it drops off into much deeper waters. Sylvan Lake Beach Park, a privately operated campground, is located along another shore. The remainder of the 1.8-mile (2.9 km) shoreline is owned by private residences and summer camps.

== Hydrology ==
The lake is 140 feet (43 m) deep, the deepest Dutchess County, the slope is very steep and reaches maximum depth quickly near the center of the lake. The thermocline in the lake reaches about 40 degrees F. To scuba dive in the lake, advanced open water certification is needed. Equipment such as 7mml full body wetsuits including gloves and hood are necessary as are lights due to the murkiness of the water.

== Recreation ==
The campground and camps have facilities for swimming in the lake near its shore. Boating is permitted on the lake as long as gasoline-powered engines are not used. Diving is also permitted with advanced open-water certification due to the lake's depth.

Angling, from either boats or the shoreline, is also permitted. Fishermen must have a valid New York state license. The lake has a bass population in its warmer areas, and the state Department of Environmental Conservation stocks it with 1,700 brown trout fry every spring. Special fishing regulations apply since the lake is also a popular ice fishing spot in winter. Trout may be taken all year round; there is no minimum size and up to five fish a day may be taken. Some anglers have taken trout as large as 10 pounds (4.5 kg).
