= Sylvan Lake, New York =

Hamlet in New York, United States

Coordinates: 41°36′27″N 73°44′04″W

Sylvan Lake is a hamlet located in the Town of Beekman, Dutchess County, New York, United States. It is named after the lake it sits on, which was formed during the Ice Age.

The early Indians originally named it "poughquag", which means "round body of water". A smaller lake known as Hidden Lake is where Daniel Delany, in the late 19th century, discovered iron ore and made his fortune. He eventually bought the adjacent property which was the entire shoreline of Sylvan Lake and rebuilt St. Denis Church for the town. Some iron ore mining also took place along the shores of Sylvan Lake in the early 1930s and some of these retainer wall pilings are still standing and can be clearly seen from a boat. When the mine was filled with water, construction equipment and mining tools were left on the bottom, and are present today.

== Links ==
- Town of Beekman official website
- U.S. Geological Survey Geographic Names Information System: Sylvan Lake (lake)
