= Titusville, New York =

- Census-designated place
- Location in Dutchess County and the state of New York
- Coordinates: 41°39′59″N 73°51′48″W
- Country: United States
- State: New York
- County: Dutchess
- Town: LaGrange

Area
  - Total: 0.69 sq mi (1.79 km^{2})
  - Land: 0.69 sq mi (1.79 km^{2})
  - Water: 0 sq mi (0.00 km^{2})
- Elevation: 220 ft (67 m)

Population (2020)
  - Total: 729
  - Density: 1,055.5/sq mi (407.55/km^{2})
- Time zone: UTC-5 (Eastern (EST))
  - Summer (DST): UTC-4 (EDT)
- ZIP Code: 12603 (Poughkeepsie)
- Area code: 845
- FIPS code: 36-74017
- GNIS feature ID: 2584296

Titusville is a hamlet and census-designated place in the town of LaGrange, New York, in Dutchess County, United States. As of the 2020 census, it had a population of 729.

== Geography ==
Titusville is in the southwestern part of the town of LaGrange, 5 miles (8 km) southeast of the city of Poughkeepsie. It is bordered to the south by the hamlet of Red Oaks Mill. According to the U.S. Census Bureau, the Titusville CDP has an area of 0.69 square miles (1.8 km^{2}), all land.

== Education ==
It is in the Arlington Central School District, which operates Arlington High School.

== Demographics ==
Historical population
Census	Pop.	Note	%±
2020	729		—
U.S. Decennial Census
