= James Baird State Park =

State park in Dutchess County, New York

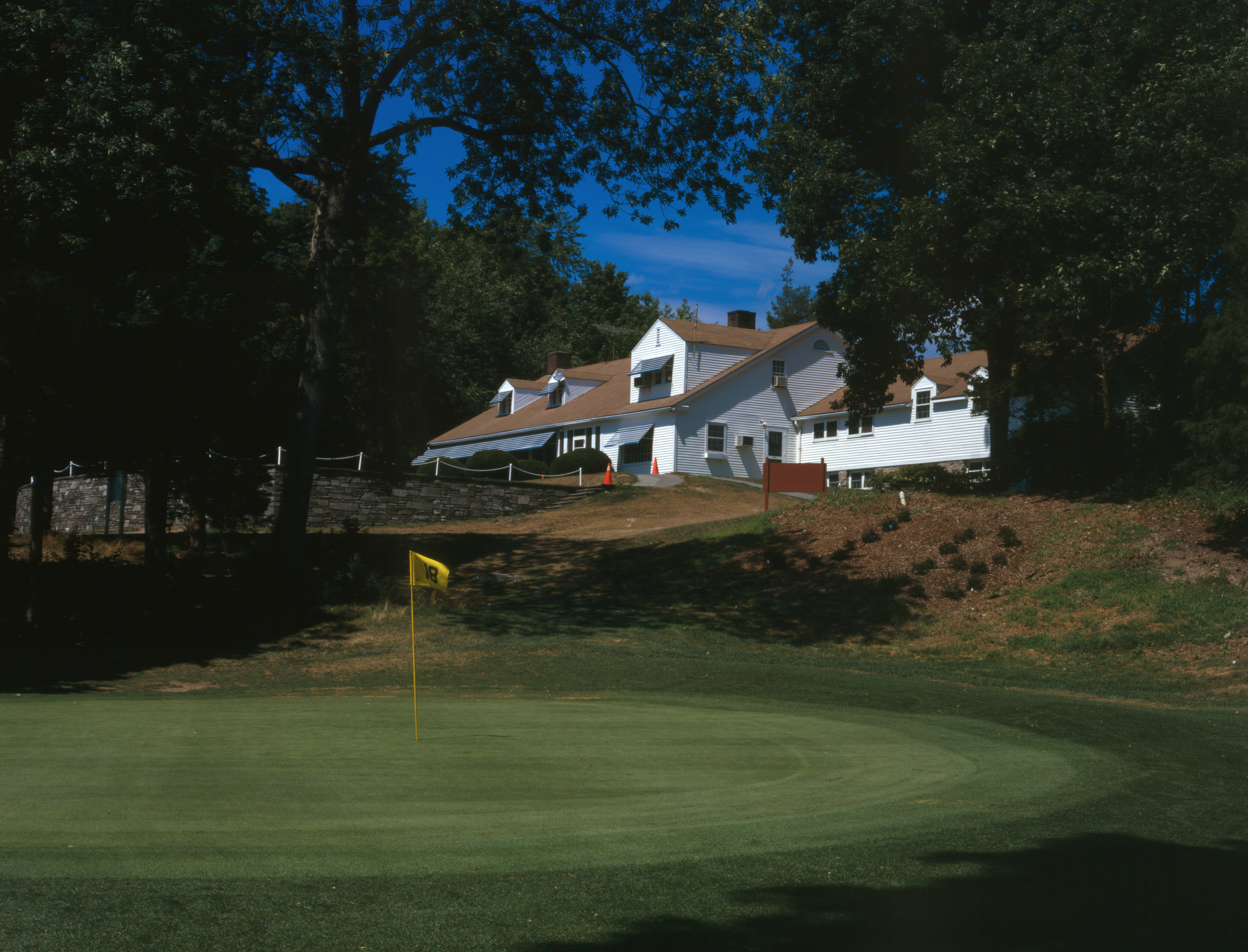
- The golf course and clubhouse at James Baird State Park

- Location within New York
- Type: State park
- Location: 14 Maintenance Lane; Pleasant Valley, New York
- Coordinates: 41°41′09″N 73°47′51″W
- Area: 590 acres (2.4 km^{2})
- Created: 1939
- Operator: New York State Office of Parks, Recreation and Historic Preservation
- Visitors: 103,618 (in 2014)
- Open: All year
- Website: James Baird State Park

James Baird State Park is a 590-acre (2.4 km^{2}) state park in Dutchess County, New York, United States. The park is located in the northern part of the Town of LaGrange, east of City of Poughkeepsie.

== History ==
The park is named after James Baird (engineer and president of the George A. Fuller Company, a construction company), the donor of the land. Baird, who held a Ph.D. in engineering, formed the construction company that erected the Lincoln Memorial and the Folger Shakespeare Library. He donated his land to the state in 1939 for a park.

The park formerly included a large community swimming pool, which was filled in by park management in the 1980s. Today, the bathhouse serves as a restroom and concession building has been demolished. The former pool area is bounded by rows of large elm trees.

== Description ==
James Baird State Park offers picnic tables with pavilions, a playground, recreation programs, hiking and biking, a nature trail, cross-country skiing, and a food concession. A sports complex that offers pickleball, softball, volleyball, basketball, and tennis is also included in the park, in addition to the 18-hole James Baird State Park Golf Course.

== See also ==
- List of New York state parks
