= Noxon House =

Historic Georgian residence

Coordinates: 39.436673°N 75.684324°W

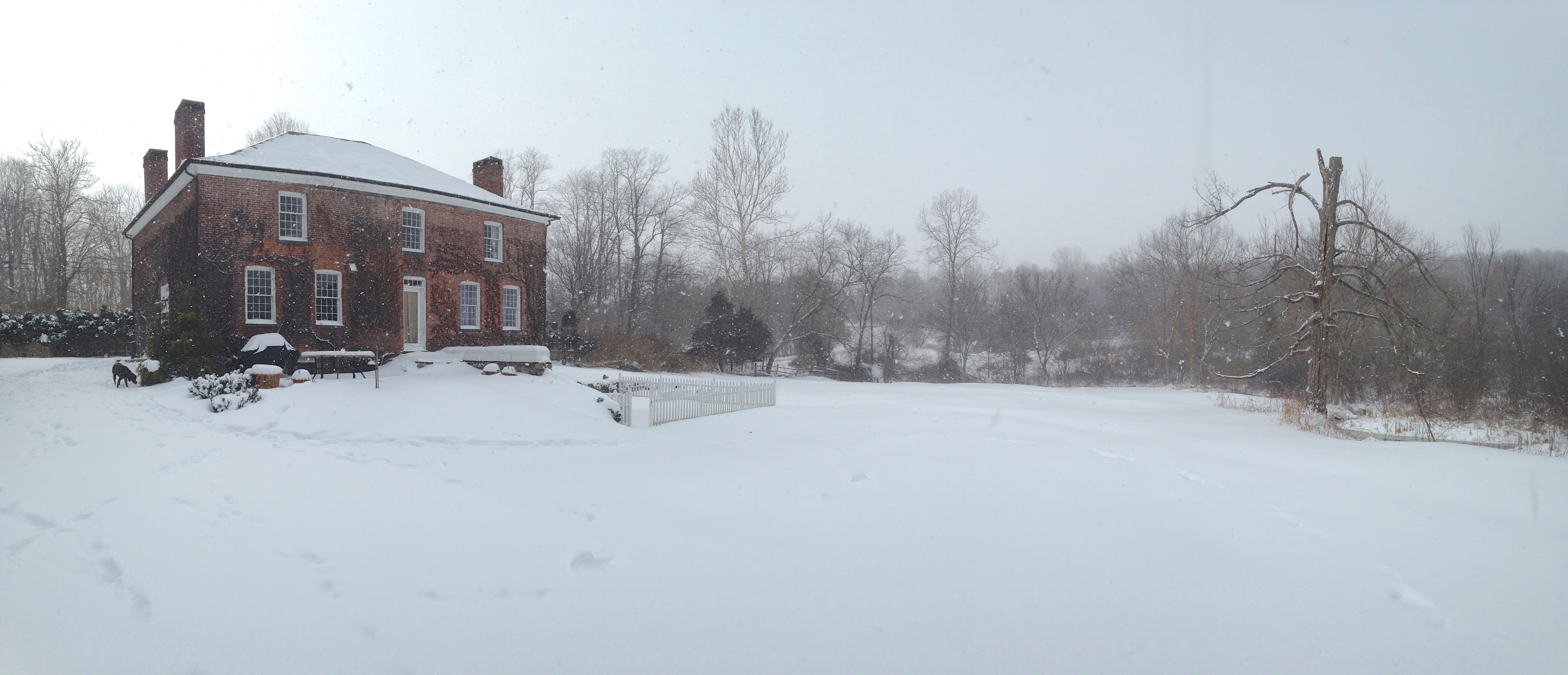
Rear view of the Noxon House, winter.

Noxon House is an historic Georgian residence in Poughquag in Dutchess County, New York. Built in 1770 by Benjamin Noxon (born 1745), it stands along the Old Upper Road.

== Description ==
Noxon House has a brick exterior, hipped roof, square, symmetrical rectangular shape, paneled front door at center decorative windows and elements on either side over front door, five double hung sash windows across the second floor front and four on the first floor, four and four paired chimneys. It preserves a typical Georgian floor plan inside, with four over four and a center staircase ascending, another staircase descending behind it to the lower level and what was the original kitchen for the house. That kitchen still retains a beehive bread oven, large fireplace and original fittings, panels and beamed ceiling. Throughout, the Noxon House preserves its original wide plank floors, original windows and glass panes, many original moldings and doors, eight fireplaces with original surrounds and mantels and original timbers and beams.

The house is mentioned in travel accounts from the early nineteenth century.

The old Poughquag Tavern, (now the residence of Daniel Thomas, Esq.) though of not so ancient origin as those just mentioned, yet may well claim mention here. It was built about the year 1800, by Henry Brill. It was afterwards considerably remodeled, but the front appearance is much the same as it was originally. This was the "half-way house" for the line of stages, running between New Mildorf and Poughkeepsie, and was well patronized by travelers and drovers. Its upper room has often resounded to the tread of the "light fantastic toe," and the loungers of the bar-room as often regaled with travelers' stories, for which the hardy adventurous life of those early times afforded abundant material. The Noxon house, built about the same time, was erected by Benjamin Noxon; and a portion of the brick of which it is constructed was manufactured on the farm on which it stands. It is rapidly falling into decay, and will soon be numbered among the things that were. The Beekman Cemetery is pleasantly located on the southern and western slope of a gentle eminence, north of the village of Poughquag. It is tastefully laid out, and decorated with evergreens, which mingling with the pure white marble of the numerous monuments and headstones, produce a pleasing effect.

—
