= Bill Noxon =

American football player and coach (1929–2016)

Biographical details
- Born: November 26, 1929
- Died: February 24, 2016 (aged 86); Grand Junction, Colorado, U.S.

Playing career

Football
- 1948: Fort Lewis
- 1950: Colorado A&M

Basketball
- 1948–1949: Fort Lewis
- Positions: End, halfback (football)

Coaching career (HC unless noted)

Football
- 1952–1966: Fruita HS (CO)
- 1967–1970: Grand Junction HS (CO)
- 1971–1984: Western State (CO)

Head coaching record
- Overall: 87–45–2
- Tournaments: 1–3 (NAIA D-I playoffs)

Accomplishments and honors

Championships
- 7 RMAC (1973–1979); 1 RMAC Mountain Division (1971)

William Edward Noxon (November 26, 1929 – February 24, 2016) was an American football coach. He served as the head football coach at Western State College of Colorado—now known as Western Colorado University—from 1971 to 1984, compiling a record of 87–45–2.

Noxon died on February 24, 2016, at HopeWest Hospice in Grand Junction, Colorado, from injuries he sustained in a fall the previous September.

== Head coaching record ==
=== College ===
Year	Team	Overall	Conference	Standing	Bowl/playoffs
Western State Mountaineers (Rocky Mountain Athletic Conference) (1971–1984)
1971	Western State	6–2–1	5–1	T–1st (Mountain)	
1972	Western State	6–3	4–2	T–2nd	
1973	Western State	6–3	5–1	1st	
1974	Western State	6–3	5–1	1st	
1975	Western State	9–1	7–0	1st	
1976	Western State	9–2	9–0	1st	L NAIA Division I Semifinal
1977	Western State	8–1	8–1	1st	
1978	Western State	10–1	8–0	1st	L NAIA Division I Semifinal
1979	Western State	8–2	7–1	1st	L NAIA Division I Quarterfinal
1980	Western State	6–4	5–3	4th	
1981	Western State	5–4	5–3	4th	
1982	Western State	3–6	2–6	7th	
1983	Western State	2–6–1	2–5–1	T–2nd	
1984	Western State	3–7	3–5	T–4th	
Western State:		87–45–2	75–29–1		
Total:		87–45–2			
National championship Conference title Conference division title or championship game berth
