= LaGrange, New York =

- Town
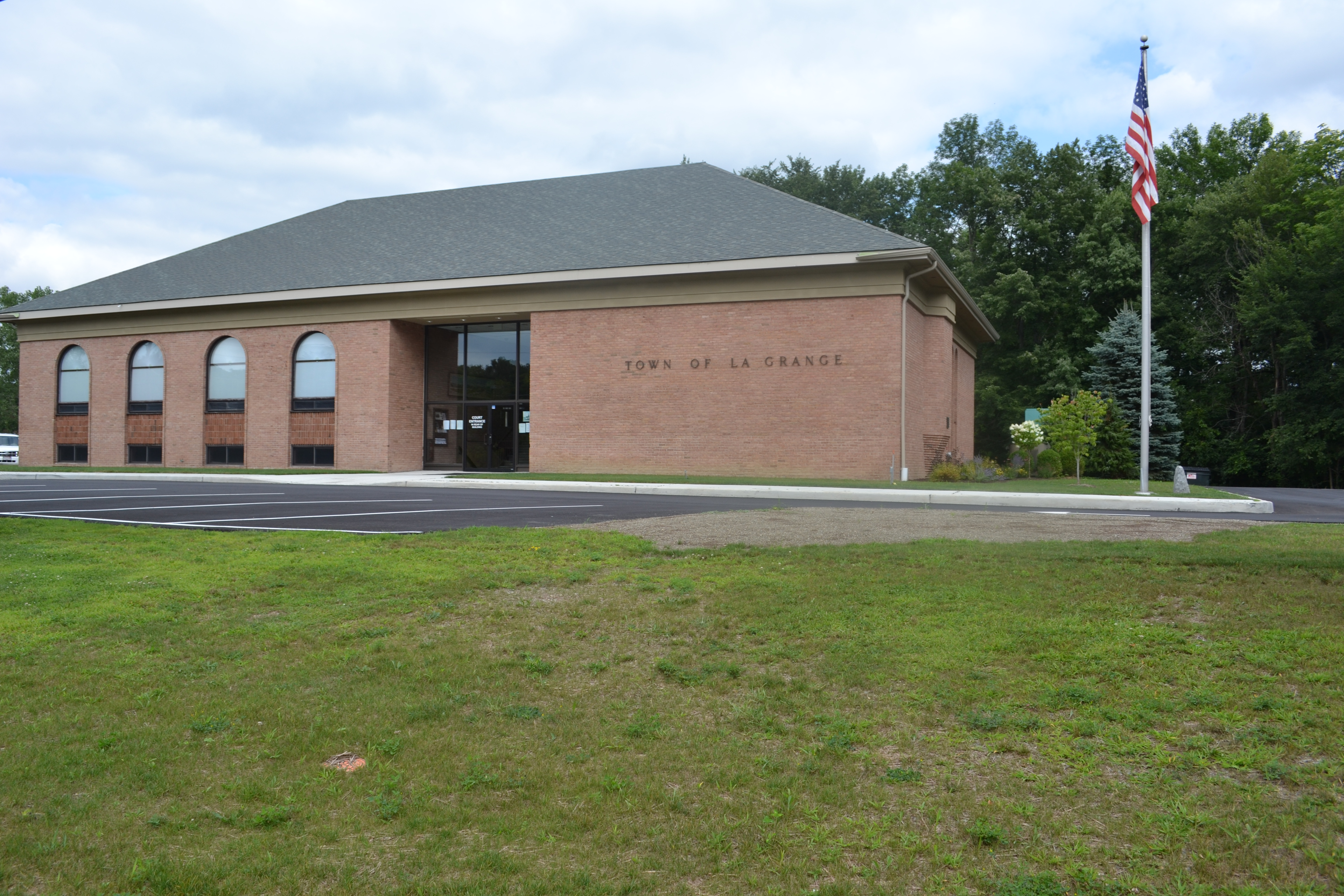
- Town Hall

- Seal

- Location of LaGrange, New York
- Coordinates: 41°40′23″N 73°48′24″W
- Country: United States
- State: New York
- County: Dutchess

Government
  - Type: Town Council
  - Town Supervisor: Alan Bell (R)
  - Town Council: Members' List: • Gary Baright (R); • Albert Rabosco (R); • Richard Ryan (R); • Susan Condon (R)

Area
  - Total: 40.35 sq mi (104.51 km^{2})
  - Land: 39.88 sq mi (103.29 km^{2})
  - Water: 0.47 sq mi (1.22 km^{2})
- Elevation: 322 ft (98 m)

Population (2020)
  - Total: 15,980
  - Estimate (2020): 16,050
  - Density: 392.0/sq mi (151.36/km^{2})
- Time zone: UTC-5 (Eastern (EST))
  - Summer (DST): UTC-4 (EDT)
- ZIP Codes: 12540 (Lagrangeville); 12569 (Pleasant Valley); 12603 (Poughkeepsie); 12590 (Wappingers Falls)
- Area code: 845
- FIPS code: 36-027-40299
- GNIS feature ID: 0979126
- Website: lagrangeny.gov

LaGrange (/ləˈɡreɪndʒ/ lə-GRAYNJ) is a town in Dutchess County, New York, United States. The population was 15,975 at the 2020 census. The town was named after the estate of the Marquis de Lafayette.

== History ==
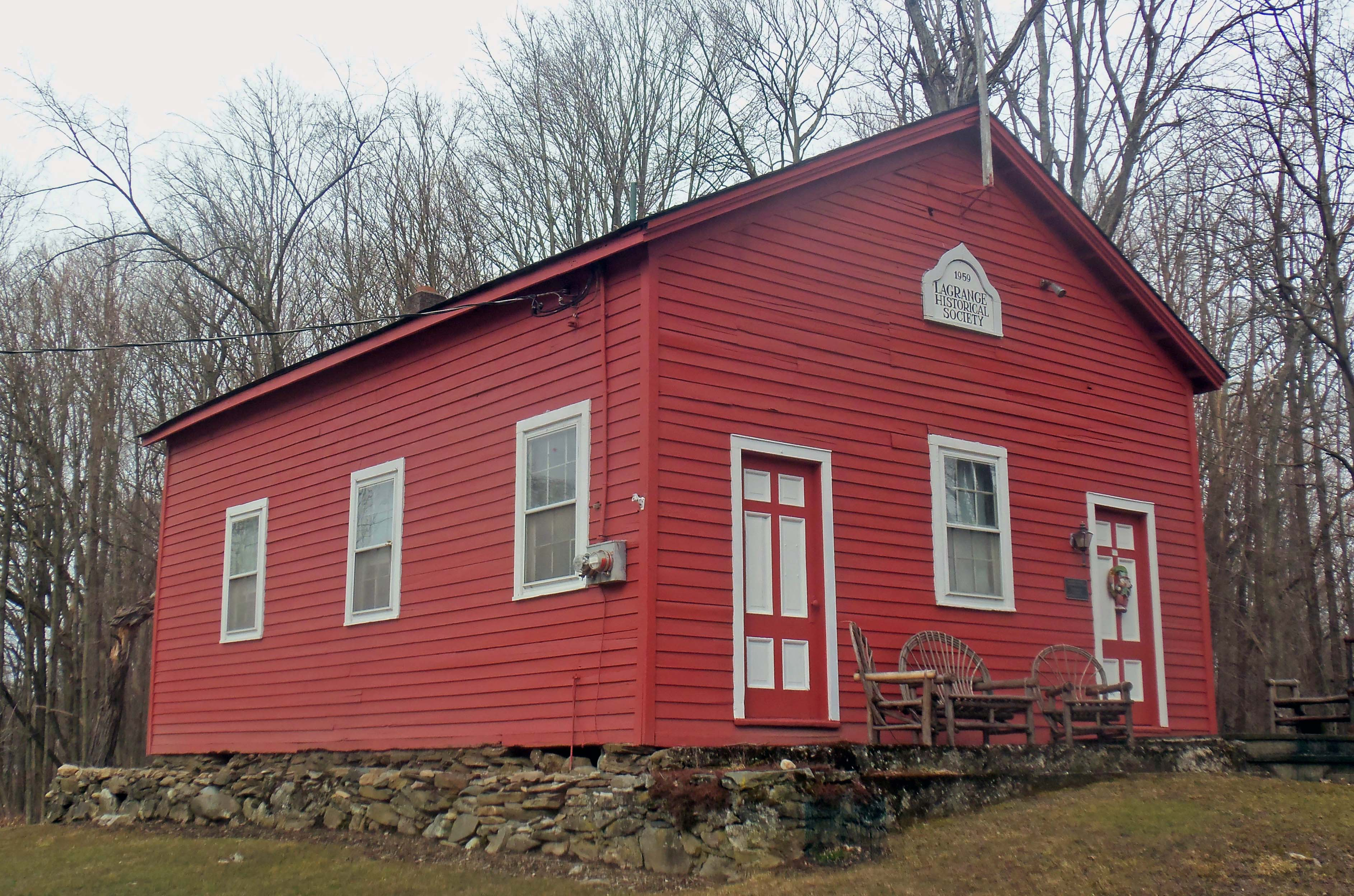
Old LaGrange District School, in Freedom Plains

The town was originally established in 1821 as "Freedom" from parts of the towns of Beekman and Fishkill. Confusion with Freedom, a town in Cattaraugus County that had been settled ten years earlier and established one year earlier, caused the name to be changed to "LaGrange" in 1828.

== Geography ==
According to the United States Census Bureau, the town has a total area of 40.3 square miles (104.5 km^{2}), of which 39.9 square miles (103.3 km^{2}) is land and 0.46 square miles (1.2 km^{2}), or 1.17%, is water. The town of LaGrange is located within the Hudson Valley region of New York. The towns bordering LaGrange are Union Vale to the east, Beekman to the southeast, East Fishkill and Wappinger to the south, Poughkeepsie to the west, and Pleasant Valley to the north, with a small part of Washington also bordering LaGrange.

=== Roads ===
Three state highways bisect the town and connect it with other towns in Dutchess County and the surrounding area. The Taconic State Parkway is a north–south parkway through LaGrange. James Baird State Park, which provides a golf course, playground, sports fields, and hiking and cycling trails, is located in LaGrange along the Taconic Parkway. The parkway also serves as an important commuter road for LaGrange, connecting the town to points south, including White Plains 51 miles (82 km) and New York City, 75 miles (121 km) to the south.

New York State Route 55 is an east–west road that goes through the center of the town; Arlington High School, the Freedom Plains United Presbyterian Church, and multiple shops and stores are located on a two-mile section of Route 55 in Freedom Plains, a hamlet of LaGrange. In the summer and fall of 2014, three traffic circles were added to this stretch of Route 55 in Freedom Plains in an effort to ease congestion and also to beautify this part of LaGrange. To the west, Route 55 connects LaGrange to the city of Poughkeepsie, the closest urbanized area to LaGrange; to the east, Route 55 connects LaGrange to the town of Pawling and the Route 22 corridor. It is located halfway between Poughkeepsie and Pawling, about 11 miles (18 km) from both.

New York State Route 82 is a highway that goes southwest–northeast through the town, from Hopewell Junction to Moores Mills. Route 82 connects LaGrange with Millbrook to the north and Hopewell Junction to the south.

There are also several county roads that go in various parts of the town.

== Parks and recreation ==
Freedom Park is the largest and most extensive park belonging to the town of LaGrange. At the park, there is a small, spring-fed lake in which patrons are permitted to swim under the supervision of Red Cross-trained lifeguards. There is a set of eight 25-yard lap lanes that enables the town to support a swim team. There is a concession that sells snacks at the lake. Freedom Park also boasts a bandstand and a large, permanent, open-air pavilion; there is a small playground as well. Each summer, a day camp is offered by the town at Freedom Park.

Other parks in LaGrange include Stringham Park, an extensive complex of soccer fields located on Stringham Road in the west of the town, and James Baird State Park, which provides a golf course, playground, and cycling and hiking trails.

== Demographics ==
Historical population
| Census | Pop. | Note | %± |
|---|---|---|---|
| 1830 | 2,044 | | — |
| 1840 | 1,851 | | −9.4% |
| 1850 | 1,941 | | 4.9% |
| 1860 | 1,850 | | −4.7% |
| 1870 | 1,774 | | −4.1% |
| 1880 | 1,745 | | −1.6% |
| 1890 | 1,463 | | −16.2% |
| 1900 | 1,304 | | −10.9% |
| 1910 | 1,350 | | 3.5% |
| 1920 | 1,132 | | −16.1% |
| 1930 | 1,210 | | 6.9% |
| 1940 | 1,638 | | 35.4% |
| 1950 | 2,280 | | 39.2% |
| 1960 | 6,079 | | 166.6% |
| 1970 | 10,902 | | 79.3% |
| 1980 | 12,375 | | 13.5% |
| 1990 | 13,274 | | 7.3% |
| 2000 | 14,928 | | 12.5% |
| 2010 | 15,730 | | 5.4% |
| 2020 | 15,975 | | 1.6% |
U.S. Decennial Census

As of the census of 2000, there were 14,928 people, 5,085 households, and 4,103 families residing in the town. The population density was 376.0 inhabitants per square mile (145.2/km^{2}). There were 5,240 housing units at an average density of 132.0 per square mile (51.0/km^{2}). The racial makeup of the town was 91.98% White, 2.41% African American, 0.12% Native American, 2.94% Asian, 1.14% from other races, and 1.41% from two or more races. Hispanic or Latino of any race were 4.26% of the population.

There were 5,085 households, out of which 40.6% had children under the age of 18 living with them, 71.2% were married couples living together, 6.5% had a female householder with no husband present, and 19.3% were non-families. 15.4% of all households were made up of individuals, and 5.5% had someone living alone who was 65 years of age or older. The average household size was 2.93 and the average family size was 3.28.

In the town, the population was spread out, with 28.5% under the age of 18, 5.9% from 18 to 24, 29.9% from 25 to 44, 25.3% from 45 to 64, and 10.4% who were 65 years of age or older. The median age was 38 years. For every 100 females, there were 97.5 males. For every 100 females age 18 and over, there were 96.0 males.

The median income for a household in the town was $74,881, and the median income for a family was $80,724. Males had a median income of $61,806 versus $36,955 for females. The per capita income for the town was $27,872. About 1.7% of families and 3.7% of the population were below the poverty line, including 4.2% of those under age 18 and 2.4% of those age 65 or over.

== Notable people ==
- Pierre A. Barker, former mayor of Buffalo, New York
- John Gatins, Oscar-nominated screenwriter
- Isaac R. Harrington, former mayor of Buffalo, New York
- Anthony Van Wyck, former member of the Wisconsin State Senate
- Jack 'Popeye' Doyle, former NYPD cop in charge of 1965 Dorothy Kilgallen death case.

== Communities and locations in LaGrange ==
- Arthursburg – A hamlet at the southern town line. It is named after Chester A. Arthur, twenty-first president of the United States.
- Billings – A hamlet north of LaGrangeville.
- Freedom Plains – A hamlet northwest of LaGrangeville.
- James Baird State Park – A state park in the northern part of the town.
- LaGrangeville (or La Grangeville)– A hamlet in the southeastern part of the town.
  - LaGrangeville is an area in LaGrange with the zip code of 12540. As of 2014, this area had a population of 8,221, which makes it the largest part of LaGrange.
- Manchester Bridge – A hamlet in the western part of the town.
- Moores Mill – A location in the northeastern part of the town.
- Noxon – A location west of LaGrangeville.
- Red Oaks Mill – A suburb of Poughkeepsie city that is also located in Poughkeepsie town.
- Rombout Ridge – A location near the western town line.
- Titus – A hamlet near the western town line.
- Titusville – A hamlet in the southwestern part of the town, north of Red Oaks Mill.

== Schools ==
Arlington High School and LaGrange Middle School of the Arlington Central School District are in LaGrange, as are several of the School District's primary, elementary and intermediate schools.
