= Beekman, New York =

- Town
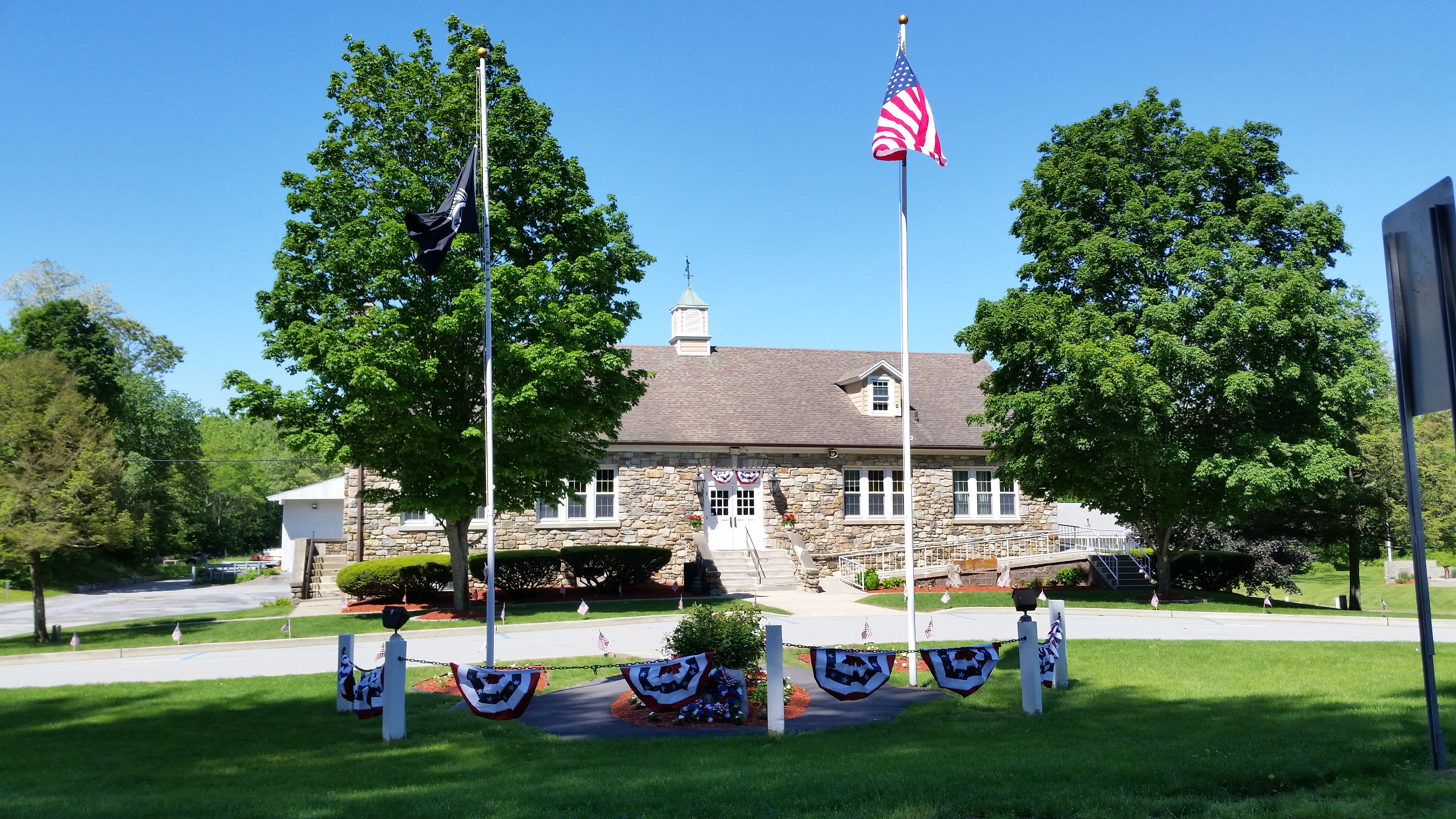
- Beekman Town Hall in 2017

- Seal
- Motto: "One of the Original Towns"
- Location of Beekman, New York
- Coordinates: 41°36′34″N 73°42′31″W
- Country: United States
- State: New York
- County: Dutchess
- Established: 1788

Government
  - Type: Town Council
  - Town Supervisor: Laureen Abbatantuono (R)
  - Town Council: Members' List: • Ezio Battaglini (R); • Robert Swartz (R); • Werner Stiegler (R)

Area
  - Total: 30.36 sq mi (78.62 km^{2})
  - Land: 29.84 sq mi (77.28 km^{2})
  - Water: 0.52 sq mi (1.34 km^{2})
- Elevation: 407 ft (124 m)

Population (2020)
  - Total: 14,172
- Time zone: UTC−5 (Eastern (EST))
  - Summer (DST): UTC−4 (EDT)
- ZIP Codes: 12570 (Poughquag); 12531 (Holmes); 12533 (Hopewell Junction); 12540 (Lagrangeville); 12564 (Pawling); 12582 (Stormville)
- Area code: 845
- FIPS code: 36-027-05452
- GNIS feature ID: 0978718
- Website: townofbeekman.gov

Beekman is a town in Dutchess County, New York, United States. It is part of the Kiryas Joel–Poughkeepsie–Newburgh metropolitan area as well as the larger New York metropolitan area. The population was 14,172 at the 2020 census. The town was named after Henry Beekman, a 17th-century land owner.

== History ==
Henry Beekman, holder of large land stakes in Dutchess County, lent his name to the area in the late seventeenth century

The "Beekman" name became attached to the area in 1697, from Henry Beekman, a Kingston native, who had a large land stake in Dutchess County. In 1697, while serving as a judge, "Beekman obtained a grant from the British crown for what was to be named the Beekman Patent," which included the present towns of Beekman, Pawling, Dover, Union Vale and "part of LaGrange." Henry was the son of Deputy Mayor of New York City Wilhemus Beekman, and also served as a delegate in the New York General Assembly beginning in 1691.

Wappinger Indians were reportedly the town's original residents before the first European settlers arrived around 1710. The Beekman Patent, granted to Beekman in 1697, was the second largest land holding in Dutchess County. In 1737, Beekman became an official precinct, and local government was established. 1788 was the initial period of establishing towns and counties in the newly independent state of New York, but parts were removed subsequently to form other towns. Beekman contributed part of its territory to the newer towns of LaGrange (1821) and Union Vale (1827). Iron ore extraction and smelting were important in the early economy. The Beekman Patent was a manor until after the Revolution. Residents could only lease the land and pay rent in wheat, fat fowls and work on roads. The series Settlers of the Beekman Patent chronicles the lives of all residents there in the 18th century.

A Lutheran church, located off Beach Road, was "probably the first house of worship" in the town. The church is "on the records from 1749" and "served the German settlers who came from the Palatine immigration." A Quaker meeting house was built in 1771 in Gardner Hollow, and was named the "Apoquague Preparative Meeting." St. Denis Church, a Catholic church located just beyond the East Fishkill line, also attracted worshipers from Beekman.

=== Late 19th century ===
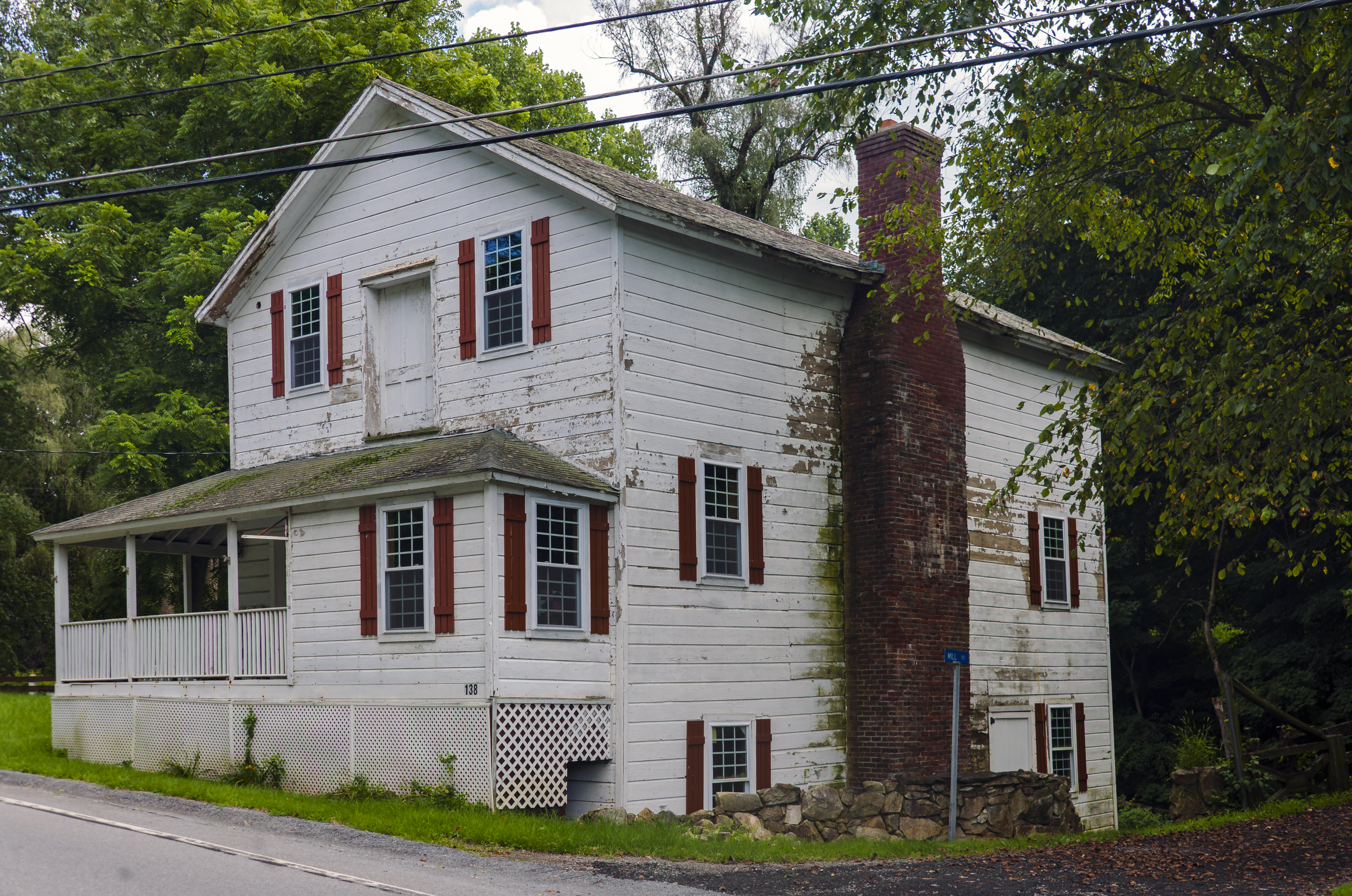
Murphy Grist Mill, where Franklin D. Roosevelt made a speech during his 1909 run for the New York State Senate

Beekman began its "boom" in the late 19th and early 20th centuries as the communities of Sylvan Lake, Beekmanville, and Clove Valley were in the active mining business. Many townsfolk that settled in town during this time were Irish men, escaping the Great Famine, and sent their families to Beekman as well. However, the mining industry died out in the late 19th century, with very few remains today. The most notable one, the "Beekman Furnace", is still intact on Furnace Road, just off Clove Valley Road.

=== Beekman in the 20th century ===
After the demise of the mining business in the late 19th century, Beekman saw another boom in the 20th century, with housing developments such as Dalton Farm, the first gas stations, and construction of the first supermarket in town and other stores signalling the beginning of suburban development.

Today Beekman has a total population of 14,000. Comparatively few farms remain, and commerce and industry increasingly shape the non-residential areas of the town.

== Geography ==
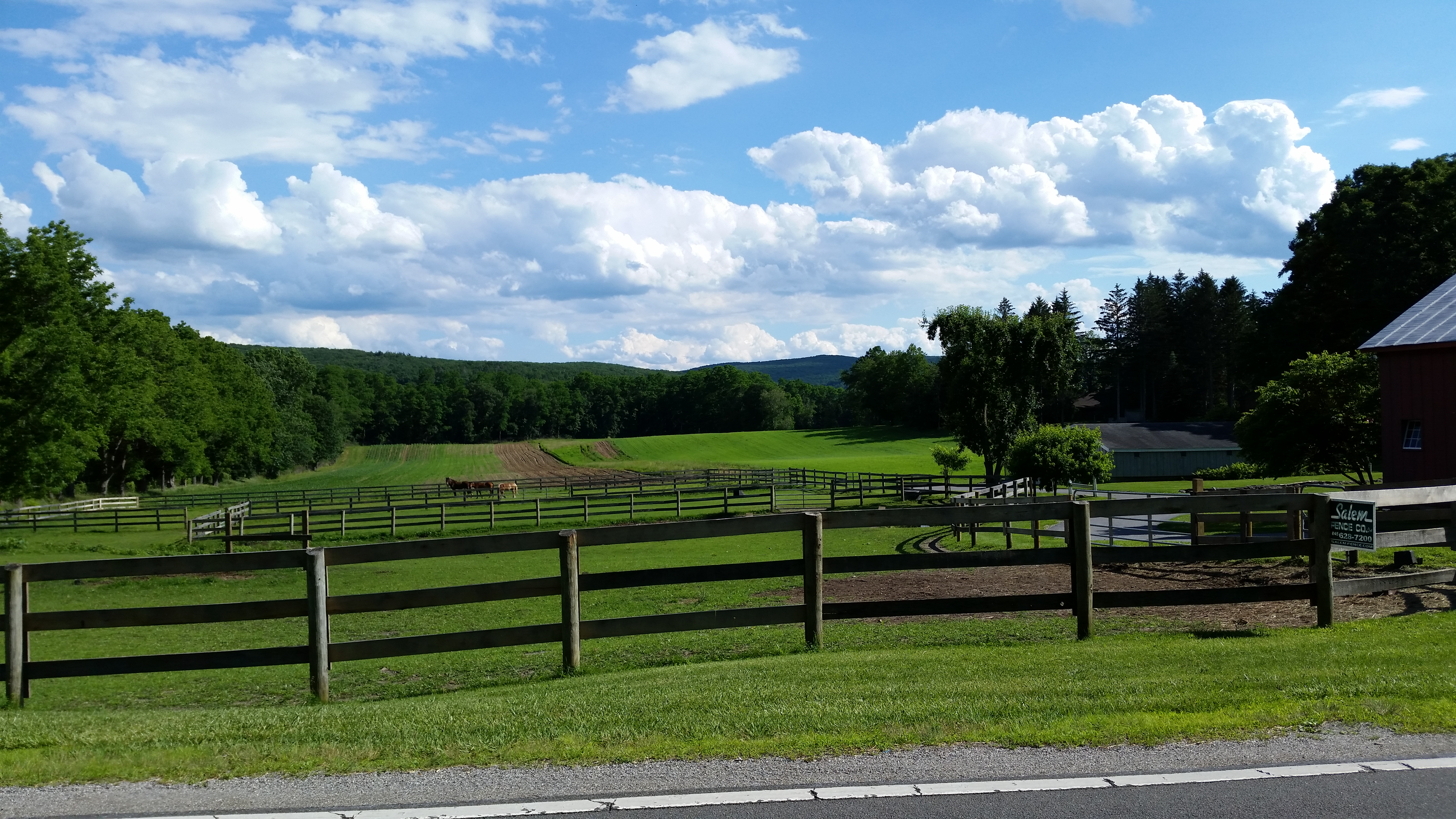
Farmland in Poughquag, on Gardner Hollow Road

Beekman is located in the southeastern part of Dutchess County, about 70 miles (110 km) north of New York City. According to the United States Census Bureau, the town has a total area of 30.3 square miles (78.6 km^{2}), of which 29.8 square miles (77.3 km^{2}) is land and 0.50 square miles (1.3 km^{2}), or 1.45%, is water. Beekman is bordered by the towns of East Fishkill to the southwest, LaGrange to the northwest, Union Vale to the north, Dover to the east and Pawling to the southeast.

Most of the town is drained by Fishkill Creek, which flows west to the Hudson River at Beacon. The southern corner of the town is drained by Stump Pond Creek, part of the Croton River watershed that flows to the Hudson at Croton-on-Hudson.

== Government and emergency services ==
=== Government ===
Since 1907 Beekman has operated under a Council-Manager form of government. The Town Supervisor is the chief administrative officer of the city selected to carry out the directives of the Council. The Manager monitors the city's fiscal condition and enforces its ordinances and laws. The Town Supervisor is also involved in the discussion of all matters coming before Council yet has no final vote. The Town Board is the legislative body consisting of the Town Supervisor and four council members. The Town Supervisor serves as the presiding officer of the Council. The Council functions to set policy, approve the annual budget, appoint the Town Supervisor and Town Clerk, and enact local laws, resolutions & ordinances.

=== Fire ===
The Beekman Fire District serves the town of Beekman with the sole fire station located in the hamlet of Poughquag at 316 Beekman Poughquag Road. Beekman has been assigned a department ID number of "34". Firefighters in Beekman get alerted via paging through the Dutchess County Department Of Emergency Response, which is located in Poughkeepsie.

Beekman Fire District was the first fire district in Southern Dutchess County, originating in 1937. Beekman was the first fire company formed within Dutchess County's 8 original towns in 1937, following East Fishkill Fire Department was formed, followed by Pawling. In 1977, Beekman was one of the first volunteer fire departments in the area to acquire the Hurst Tool. The fire department received the United States Life Safety Achievement Award for five consecutive years in 2003. The award recognizes local fire prevention that contribute to reducing the number of lives lost in Residential House Fires each year.

=== Police ===
Police protection to the Town of Beekman is provided by the Dutchess County Sheriff's Office and New York State Police. The DCSO have a substation located in the middle of town. When someone calls 911, the call is routed to the Dutchess 911 center in Poughkeepsie, New York and then police are polled for, and the closest unit responds. The MTA Police also cover the Depot Hill section of Beekman as the Metro-North Railroad Beacon Line passes through town with a grade crossing on Depot Hill Road.

=== Medical ===
Beekman has no medical facilities, but within a short distance from Beekman are three medical centers. Westchester Medical Center, Saint Francis Hospital and Vassar Brothers Medical Center are located in nearby Poughkeepsie, New York. Putnam Hospital is located in Carmel, New York in Putnam County.

=== State facilities ===
Green Haven Correctional Facility of the New York State Department of Corrections is in the town.

== Demographics ==
Historical population
Census	Pop.	Note	%±
1820	4,257		—
1830	1,584		−62.8%
1840	1,400		−11.6%
1850	1,386		−1.0%
1860	1,371		−1.1%
1870	1,486		8.4%
1880	1,578		6.2%
1890	1,113		−29.5%
1900	1,071		−3.8%
1910	827		−22.8%
1920	844		2.1%
1930	764		−9.5%
1940	790		3.4%
1950	1,703		115.6%
1960	3,326		95.3%
1970	5,701		71.4%
1980	7,139		25.2%
1990	10,447		46.3%
2000	13,655		30.7%
2010	14,621		7.1%
2020	14,172		−3.1%
U.S. Decennial Census

As of the census of 2000, there were 11,452 people, 3,751 households, and 3,034 families residing in the town. The population density was 381.7 inhabitants per square mile (147.4/km^{2}). There were 4,180 housing units at an average density of 139.3 per square mile (53.8/km^{2}). The racial makeup of the town was 93.24% white, 2.42% African American, 1.73% Asian, .18% Native American, .03% Pacific Islander, .94% from other races, and 1.46% from two or more races. Hispanic or Latino of any race were 5.38% of the population.

There were 3,751 households, out of which 46.3% had children under the age of 18 living with them, 70.0% were married couples living together, 7.7% had a female householder with no husband present, and 19.1% were non-families. 14.3% of all households were made up of individuals, and 3.8% had someone living alone who was 65 years of age or older. The average household size was 3.04 and the average family size was 3.41.

In the town, the population was spread out, with 30.9% under the age of 18, 6.1% from 18 to 24, 33.2% from 25 to 44, 22.3% from 45 to 64, and 7.5% who were 65 years of age or older. The median age was 36 years. For every 100 females, there were 100.6 males. For every 100 females age 18 and over, there were 98.1 males.

The median income for a household in the town was $65,610, and the median income for a family was $72,066. Males had a median income of $51,739 versus $32,119 for females. The per capita income for the town was $26,437. About 3.6% of families and 4.7% of the population were below the poverty line, including 5.3% of those under age 18 and 5.4% of those age 65 or over.

== Transportation ==
=== Road ===
Although Beekman has no major highways, it does have two major thoroughfares. New York State Route 55 crosses from the Pawling town line to the Union Vale town line and is a direct route northwest into the city of Poughkeepsie. Route 216 goes from Route 55 into the town of East Fishkill where it meets Route 52.

=== Rail ===
Metro-North Railroad's Beacon Line runs through the south end of town along Greenhaven Road and Depot Hill Road. It is currently a non-revenue line with no station stops, but is used for equipment moves between Beacon, Southeast and Danbury.

== Notable person ==
- Dan Brouthers, former Major League Baseball player, was born in Sylvan Lake

== Communities and locations in Beekman ==
- Beekman – The hamlet of Beekman is near the town center on Route 216 with the intersection of Routes 216 and 55 its east boundary. It was formerly known as "Beekmanville."
- Clove Valley – A hamlet in the northeastern part of the town on Route 216.
- Chelsea Cove – A census-designated place in the western part of town on Sylvan Lake.
- Green Haven – A hamlet south of Beekman village.
- Green Haven Correctional Facility – A state prison near the community of Green Haven.
- Poughquag – A hamlet east of Beekman village, running along Route 55 with that road's intersection with Route 216 its boundary with Beekman and Clove Valley. It is the main business district of the town and home of Beekman town hall. Murphy Grist Mill was added to the National Register of Historic Places in 2015.
- Sylvan Lake – A hamlet by the western town line. It is named after Sylvan Lake, which was formed during the ice age. The early Indians originally named it Poughquag, which means "round body of water". A smaller lake known as Hidden Lake is where Mr. Daniel Delany, in the late 19th century, discovered iron ore and made his fortune. He eventually bought the adjacent property, which was the entire shoreline of Sylvan Lake, and rebuilt St. Denis church for the town. Some iron ore mining also took place along the shores of Sylvan Lake in the early 1930s, and some of these retainer wall pilings are still standing and can be clearly seen from a boat. When the mine was filled with water, construction equipment and mining tools were left on the bottom, and are present today.

== See also ==
- Wilhelmus Beekman -father of Henry Beekman
- Noxon House
