= Carolyn Marks Blackwood =

American screenwriter and fine-art photographer

- Born: Carolyn Gail Marks; August 21, 1951 (age 75); Anchorage, Alaska, United States
- Education: John L. Miller Great Neck North High School; Livingston College at Rutgers University
- Occupations: Photographer, producer, singer-songwriter, composer, writer
- Years active: 1979–present
- Spouse(s): Greg Quinn (married since 2017); Christian Blackwood (married 1992–1992); Anthony Mulcahy (married 1983)
- Children: Gabriel Marks-Mulcahy
- Parent(s): Edwin Marks; Nancy Marks
- Website: www.cmblackwood.com

Carolyn Marks Blackwood (born August 21, 1951) is an American fine art photographer, film producer, writer, screenwriter, and singer-songwriter.

== Early life ==
Blackwood was born in Anchorage, Alaska in 1951 to Edwin and Nancy Marks. Blackwood moved to New York State as a child, and finally to the Hudson Valley region of New York in 1999.

== Career ==
Blackwood co-owns Magnolia Mae Films with her business partner Gabrielle Tana, and is best known for her work on the Academy Award-winning film The Duchess and on the Academy Award-nominated film Philomena. In addition to her work on Coriolanus, The Invisible Woman, and the 2016 Sergei Polunin documentary Dancer, she also produced the films The White Crow and My Zoe, the story of "a geneticist recovering from a toxic marriage [who] is raising her only daughter Zoe in conjunction with her ex-husband," which was released in 2019.

Blackwood's photography has been featured in solo and group exhibitions in Brussels, Los Angeles, New York City, and across the Northeastern United States, in addition to several book covers.

== Reception ==
Blackwood was an executive producer on the 2008 film The Duchess, which won three Academy Awards. She was also an executive producer on the film Philomena, which was nominated for four Oscars in 2013.

Since 2009, Blackwood's work as a photographer has been favorably recognized by various critics, including noted contemporary art critic, historian and curator Barbara Rose.

== Personal life ==
Blackwood has one child with former spouse Anthony Mulcahy, and was married to the late documentary film director Christian Blackwood until his death in July 1992.

Blackwood has been in a relationship with Greg Quinn since 1997 whom she married in April 2017. Blackwood and Quinn live in the Hudson Valley, in New York state where they co-own and jointly operate a blackcurrant farm.

== Filmography ==
Year	Film	Credit
2002	The Moth	Producer
2008	The Duchess	Executive Producer
2011	Coriolanus	Associate Executive Producer
2013	Philomena	Executive Producer
2013	The Invisible Woman	Producer
2016	Dancer	Executive Producer
2018	The White Crow	Producer
2019	My Zoe	Executive Producer
2021	The Dig	Producer
2022	Thirteen Lives	Executive Producer
2023	Firebrand	Producer
2023	Cottontail	Producer
2025	Long Day's Journey into Night	Producer
2025	The Keeper	Producer
2026	Elsinore	Producer
2026	A Talent for Murder	Producer
TBA	Forging Firefighters	Executive Producer

== Photography ==
Blackwood's photographic work is presently represented by Von Lintel Gallery in Los Angeles and the Roberto Polo Gallery in Brussels. Blackwood was named as one of the "five artists to watch" in the photography edition of Artnet News.

=== Solo exhibitions ===
- On the River, Lascano Gallery, Great Barrington, MA (2007)
- Let it Be in Sight of Thee, Hudson Opera House, Hudson, NY (2009)
- Let it Be in Sight of Thee, Hudson Opera House, Hudson, NY (2009)
- The Wind Blows Through the Doors of My Heart, Alan Klotz Gallery, New York, NY (2011)
- Solid, Liquid, Gas, Alan Klotz Gallery, New York, NY (2013)
- Strange Beauty, Mattatuck Museum, Waterbury, CT (2013)
- The Elements of Place, Albany Institute of History and Art, Albany, NY (2014)
- Adrift, Bard College, Annandale-on-Hudson, NY (2015)
- On the Edge, Von Lintel Gallery, Los Angeles, CA (2015)
- The Story Series, Roberto Polo Gallery, Brussels, Belgium (2017); Von Lintel Gallery (2018)
- The Story Series, Blanca Berlin Gallery, Madrid, Spain (2019)

=== Selected group exhibitions ===
- The Magic Hour, Paul Rodgers/9W Gallery, New York, NY (curated by Barbara Rose) (2007)
- The Art Show, Morton Memorial Library, Rhinecliff, NY (2007)
- A Winter's Bounty, Alan Klotz Gallery, New York, NY (2008)
- Hudson River Contemporary, Boscobel House and Gardens, Garrison, NY (2011)
- Seeing the Hudson, Alan Klotz Gallery, New York, NY Costa Nostra, Alan Klotz Gallery, New York, NY (2011)
- On Time and Place: Celebrating Scenic Hudson's 50 Years (2013)
- Urbanism, Carrie Haddad Gallery, Hudson, NY (2013)
- Here and Now: 80 Years of Photography at the Mint, Mint Museum, Charlotte, NC (2016)
- Elemental Perspectives: Land, Sea and Sky, Adamson Gallery, Washington D.C. (2016)
- Primary Forces, Nailya Alexander Gallery, New York, NY (2016)
- That Old School Dystopia, Theodore Art, Brooklyn, NY (2016)
- Non-Objectif Sud, Inc., Tulette, France (curated by Julie Ryan) (2017)
- Water, Nailya Alexander Gallery, New York, NY (2017)
- The Color of Light, The Nailya Alexander Gallery, NYC, NY (2019)

=== Book covers ===
- Swimming From Under My Father, by Michael O'Keefe (2009)
- The Wind Blows Thru the Doors of my Heart, by Deborah Diggs-Knopf (2010)
- Skyfaring: A Journey with a Pilot, by Mark Vanhoenacker (2015 Hardcover)
