= Greg Quinn =

Greg Quinn may refer to:

- Greg Quinn (farmer)
- Greg Quinn (politician)
