= Hudson Historic District (New York) =

Historic district in New York, United States

- U.S. National Register of Historic Places
- U.S. Historic district
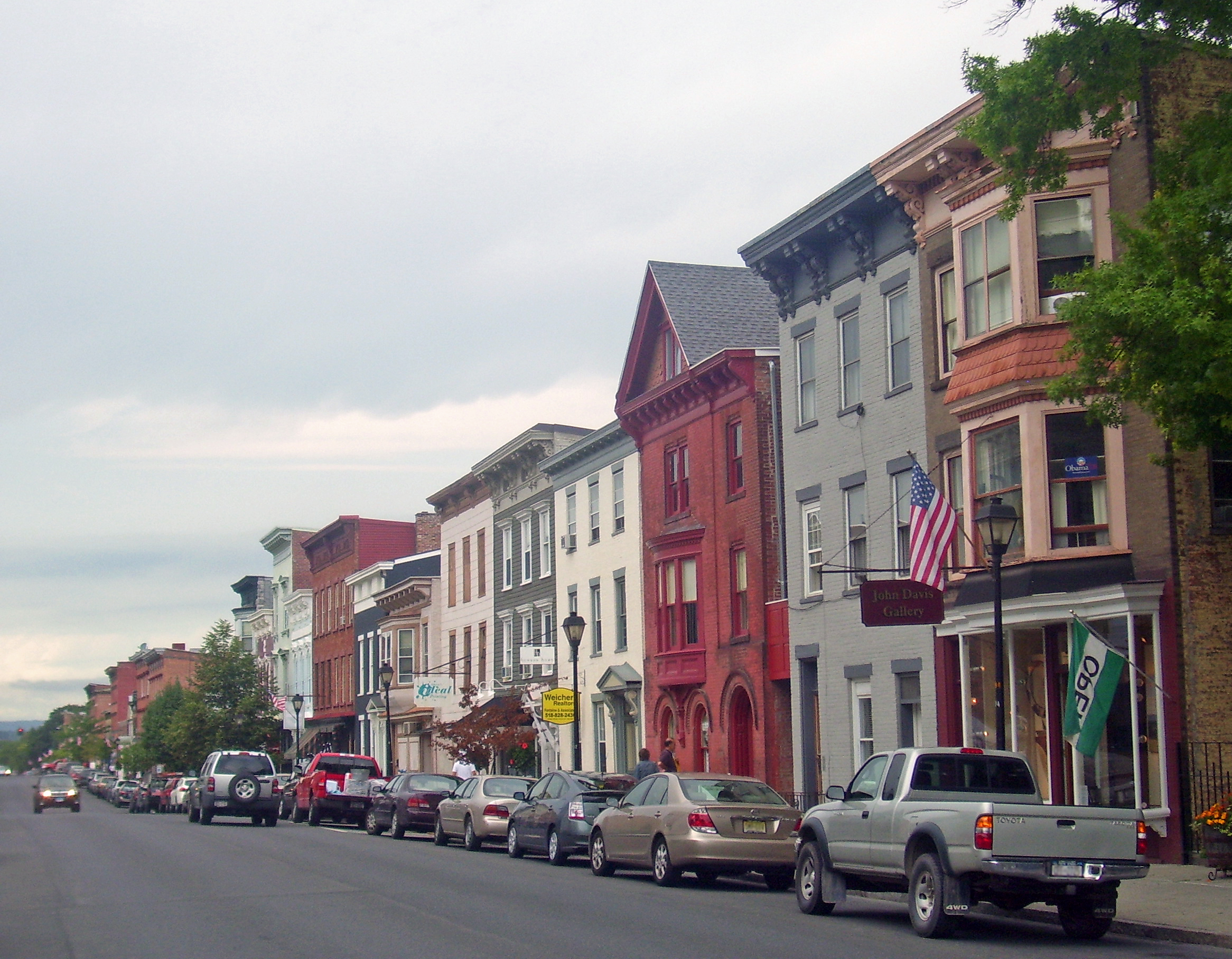
- View west along Warren Street from South Fourth, 2008

- Location within New York Location within the United States
- Location: Hudson, NY
- Coordinates: 42°15′04″N 73°47′19″W
- Area: 139 acres (56 ha)
- Built: 1783–1935
- Architectural style: Various 19th- and 20th-century styles
- MPS: Hudson MRA
- NRHP reference No.: 85003363
- Added to NRHP: 1985

The Hudson Historic District includes most of downtown Hudson, New York, United States, once called "one of the richest dictionaries of architectural history in New York State". It is a 139-acre (56 ha) area stretching from the city's waterfront on the east bank of the Hudson River to almost its eastern boundary, with a core area of 45 blocks. It has 756 contributing properties, most of which date from the city's founding in 1785 to the mid-1930s. In 1985 it was listed on the National Register of Historic Places.

It includes part of Hudson's original Front Street-Parade Hill-Lower Warren Street Historic District, excluding portions which were demolished soon after that district was designated in 1970. It is one of the rare downtowns to have followed the grid plan laid out by its 18th-century founders through the present day, and Warren Street, its main artery, is New York's most intact 19th-century main commercial street.

The oldest buildings in the district reflect the city's post-Revolutionary origins as a safe harbor for New England whalers, a past alluded to today by the whales on the street signs. It later became an industrial center, with areas of worker housing and grand homes of factory owners in its downtown. In the early 20th century, the rise of officially-tolerated prostitution on what is today Columbia Street made the city known as "the little town with the big red-light district."

Historic preservation efforts since the district's establishment have helped spur the city's economic renewal. Shortly after the district was designated, antiques dealers began setting up shops on Warren Street, leading eventually to what The New York Times described as "the best antiques shopping in the Northeast". Art galleries followed, and many weekend visitors have relocated to Hudson full-time, including some celebrities. The new arrivals have restored old houses they have purchased. The city has established a Historic Preservation Commission to protect the district's historic character.

== Geography ==
The district is irregularly shaped but generally follows the northwest-southeast rectangle of the city's grid, centering with the nine-by-five-block area along Warren Street, Hudson's main artery, which is almost entirely within it, and The western end takes in the area on the west side of Front Street and the city's waterfront. A block of Warren connects this one to central area of the district, bounded by the rear property lines on Warren in the north and Allen Street to the south. It contains 748 contributing buildings, five contributing structures and three contributing objects.

At South Third Street (NY 9G/23B), it excludes a modern building on the southeast corner of the intersection but then includes all the properties on the east side down to a former railroad right-of-way. A northern bulge includes the properties along North Fourth Street to State Street to take in the library, and on the north side of that intersection. At the eastern end the district boundary follows the railroad tracks to North Seventh Street, extends east along Warren Street, at that point part of US 9.

Here the district extends north of Warren again, taking in properties on North Sixth and North Seventh up to State Street, and part of Columbia Street as well. Another section juts out along Warren and Columbia to Eighth Street, just below the hospital and the nearby Rossman-Prospect Avenue Historic District; this was an area that housed workers at an iron works to the north. After taking in part of Union Street, it meets the southern boundary at the former railroad tracks across from South Seventh Street.

The land within this district is heavily developed, with a mixed-use character predominating. Storefronts predominate at street level in its core areas along Allen, Union and Warren streets. A few larger residences are located near the center of the district on those streets; smaller ones predominate on the quieter side streets. Public buildings like the Columbia County courthouse and post office are located around the junction of Warren and South Fourth. There are several churches and industrial buildings scattered throughout the district, and three major open areas: Promenade Park at the west end, Courthouse Square, and the square bounded by Columbia, North Seventh and Warren streets and Park Place in the east end.

== History ==
Hudson was one of the first planned cities in America. Long after its founders and their industry had died, their plan continued to guide its growth.

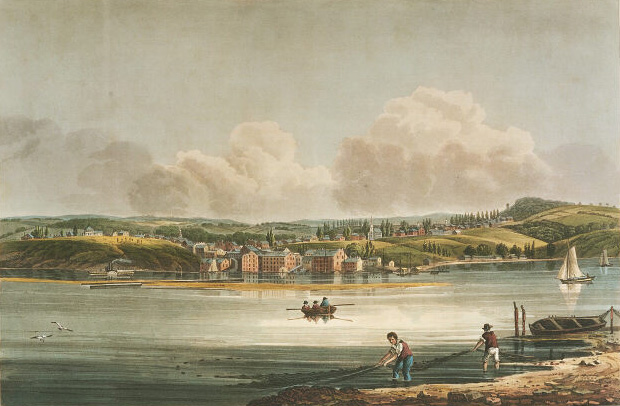
Painting of early Hudson from across the river

=== 18th century ===
For most of the colonial period and during the Revolution, Hudson was a small waterfront area with little development known as Claverack Landing. That began to change in 1783 when a group of New England whalers, many of them Quakers, came west looking for somewhere they could put their ships where the British could not easily find them and destroy them. Claverack Landing, between what were then two small bays near the furthest point up the Hudson River accessible to oceangoing ships, seemed ideal. They bought the land from a Dutch settler in the area. Calling themselves the Proprietors, they divided the land into lots of equal size and made an agreement that they would either settle their land themselves or sell it at cost.

By 1785 enough settlers had arrived from Nantucket and Rhode Island that they were able to incorporate as a city, the first in New York since independence and the third in the state. They set aside the high ground today known as Promenade Hill overlooking the water at the district's west end as a "Parade", an open leisure ground for the citizens. Some disassembled their New England houses and reconstructed them on the 50-by-120-foot (15 by 37 m) lots they had divided their land into.

Those who built new homes used the vernacular traditions of the New England ports they had come from, building center-chimney frame houses such as 116 Union Street. They generally eschewed the Dutch traditions of the Hudson Valley. The gambrel roof on 126 Union Street is not inspired by the many ones on Dutch buildings in the area but by older New England models.

They established the city's grid pattern of streets, long before many of them were built on or even built. Gangways 20 feet (6.1 m) wide were laid out between long streets, creating the alleys that still exist. Warren Street was intended to be the main commercial street, with Fourth providing the north-south axis. Three years after the city was founded, a visiting European described a thriving commercial city.

In 1800 the city had 4,000 residents, with the area out to Sixth Street established. Hudson remained within this grid for most of the next century. Within it a pattern was established that persists today, with the area north of Warren primarily home to the local working class and the blocks to the south the streets of the affluent.

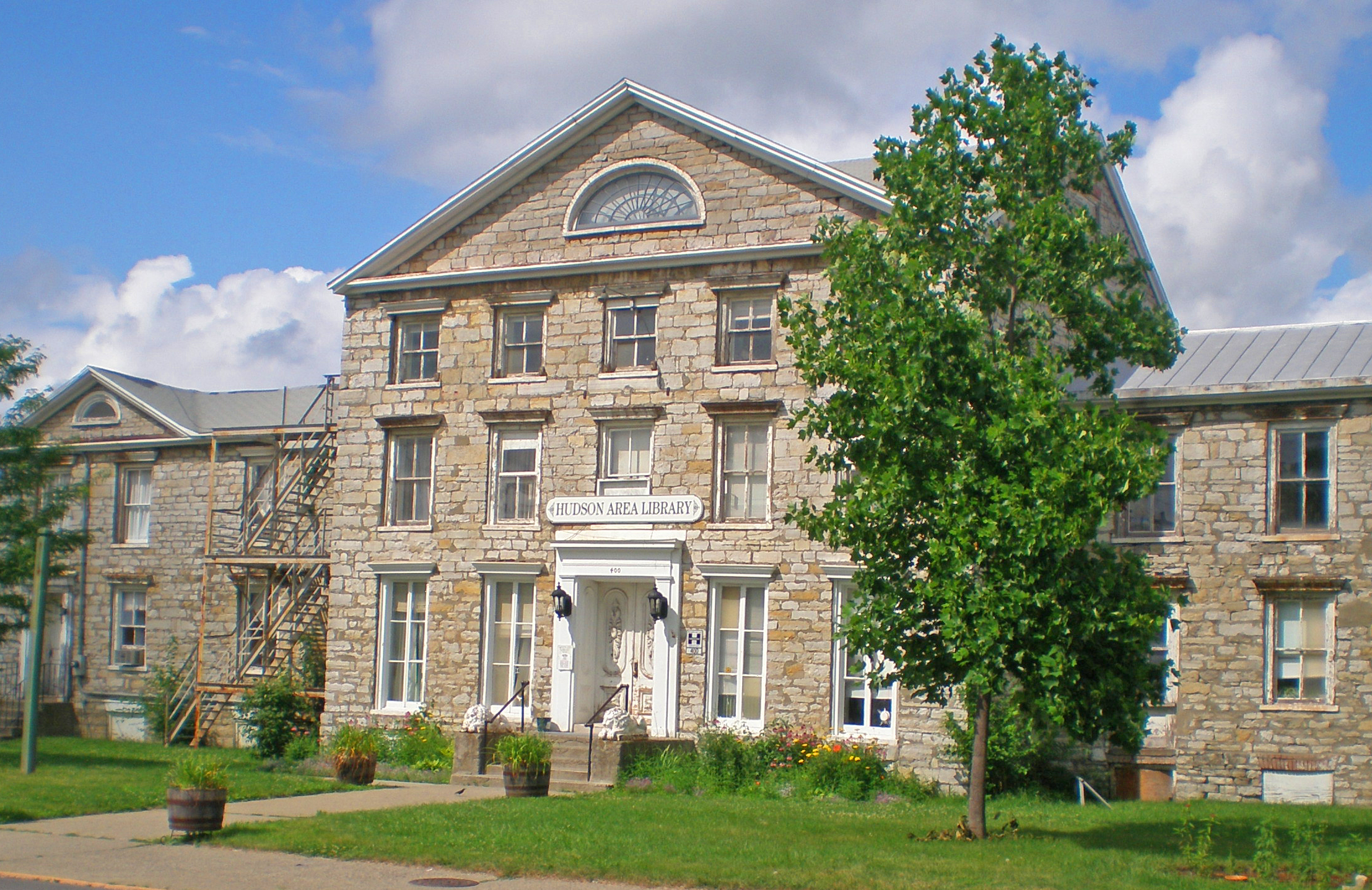
The Hudson Almshouse, built in Federal style in 1816

=== 19th century ===
The early years of the new century saw the children of the city's founders build their homes in the new Federal style. The earliest are the many two-story, five-bay brick houses on Front Street and the western sections of Union and Warren. Most remain within the New England structural models of the city's earliest houses, continuing to set Hudson's Federal buildings apart from those erected in surrounding communities. Later applications, like the Robert Jenkins House at 113 Warren, show the style's maturity with marble detailing, elliptical fanlights, and restrained proportions.

After the War of 1812 and the British blockade, the American whaling industry slackened for a while but then revived in the 1830s. This economic boom manifested itself architecturally with the Greek Revival. Many were built, including a large concentration on Columbia Street east of Park Place. Notable single examples are the ornate Curtis House at 32 Warren and the temple houses at 51 Partition Street and 738 Warren. Around 1850, the embrace of the Picturesque mode changed the city's architectural mix, integrating it more closely with the region, where the Carpenter Gothic style championed by Andrew Jackson Downing had first gained popularity.

This boom subsided as petroleum began to displace whale oil throughout the 1840s. The construction of the Hudson River Railroad later in that decade cut the city off from its harbor, ending its days as a whaling center. But it, and the Erie Canal-related traffic along the river, gave it new life as an industrial center. As in many other Northeastern cities, textile manufacturing developed. Brickyards prospered as well, and the Allen Paper Car Wheel Works became the business associated with the city. The Cornelius H. Evans House, at 414-416 Warren Street, is the most emblematic of this era of the city's development. It is a large brick Second Empire house that was home to a successful local brewer/bottler and his family.

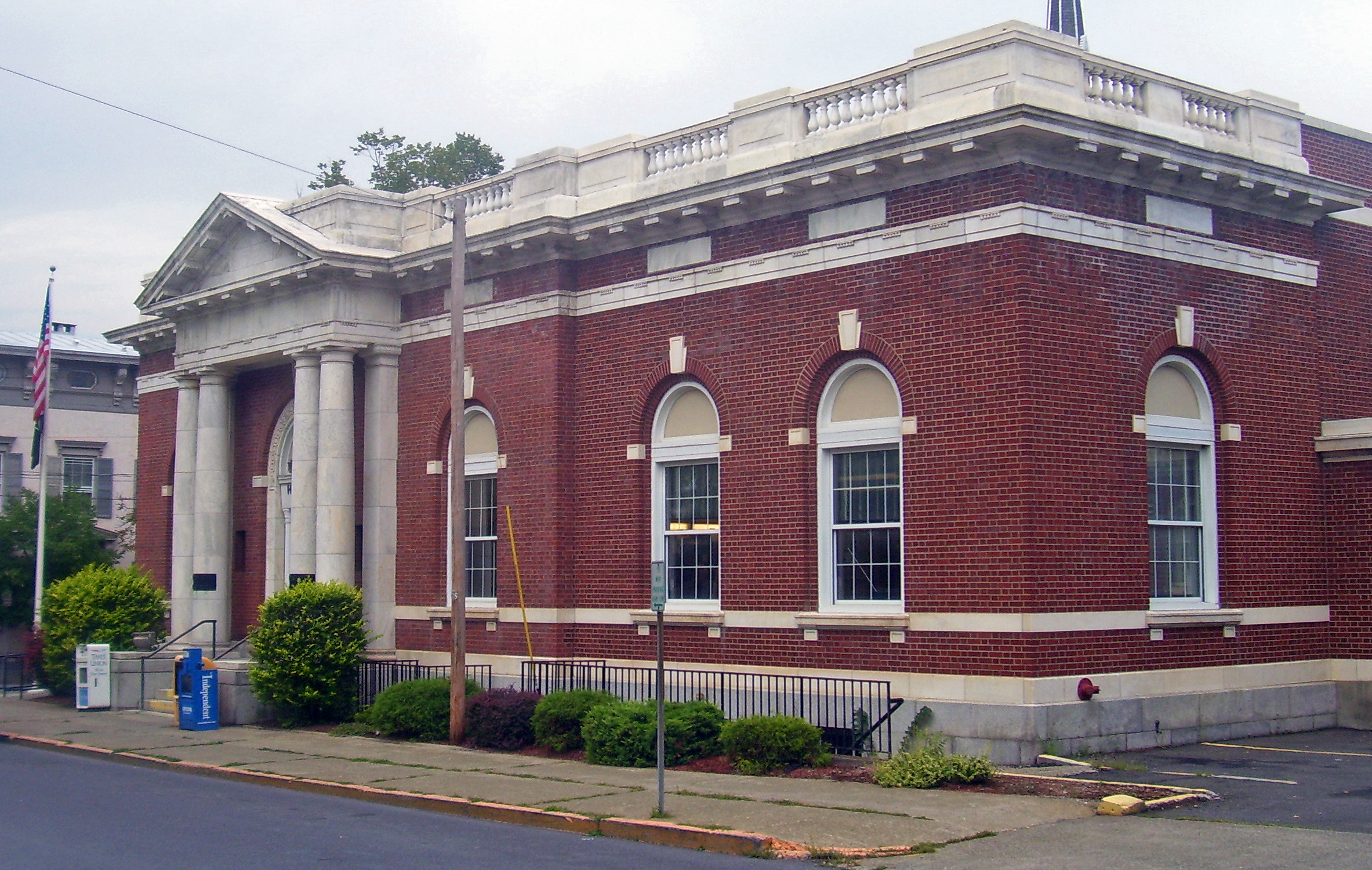
1911 post office

=== 20th century ===
The industries launched in the 19th century had begun to decline by that century's end, but the city's economy remained strong. Warren & Wetmore designed a new county courthouse in 1900, and its Classical Revival design was echoed by smaller porticoes on the new post office built across the street a decade later. The grid had become almost built out by this time, and the western areas, near the waterfront, were now heavily industrialized and less desirable as a residential neighborhood. There are a few examples of early 20th-century styles scattered around the district, such as the former YMCA building at 521 Union Street.

Most new development in the early 20th century was concentrated on Warren Street. Four churches and one school were built. During that time, the city's economy found a new mainstay: prostitution. Old homes along Diamond Street were converted into brothels, until 15 were in operation. The city was known for its red-light district around the country and even overseas. Gangsters like Legs Diamond were frequent customers, and their influence and the money they spread around helped foster the corruption of local police and government officials that let the brothels flourish. It ended in 1950 when the state police raided the brothels on Diamond, now renamed Columbia Street, and arrested many of their owners. Many never returned to the city and the brothels never reopened.

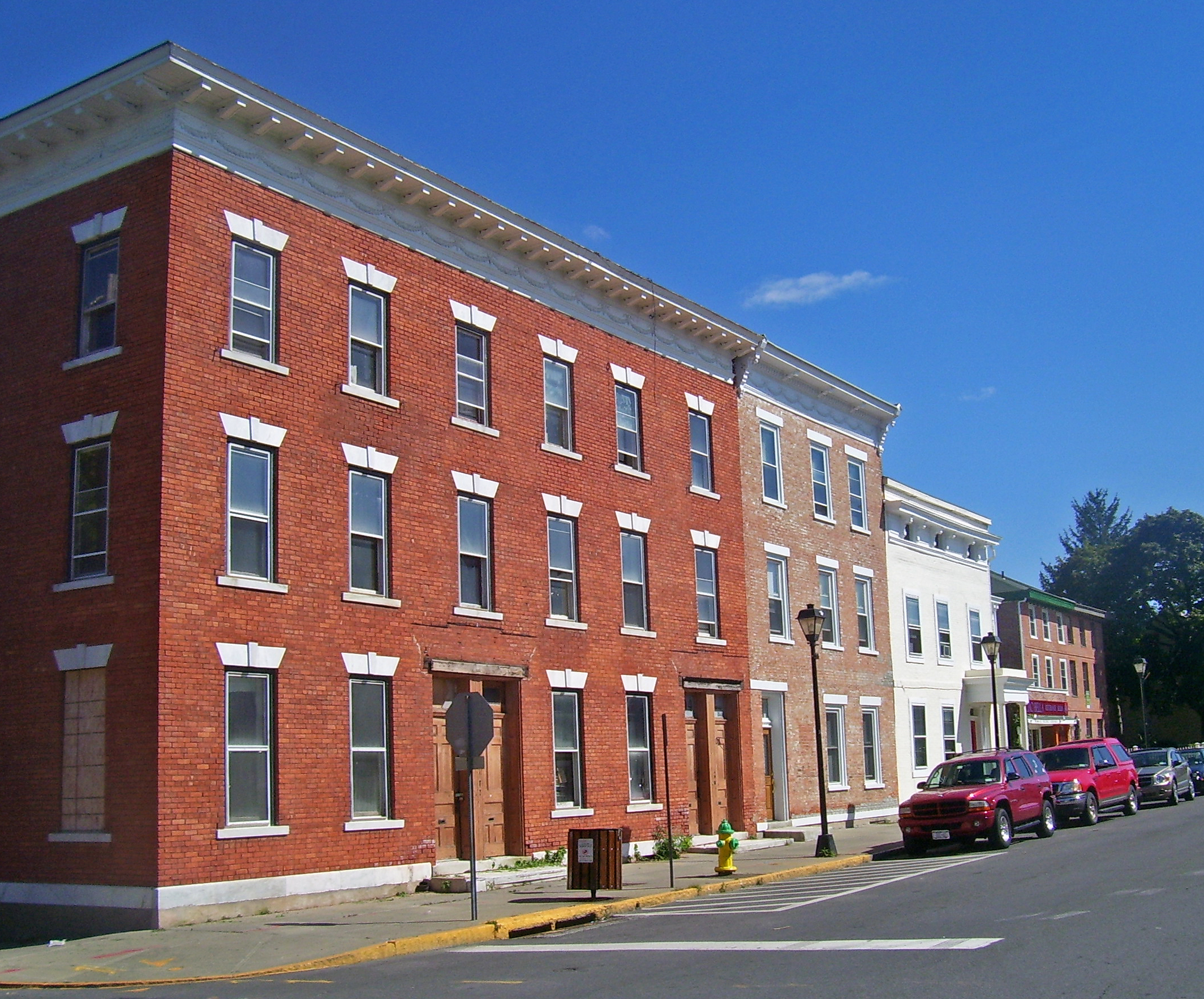
Lower Warren Street

No new industry followed in the wake of their decline, and as the late 20th century began the city declined again. In 1970 the western portion of the current district was listed on the then-new National Register as the Front Street-Parade Hill-Lower Warren Street Historic District. The listing was not enough to prevent the demolition of some older structures on Front Street; and when the current district was created in 1985, those areas were excluded. A total of 48 properties from the previous district are extant and listed in the current one.

== Significant contributing properties ==
Two of the buildings within the district have been listed on the National Register in their own right, one prior to its creation and one since. Several others are notable within it.

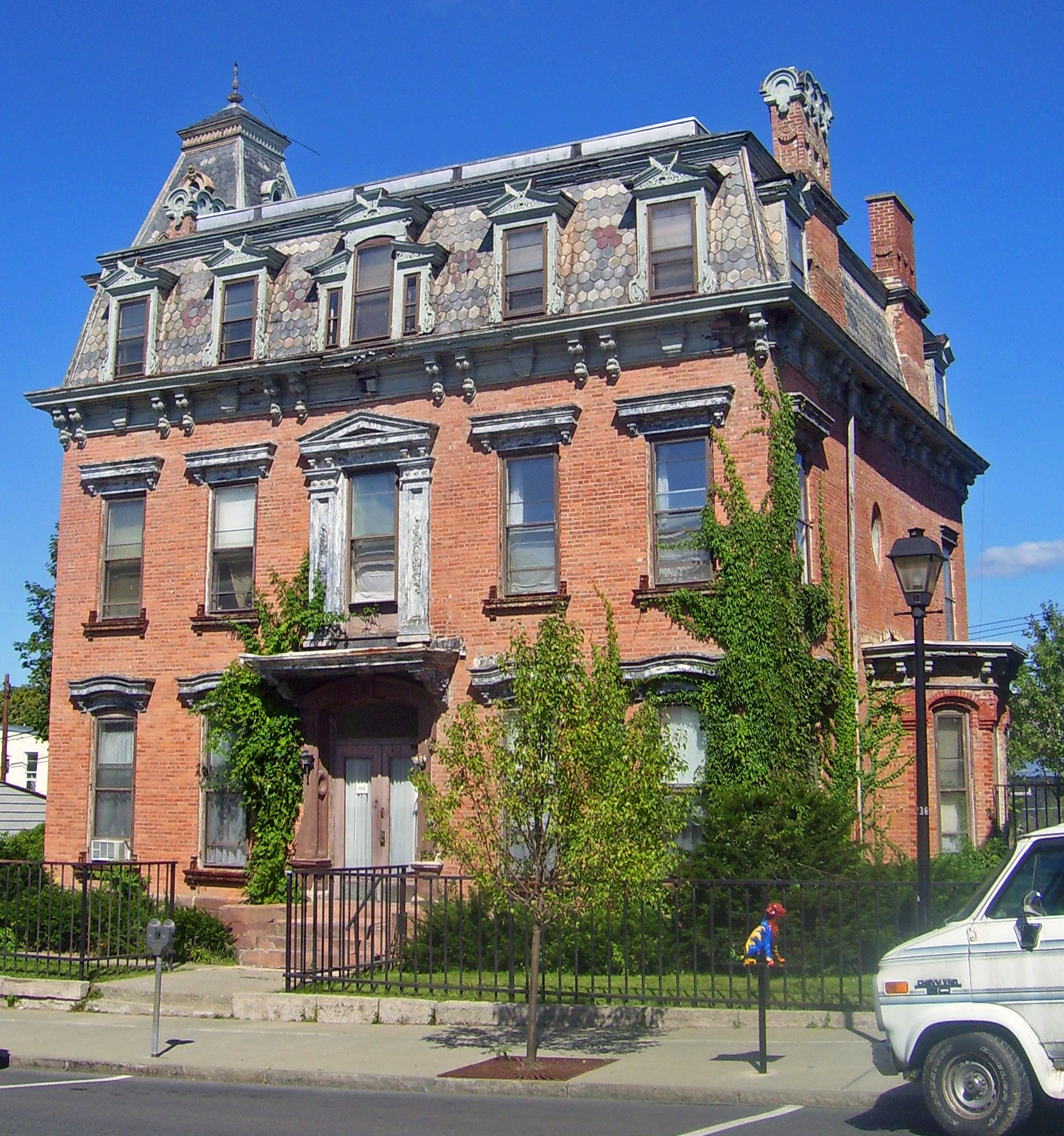
Cornelius H. Evans House

=== National Register of Historic Places ===
- Cornelius H. Evans House: This 1861 brick Second Empire house at 414-416 Warren Street was built by a local brewer, later twice elected mayor, and remains one of the city's best-known. In 1974 it became the first building in downtown Hudson to be listed on the Register.
- U.S. Post Office: This 1911 brick building at 402 Union Street is one of twelve in New York designed by James Knox Taylor, supervising architect for the Treasury Department in the early 20th century. He had begun to introduce classical ornamentation to the brick Colonial Revival style preferred for post offices, and designed for Hudson two Roman-inspired porticoes similar to those on the county courthouse across the square. In 1988 it was one of the many New York post offices listed on the Register from a statewide Multiple Property Submission.

=== Others ===
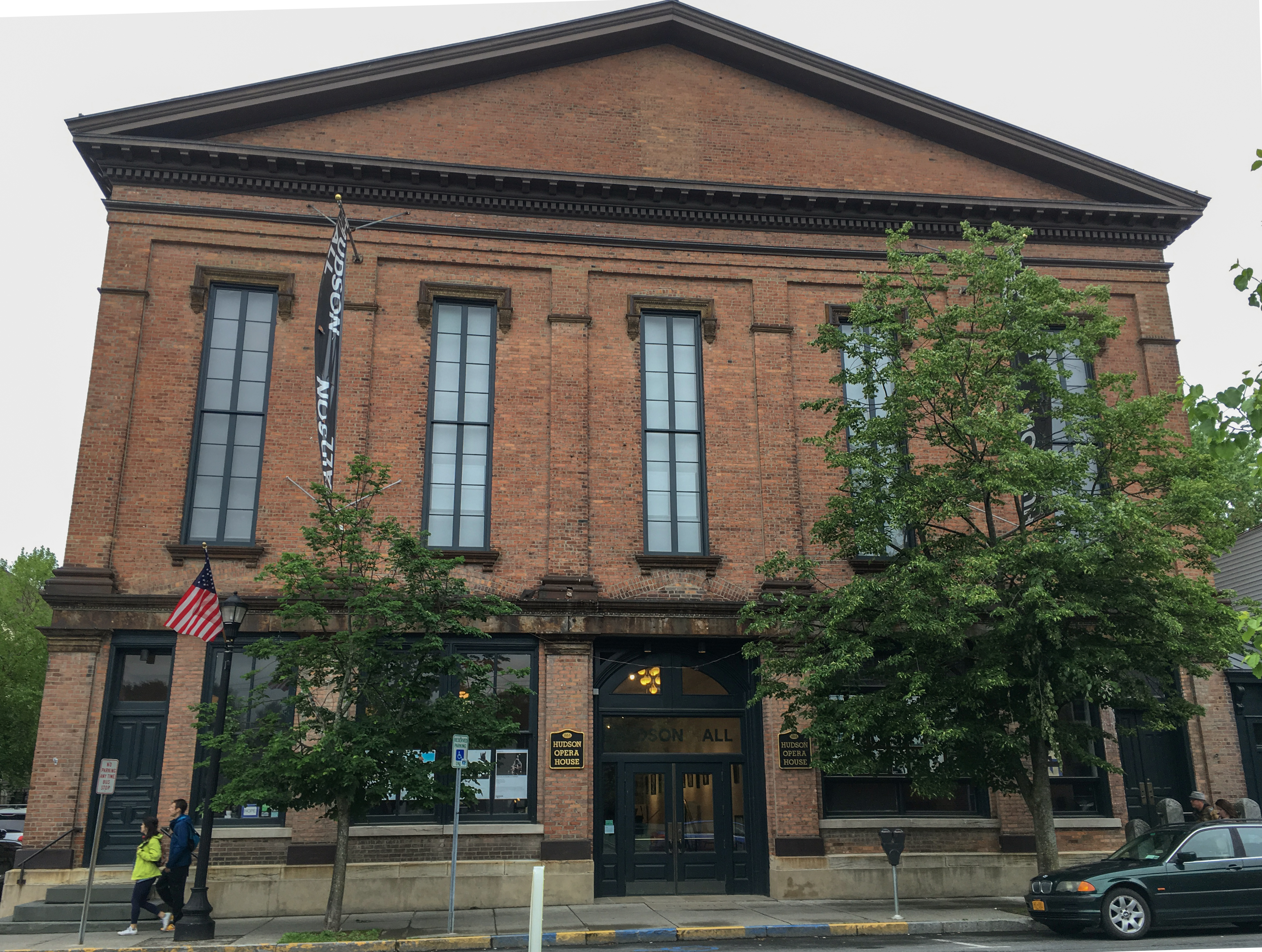
Old City Hall, now Hudson Hall, an arts organization and venue

- Columbia County Courthouse: A 1900 Classical Revival structure, designed by Warren & Wetmore, fronting on Courthouse Square from the south.
- Commercial building at 260 Warren Street: A rare surviving Greek Revival commercial building with stone post and lintels.
- House at 116 Union Street: This is one of the strongest examples of New England vernacular architecture from the city's early days, built around 1785.
- Old City Hall: This late (1854) Greek Revival brick building at 327 Warren Street was the most important public building in the district for many years.
- Robert Jenkins House: A brick Federal house of one of the city's early mayors at 113 Warren Street. This is one of the most mature examples of the style in Hudson.

== Preservation ==
In 2003 the city created a Historic Preservation Commission to review applications for new construction in the district, or exterior modifications to existing buildings that go beyond routine maintenance. It consists of seven members appointed by the mayor. At least one must be an architect, one a historian, and one live in the district. All must have an interest in preservation.

It meets once a month, or more often if its agenda requires. In addition to reviewing applications, it also considers city landmark designations.

== See also ==
- National Register of Historic Places listings in Columbia County, New York
