= Vanhoenacker =

Vanhoenacker is a surname. Notable people with the surname include:

- Charline Vanhoenacker (born 1977), Belgian journalist
- Marino Vanhoenacker (born 1976), Belgian triathlete
- Mark Vanhoenacker (born 1974), Belgian-American pilot and author
