= Cornelius H. Evans House =

Historic house in New York, United States

- U.S. National Register of Historic Places
- U.S. Historic district – Contributing property
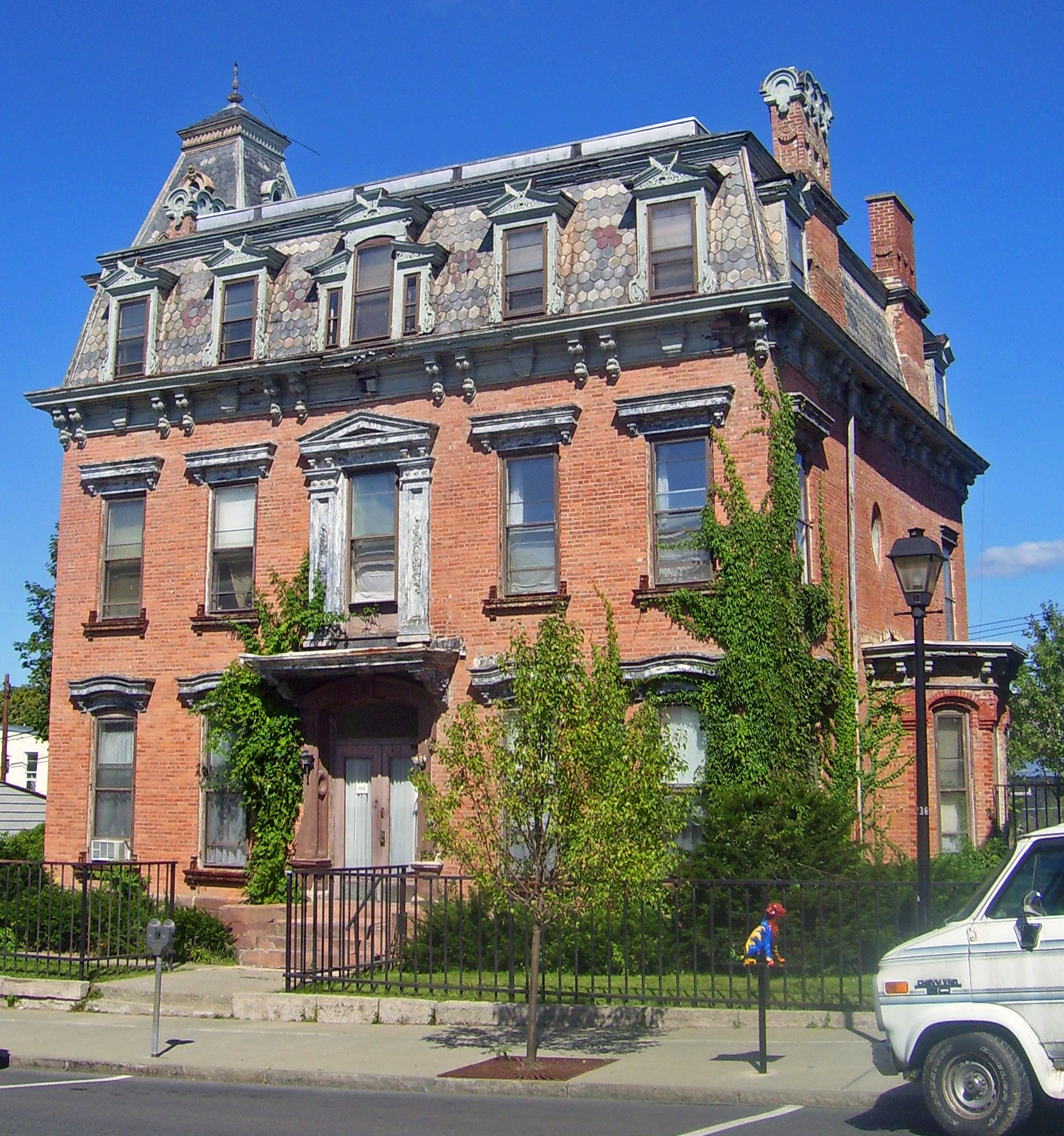
- South elevation and east profile, 2008

- Location within New York Location within the United States
- Location: Hudson, NY
- Coordinates: 42°15′3″N 73°47′17″W
- Area: 0.75 acres (3,000 m^{2})
- Built: 1861
- Part of: Hudson Historic District (ID74001226)
- NRHP reference No.: 74001226

Significant dates
- Added to NRHP: November 1, 1974
- Designated CP: October 21, 1985

The Cornelius H. Evans House is located on Warren Street in downtown Hudson, New York, United States. It is a brick house dating to the mid-19th century.

It was the home of Evans, a local brewer and businessman who served two terms as the city's mayor. His descendants remained in the house for 80 years. After being used as a synagogue and community center for short periods, it has returned to residential use. On November 1, 1974, it was listed on the National Register of Historic Places. It is also a contributing property to the Hudson Historic District.

== Building ==
The house is located on the north side of Warren Street, a few lots east of North Fourth Street. The level ground starts to slope up gently to the east. The neighborhood is urban and densely developed, with houses of a similar vintage on the north side of the street and mixed-use development opposite. There is a small front yard, set off by an iron fence, on the 0.75-acre (3,000 m^{2}) lot. Parking is in the rear.

Two and a half stories high and five bays wide, the house is faced in brick with sandstone window trim. A three-story tower is attached on the west side. At the roofline of the main block is a bracketed cornice. Above it is a mansard roof with gabled dormer windows shingled in fish-scale polychrome slate, pierced by two brick chimneys on the eastern side. The tower has a similarly treated pyramidal roof whose flat top is crowned with a finial.

The south (front) facade has a small wooden hood on its centrally located main entrance, reached via a small set of stone steps. Ivy climbs up the southeast corner almost to the roofline and on the west side of the main entrance. Above it the central window on the second story has a classical treatment, with two flanking pilasters and a dentiled pediment. The dormer window above it has two flanking smaller windows.

On the three-bay east side a bay window with narrow windows projects from the center of the first story. Above it is a round window. The roof has two dormers at the ends; the chimneys rise between them. The tower has circular and round-arched windows. Besides the tower the west profile is marked by an enclosed veranda.

The interior follows a center hall plan. The hallway has the main staircase and original wainscoting. Scrolled archways lead into the flanking spaces, and the floor is decorated in a raised-pattern wallpaper with a pattern resembling tooled leather. The molded woodwork, white marble mantels, stained glass, brass doorknobs and interior shutters are all original.

== History ==
Robert Evans, Cornelius's father, built in the house in 1861, when his son was 20. The older man had, a quarter-century earlier, bought a brewery in the city dating to 1796. Since then he had expanded it fourfold. The house was his statement of success and commitment to the city of Hudson. Its architect is unknown, but it shows the influence of James Renwick, who in the years before had pioneered the mansard-roofed buildings that evolved into the Second Empire style with the original Corcoran Gallery in Washington and, closer to Hudson, Main Building at Vassar College in Poughkeepsie. The Evans House applies those ideas to a smaller, residential structure.

The year before the house was built, Cornelius Evans had joined the family business as a clerk. Four years later, in 1865, he became a member of the corporation and, on his father's death in 1868, took over as its head. Under his leadership the company grew even more. Sales of its major product, Evans India Pale Ale, were so high that the company opened its own bottling plant next to the brewery in 1889. Within a year the bottling plant had to be doubled in size to keep up with demand.

Cornelius Evans succeeded his father as a civic leader as well, serving as a director of National Hudson City Bank, as Robert had. In the 1870s he was elected to two non-consecutive two-year terms as the city's mayor.

Cornelius Evans Jr. inherited the house when his father died in 1902. The brewery had to close in 1920 when Prohibition began. When Cornelius Jr. died in 1941, his son Roland sold the house out of the family. Five years later that owner sold it to Congregation Anshe Emeth, a local synagogue, for use as a house of worship and community center. In 1970 it was sold again and returned to residential use.

== See also ==
- National Register of Historic Places listings in Columbia County, New York
