= Elisha Williams House =

Historic house in New York, United States

- U.S. National Register of Historic Places
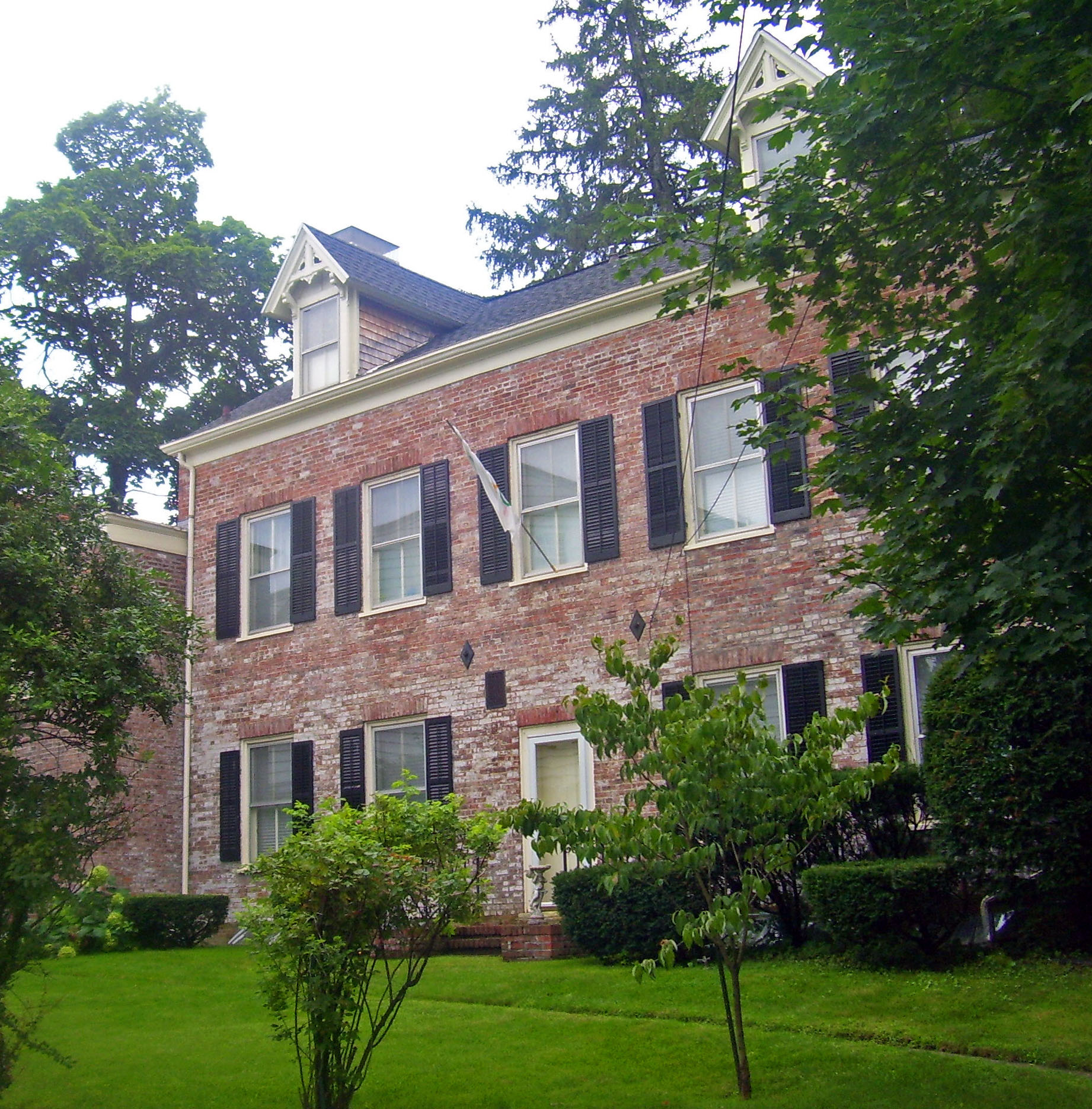
- North (rear) elevation, 2008

- Location within New York Location within the United States
- Interactive map showing the location of Elisha Williams House
- Location: Hudson, New York
- Coordinates: 42°14′49″N 73°46′17″W
- Built: ca. 1810
- Architectural style: Federal style
- MPS: Hudson MRA
- NRHP reference No.: 99001483
- Added to NRHP: 1999

The Elisha Williams House (also known as the Hawthorne House) is located on Aitken Avenue in the east corner of the city of Hudson, New York, United States. It is a brick Federal style building, different from other Hudson houses in that style, built around 1810. Some Victorian decorations were added later.

Williams, its original builder, was a lawyer and politician who was known nationwide as a gifted orator. The house was originally his estate, accounting for its unusual positioning within its neighborhood. In 1999 the house was listed on the National Register of Historic Places.

== Building ==
The house is on a slightly sloped 90-by-120-foot (27 by 37 m) lot two houses north of Green Street (NY 23B) on the east side of the street. It is a rectangular two-and-a-half-story five-bay common bond brick building on a stone foundation. The house is angled slightly within its so that its front facade faces more directly west than other houses along the street and the main entrance.

The gabled roof is shingled in wood and pierced by two brick chimneys south of the peak near the gable ends, and two gabled dormer windows with vergeboards on the north. A boxed cornice marks the roofline.

The windows have brick lintels and thin stone sills. The main entrance has a wood surround with two plain pilasters. A limestone cornerstone with "Hawthorne" on it is in the southwest corner. A two-story kitchen wing with an open porch on the south projects from the east side of the house.

Inside, the house follows a center-hall plan, with the main rooms on either side. The original layout has not been changed, and some of the finishings, such as the main hall's cherry staircase and newels and the parlor mantelpiece, are original. The second floor has had more modern additions, such as the bathrooms. The basement is unfinished.

== Aesthetics ==
The Williams House is not the only Federal style house in Hudson, but it is significantly different from the others, most of which are located in the opposite end of the city, near the Hudson River. Williams' house used common bond for the entire house, while the other houses did the front in Flemish bond. It also lacks the sidelight or elliptical fanlight commonly surrounding the main entrance of a Federal house.

These changes may reflect the different regional origins of their builders. The downtown Federal houses were built by the descendants of the city's founders, whalers who had emigrated from coastal areas of Massachusetts and Rhode Island. Williams, by contrast, was a native of inland Connecticut.

== History ==
Born in 1773 in Pomfret, Connecticut, Williams was orphaned as a child and taken into the care of a family friend. He read law under a judge in Litchfield, and was admitted to the New York bar in 1793, when he moved to the hamlet of Spencertown in what is today the Town of Austerlitz.

He was a persuasive speaker, and his fame as a lawyer quickly spread both inside and outside New York. After marrying his legal guardian's daughter in 1795, he moved to Hudson in 1799. Two years later he was elected to first of nine terms in the New York State Assembly on the Federalist Party line.

It is likely that Williams had the house built, but it is not known exactly when. An 1801 map of the city does not show it but may not have included it since at the time it was outside the city limits. An 1816 map, copied from the earlier version, indicates a brick house at the location. It is believed he either had the house built or bought it around 1810. At that time its front, the south elevation, faced Union Turnpike (today NY 66), the nearest road.

Williams' legal and political career continued to flourish despite the general decline of the Federalists after the War of 1812. At New York's 1821 constitutional convention, he argued forcefully for his party against the extension of the franchise to unpropertied men, but was defeated. He remained in office for the rest of the decade, but began to focus increasingly on other projects, such as the establishment of the village of Waterloo in Seneca County near the Finger Lakes. After leaving office, his health in decline, he spent much of his time there but was still a legal resident of Hudson when he sold the estate to local farmer Richard Atwell in 1832, a year before his death.

Atwell sold some of the land in 1835 but continued to live in the house. It became known as the Hawthorne House after the inscription on the cornerstone, whose origin is not clear. There is a Hawthorne Valley near Spencertown, and Williams may have brought the stone with him when he moved west. By 1856 Atwell's son-in-law Richard Aitkin owned the land. He would eventually have the longest tenure of any owner, and the street built next to the house in 1913 was named for him.
