= Rossman–Prospect Avenue Historic District =

Historic district in New York, United States

- U.S. National Register of Historic Places
- U.S. Historic district
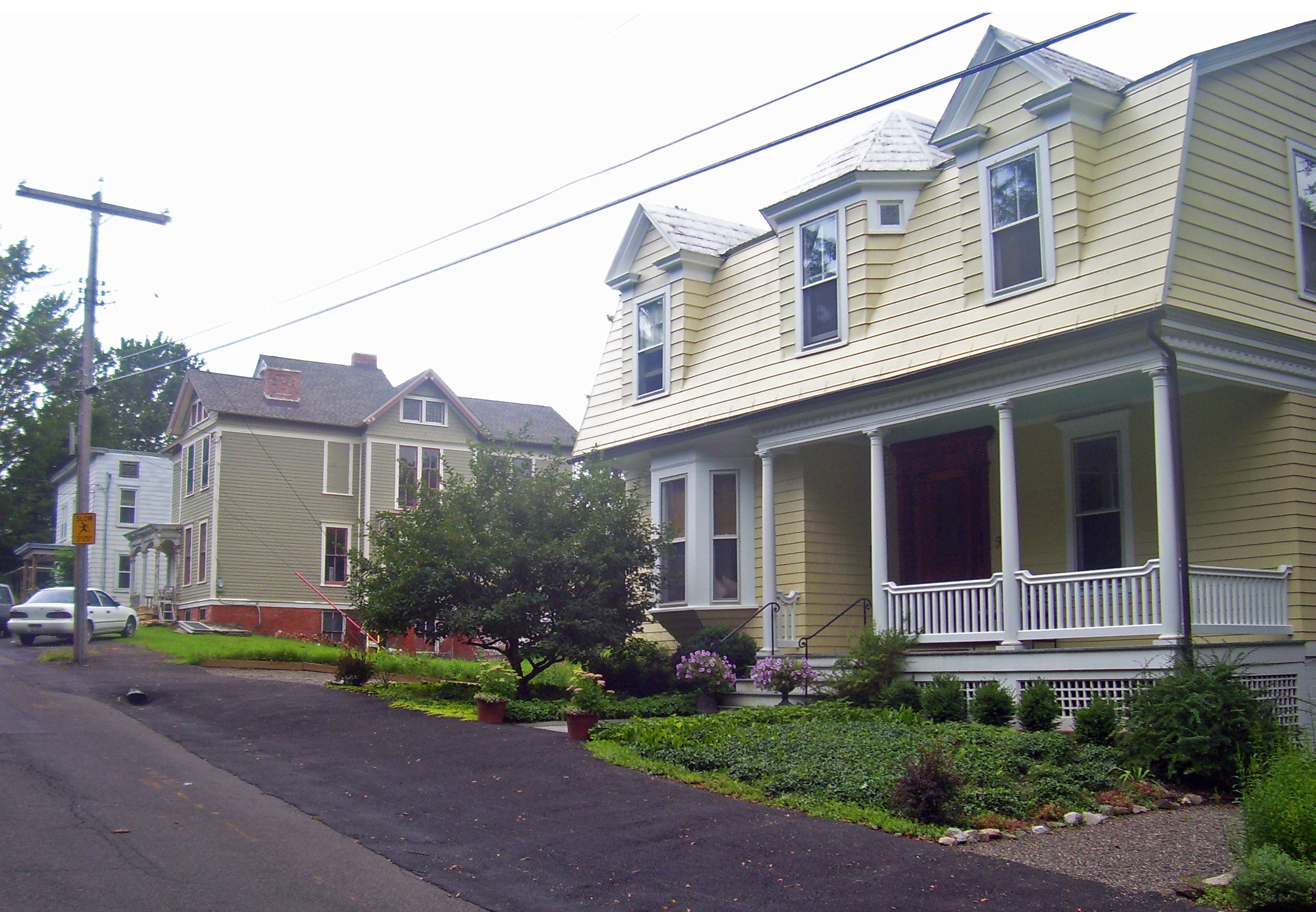
- Houses on Prospect Avenue, 2008

- Location within New York Location within the United States
- Location: Hudson, NY
- Coordinates: 42°14′43″N 73°46′44″W
- Area: 5 acres (2.0 ha)
- Built: late 19th-early 20th century
- Architectural style: Various late 19th and 20th-century styles
- MPS: Hudson MRA
- NRHP reference No.: 85003364
- Added to NRHP: 1985

The Rossman–Prospect Avenue Historic District is a small residential neighborhood located near the eastern end of the city of Hudson, New York, United States. Its houses were primarily built in the late 19th and early 20th centuries. It is the smaller of the city's two historic districts.

The area was developed when the city built an aqueduct through land owned by the Rossman family for a reservoir. It was the first planned residential subdivision in the city outside its large downtown grid plan. In 1985 it was listed on the National Register of Historic Places.

== Geography ==
The district is a five-acre (2 ha) area along the two streets it takes its name from. It is on the slopes of Academy Hill, sometimes called Prospect Hill, the city's highest at 420 feet (130 m). Houses on Rossman, which climbs the hill to a dead end near the reservoir, have a view over the city to the Hudson River and Catskill Escarpment to the southwest. To the north is Columbia Memorial Hospital and, beyond, the large Hudson Historic District. The reservoir and its wooded buffer lands are on the west and south. East of the district is the residential end of Warren Street, Hudson's main street, and US 9.

Its boundaries include some of the houses on the south side of Prospect east of Rossman, and both sides of Rossman up to where the houses end. There are 12 lots in total with 14 contributing properties. Two other garages are modern and non-contributing. The houses are in a variety of styles popular before and after the turn of the 20th century, such as Queen Anne, Colonial Revival, Craftsman Bungalow and Tudorbethan.

== History ==
In the middle of the 19th century the entire area was the estate of Allen Rossman, formerly county treasurer and a director of a local bank. Hudson was growing quickly during this time, and began experiencing frequent water shortages. The city government decided in 1874 to pump water from the river up to a reservoir behind Prospect Hill, and condemned a right-of-way for the aqueduct through Rossman's property.

He donated enough extra land for a street 50 feet (15 m) wide to be built atop the aqueduct, and began planting trees and subdividing the property into 13 lots. The first house, 11 Rossman Avenue, would not be built until 1887. Rossman died soon afterwards, and his descendants sold some of the other lots on the west side of the street during the 1890s. Many of these were Queen Anne Style, with restrained decoration similar to that found elsewhere in Hudson.

The lots on the east side were developed in the early 20th century. Many of these houses show the influence of the Arts and Crafts movement, particularly the bungalows. These were unusually sophisticated applications of the style, with Federal and Georgian-inspired detailing. The last two houses to be built in the district, 2 and 4 Rossman (the latter built as a residence for the hospital superintendent), were Tudorbethan-style English country houses, a mode not seen much elsewhere in Hudson.
