= United States Post Office (Hudson, New York) =

- U.S. Post Office
- U.S. National Register of Historic Places
- U.S. Historic district – Contributing property
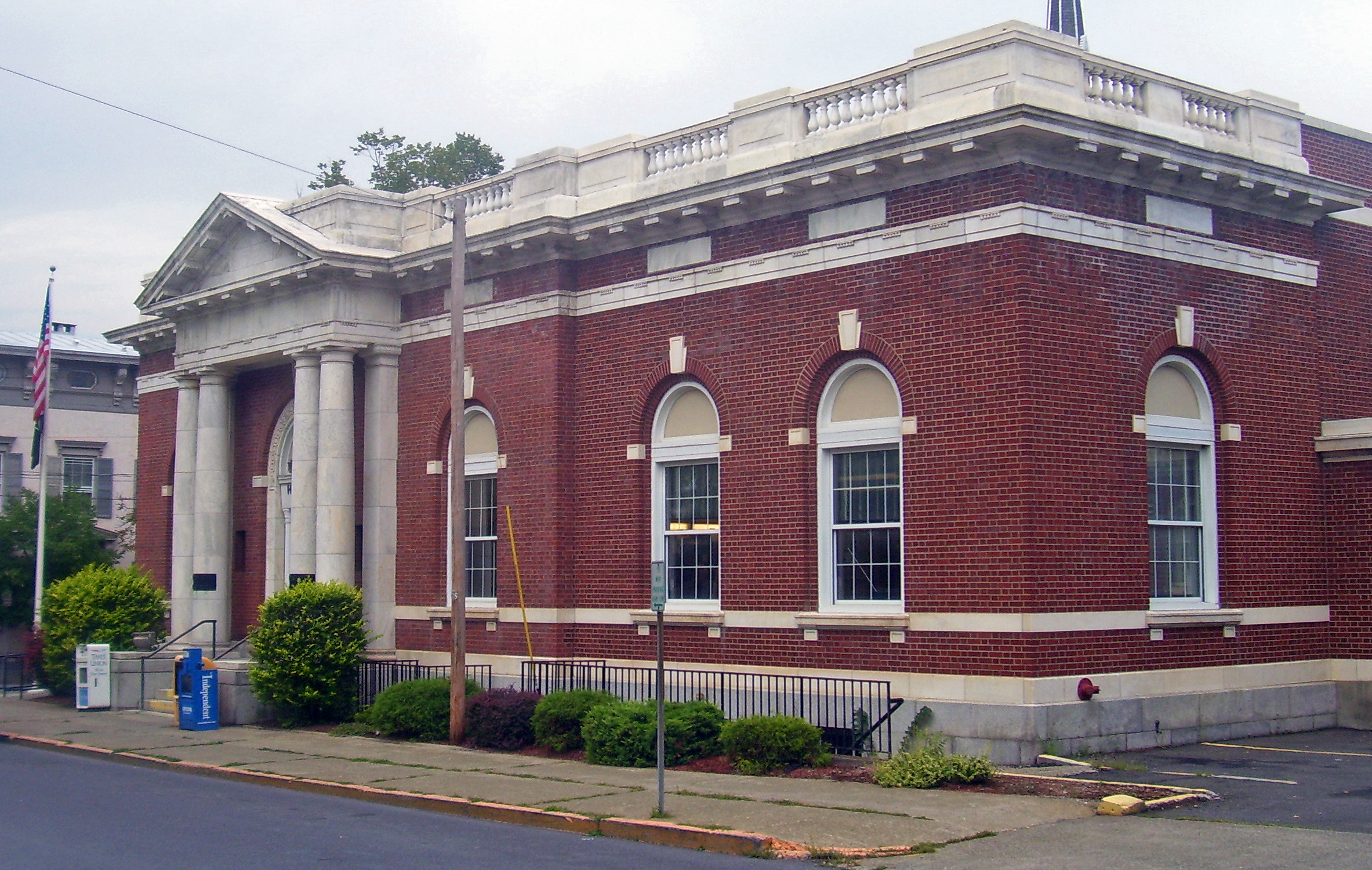
- South elevation and partial east profile, 2008

- Location within New York Location within the United States
- Interactive map showing the location for U.S. Post Office, Hudson
- Location: Hudson, NY
- Coordinates: 42°15′01″N 73°47′21″W
- Built: 1911
- Architect: James Knox Taylor
- Architectural style: Classical Revival, Colonial Revival
- Part of: Hudson Historic District
- MPS: U.S. Post Offices in New York State, 1858–1943, TR
- NRHP reference No.: 88002508
- Added to NRHP: 1988

The U.S. Post Office in Hudson, New York, United States, is located on Union Street at the corner of South Fourth Street, just across from the Columbia County courthouse. It serves the ZIP Code 12534, which covers the city of Hudson and surrounding areas of the Town of Greenport.

It was built from 1909 to 1911 in a combination of the Colonial and Classical Revival architectural styles. The latter was used for the front portico, which echoes that of the slightly older county courthouse across the street. During the 1930s it was expanded in an architecturally sympathetic fashion, and public art was added to its lobby. It is a contributing property to the Hudson Historic District, established in 1985. Three years later, in 1988, the post office was listed on the National Register of Historic Places in its own right, the only one in the county on the Register.

== Building ==
The post office is a seven-by-five-bay one-story building of brick laid in Flemish bond on a raised foundation faced in granite. It is capped with a low hipped roof; the arched windows are trimmed in white marble with a block at the springline. A two-bay wing projects from the east, along the south facade.

Along the west facade, on South Fourth, is a five-bay central pavilion with slightly recessed wings. The main entrance is flanked by fluted floral-topped wooden pilasters that support an entablature with similarly foliated cornice. Above it a plain frieze reads "Hudson, N.Y., 12534." The entire entry is surrounded by a large arch with a decorated marble surround, featuring rosettes, an archivolt with interlocking wooden circles. It is topped by an architrave with carved guttae and a deep cornice with modillions. Atop it is a balustraded parapet.

The south facade has a shallow single-bay portico with paired Doric columns supporting an entablature with triglyphs and modillioned pediment. Its entrance is similar to the other facade. Granite steps lead up from the street.

Inside, the L-shaped lobby can be entered from both directions. From the south, a wooden vestibule opens onto a space with terrazzo floors bordered by white marble and inset panels, marble wainscoting and high ceiling. The plaster walls are divided by engaged fluted wooden pilasters topped by egg-and-dart–molded capitals. Above them is a cornice with similar molding, with a five-paneled cast stone relief, "The History of Transportation", above the door to the postmaster's office.

The east portion of the lobby is less detailed. Its vestibule's inner door has a similar treatment as the western exterior entrance. Bronze customer tables are original.

== History ==
At the time of Hudson's incorporation in 1785, mail to and from the community was handled by the post office in nearby Claverack, then the county seat. The village gained its own post office in 1793, run from a store on Warren Street. Later it was in another store on the same street.

This was the building still in use in 1906 when Congress allocated $75,000 ($2.69 million in contemporary dollars) for the construction of a new post office opposite the recently constructed courthouse and near the city's other public buildings. Two years later the site was purchased for $15,000.

External image
- Closeup of portico entablature on Columbia County courthouse

James Knox Taylor, Supervising Architect of the Treasury, designed the building, one of many post offices in New York he is responsible for. He had begun introducing classical and Renaissance elements into post office design, to express a return to the democratic ideals of the Founders. In Hudson, he put two classically inspired porticos on a basic Colonial Revival brick main block. They shared many details, such as the paired columns, modillion blocks and parapet, with the recently built Warren and Wetmore-designed county courthouse across the square.

Construction was supposed to have been finished by August 1910 but instead it was not done until almost a year and a half later, in December 1911, at a cost of $58,576 ($2.1 million in contemporary dollars). In the early 1930s an addition was authorized due to local growth. It required the purchase of more land to the east and the demolition of the house on it. In 1938 it was completed for $99,000 ($2.26 million in contemporary dollars). During that construction, the Vincent Glinsky "Evolution of Transportation" sculpture was added to the lobby through the Treasury Relief Art Project.

During this work some of the original windows and vents were bricked over, and the current bronze handrail on the outdoor steps added. A quarter-century later, in 1963, when the outdoor steps were replaced, the original lampposts were removed as well. There have been no other significant changes to the building other than those.
