= Henry A. and Evanlina Dubois House =

Historic house in New York, United States

- Henry A. Dubois and Evanlina House
- U.S. National Register of Historic Places
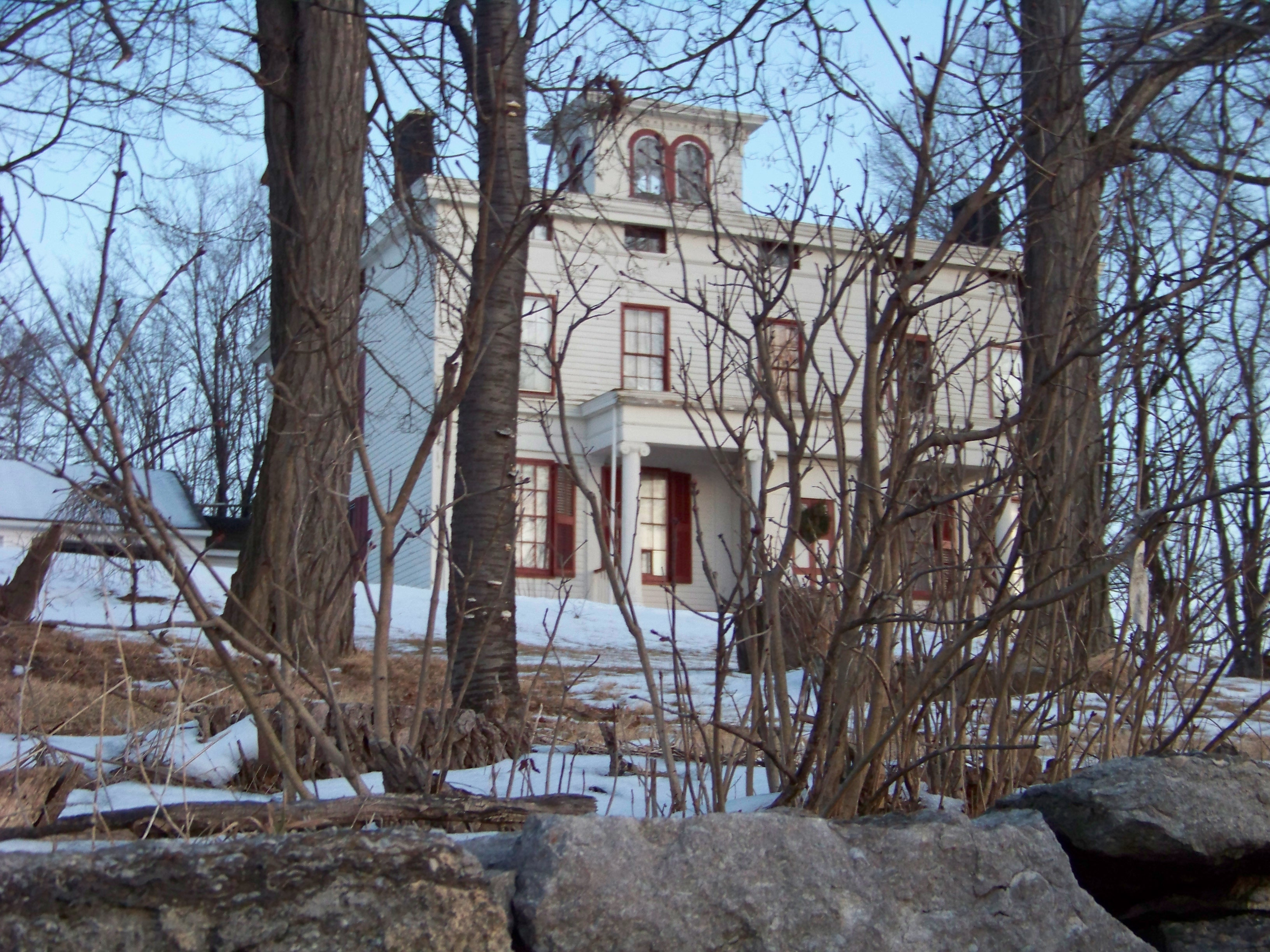
- Henry A. and Evanlina Dubois House, January 2010

- Location within New York Location within the United States
- Nearest city: Hudson, New York
- Coordinates: 42°14′23″N 73°46′53″W
- Area: 5.3 acres (2.1 ha)
- Built: 1840
- Architectural style: Greek Revival
- NRHP reference No.: 04001340
- Added to NRHP: December 6, 2004

Henry A. Dubois and Evanlina House is a historic home located at Hudson in Columbia County, New York. It was built about 1840 and is a 2 1/2-story, wood-frame dwelling with a stone-and-brick foundation and hipped roof in the Greek Revival style. The front facade features a one-story, three-bay open central porch with four Ionic order columns and a deep entablature. A Victorian wood cupola was added to the roof about 1870. Also on the property is an L-shaped wood-frame barn dated to the 1860s.

It was added to the National Register of Historic Places in 2004.
