= Hudson, New York =

Hudson
- City
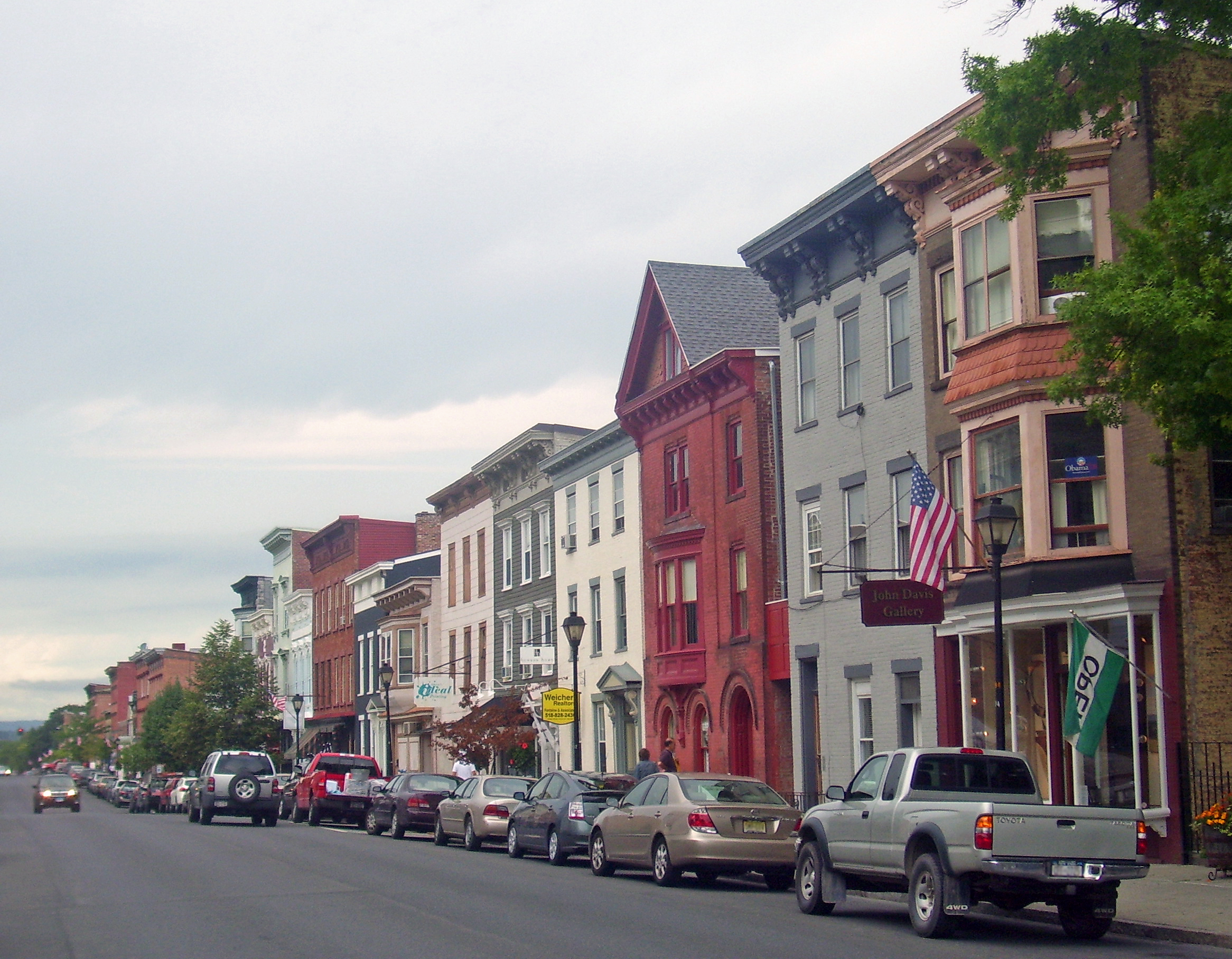
- Warren Street in Hudson
- Etymology: From Henry Hudson
- Nickname: The Friendly City
- Location of Hudson, New York

- Location of New York in the United States
- Coordinates: 42°15′0″N 73°47′23″W
- Country: United States
- State: (New York (state)) New York
- County: Columbia
- Founded: Incorporated

Government
  - Mayor: Joseph Ferris (D) Common Council: President: Margaret Morris (D); Ward 1: Art Frick (D)Margaret Morris (D); Ward 2: Mohammed Rony (D); Dewan Sarowar (D); Ward 3: Ryan Wallace (D); Amber Harris (D); Ward 4: Malachi Walker (D); Theo Anthony (D); Ward 5: Dominic Merante (D); Vicky Daskaloudi (D)

Area
  - Total: 2.33 sq mi (6.03 km^{2})
  - Land: 2.16 sq mi (5.59 km^{2})
  - Water: 0.17 sq mi (0.45 km^{2})
- Elevation: 100 ft (30 m)
- Highest elevation: 420 ft (130 m)

Population (2020)
  - Total: 5,894
  - Density: 2,731/sq mi (1,054.6/km^{2})
- Time zone: UTC-5 (Eastern (EST))
  - Summer (DST): UTC-4 (EDT)
- ZIP Code: 12534
- Area codes: 518
- FIPS code: 36-021-35969
- FIPS code: 36-35969
- GNIS feature ID: 0953386
- Wikimedia Commons: Hudson, New York
- Website: www.cityofhudson.org

Hudson is a city in and the county seat of Columbia County, New York, United States. At the 2020 census, it had a population of 5,894. On the east side of the Hudson River, 120 miles (190 km) from the Atlantic Ocean, it was named after the river's explorer, Henry Hudson.

Often called the "Brooklyn of Upstate New York", Hudson is a tourist destination known for its antique shops and boutiques.

== History ==
The Native Mahican people had occupied this territory for hundreds of years before Dutch colonists began to settle here in the 17th century, calling it "Claverack Landing" (as it was later known in English). In 1662, some of the Dutch bought this area of land from the Mahican. Later it was part of the Town of Claverack established by English colonists.

In 1783, after the American Revolution, the area was settled largely by Quaker whalers and merchants hailing primarily from the New England islands of Nantucket and Martha's Vineyard in Massachusetts, and Providence, Rhode Island, led by Thomas and Seth Jenkins. They capitalized on Hudson being at the head of navigation on the Hudson River and developed it as a busy port. Hudson was chartered as a city in 1785. The self-described "Proprietors" laid out a city grid. By 1786, the city had several fine wharves, warehouses, a spermaceti-works and fifteen hundred residents.

In 1794 John Alsop, of the New York City shipping and commission agents Alsop & Hicks, relocated to Hudson for a brief time. He continued to maintain a part interest in the New York firm and attracted customers from the Hudson area, including: Thomas Jenkins & Sons, Seth Jenkins, and the Paddock family, among others. After Alsop's death in November 1794, his partner, Isaac Hicks, began to focus more of his efforts toward increasing his sale of whale products-especially oil and spermaceti candles. Hudson grew rapidly as an active port and came within one vote of being named by the state legislature as the capital of New York state. It lost to Albany, an historic center of Dutch and English colonial trade from the 17th century.

Hudson grew rapidly, and by 1790 was the 24th-largest city in the United States, then limited to east of the Allegheny Mountains. In 1820, it had a population of 5,310 and ranked as the fourth-largest city in the state of New York, after New York City, Albany, and Brooklyn.

The renowned case of People v. Croswell began in Hudson when Harry Croswell published on September 9, 1802, an attack on President Thomas Jefferson in the Federalist paper The Wasp. The state's Democratic-Republican attorney General Ambrose Spencer indicted Croswell for seditious libel. The case eventually wound up with Alexander Hamilton defending Crosswell before the New York Supreme court in Albany in 1804. Crosswell lost, apparently due to the influence of anti-Federalist Justice Morgan Lewis. However, enough state assemblymen had observed the trial that in 1805 they changed the state law on libel.

Construction of the Erie Canal in 1824 drew development west in the state, stimulating development of cities related to Great Lakes trade, such as Rochester and Buffalo. The Hudson River continued to be important to commerce, as it carried lumber and other products from the Midwest to New York and downriver markets.

During the 19th century, considerable industry was developed in Hudson, and the city became known as a factory town. It attracted new waves of immigrants and migrants to industrial jobs. Wealthy factory owners and merchants built fine houses in the Victorian period.

Hudson obtained a new charter in 1895. It reached its peak of population in 1930, with 12,337 residents.

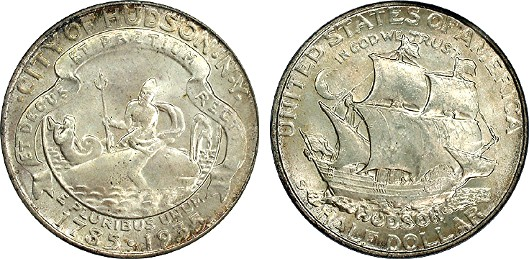
The Hudson sesquicentennial commemorative half dollar was issued in 1935. It had one of the smallest mintages for a type issued by the US Mint.

In 1935, to celebrate the sesquicentennial of the city, the United States Mint issued the Hudson Half Dollar. The coin is one of the rarest ever minted by the United States Government, as only 10,008 coins were struck. On the front of the coin is an image of Henry Hudson's ship the Half Moon, and on the reverse is the seal of the city. Local legend has it that coin was minted on direct order of President Franklin Delano Roosevelt to thank the Hudson City Democratic Committee for being the first to endorse him for state senator and governor.

In the late 19th and first half of the 20th century, Hudson became notorious as a center of vice, especially gambling and prostitution. The former Diamond Street is today Columbia Street. At the peak of the vice industry, Hudson boasted more than 50 bars. These rackets were mostly broken up in 1951, after surprise raids of Hudson brothels by New York state troopers, under orders from Governor Thomas E. Dewey, netted several local policemen, among other customers.

The first written mention of 'cocktail' as a beverage appeared in The Farmers Cabinet, 1803, in the United States. The first definition of a cocktail as an alcoholic beverage appeared three years later in The Balance and Columbian Repository (Hudson, New York) May 13, 1806. Traditionally, cocktail ingredients included spirits, sugar, water and bitters; however, this definition evolved throughout the 1800s to include the addition of a liqueur.

A land-use conflict began in 1998 when St. Lawrence Cement proposed to build a 1,800-acre (7.3 km^{2}) coal-fired cement manufacturing plant in Hudson and Greenport. Supporters said the project would create jobs and stimulate economic growth. Grassroots opponents, led for 7 years by the local group Friends of Hudson, said the proposed project would only shift jobs from one location to another, would violate state environmental regulations and would adversely affect the river, shoreline, and related habitats. The project was withdrawn after New York Secretary of State Randy Daniels determined the company's plans were inconsistent with New York State's 24 coastal policies. Nearly 14,000 public comments were received by the State's Division of Coastal Resources (87% of them opposed to the project), a record for that agency.

== Geography ==
According to the United States Census Bureau, the city has a total area of 2.3 square miles (6.0 km^{2}), of which 2.2 square miles (5.6 km^{2}) is land and 0.15 square miles (0.4 km^{2}), or 7.38%, is water.

Hudson is located 120 miles (190 km) from New York Harbor, at the head of navigation on the Hudson River, on what originally was a spit of land jutting into the Hudson River between the South Bay and North Bay. Both bays have been largely filled in. Across the Hudson River lies the town of Athens in Greene County; a ferry connected the two municipalities during much of the 19th century. Between them lies Middle Ground Flats, a former sandbar that grew due to both natural silting and also from dumping the spoils of dredging; today it is inhabited by deer and a few occupants of quasi-legal summer shanties. The Town of Greenport borders the other three sides of the city.

== Demographics ==
Historical population
Census	Pop.	Note	%±
1790	2,584		—
1800	3,664		41.8%
1810	4,048		10.5%
1820	5,310		31.2%
1830	5,392		1.5%
1840	5,672		5.2%
1850	6,286		10.8%
1860	7,187		14.3%
1870	8,615		19.9%
1880	8,670		0.6%
1890	9,970		15.0%
1900	9,528		−4.4%
1910	11,417		19.8%
1920	11,745		2.9%
1930	12,337		5.0%
1940	11,517		−6.6%
1950	11,629		1.0%
1960	11,075		−4.8%
1970	8,940		−19.3%
1980	7,986		−10.7%
1990	8,034		0.6%
2000	7,524		−6.3%
2010	6,713		−10.8%
2020	5,894		−12.2%
U.S. Decennial Census

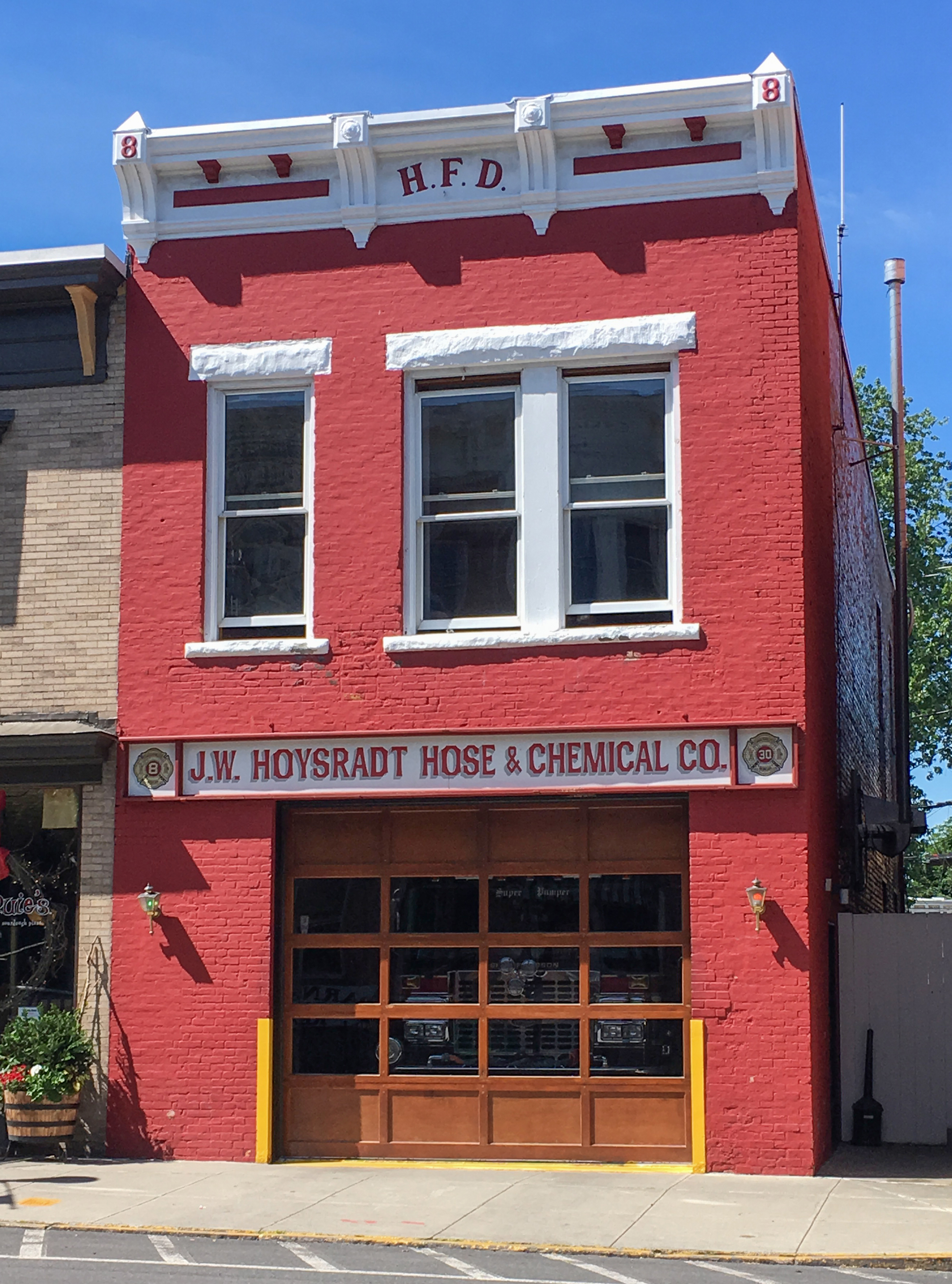
Fire station in Hudson

=== 2020 census ===
As of the 2020 census, Hudson had a population of 5,894. The median age was 41.3 years. 18.8% of residents were under the age of 18 and 18.8% of residents were 65 years of age or older. For every 100 females there were 96.4 males, and for every 100 females age 18 and over there were 94.2 males age 18 and over.

99.6% of residents lived in urban areas, while 0.4% lived in rural areas.

There were 2,731 households in Hudson, of which 22.2% had children under the age of 18 living in them. Of all households, 26.1% were married-couple households, 26.1% were households with a male householder and no spouse or partner present, and 39.7% were households with a female householder and no spouse or partner present. About 44.4% of all households were made up of individuals and 16.8% had someone living alone who was 65 years of age or older.

There were 3,433 housing units, of which 20.4% were vacant. The homeowner vacancy rate was 3.8% and the rental vacancy rate was 9.0%.

Racial composition as of the 2020 census
Race	Number	Percent
White	3,321	56.3%
Black or African American	1,023	17.4%
American Indian and Alaska Native	30	0.5%
Asian	669	11.4%
Native Hawaiian and Other Pacific Islander	8	0.1%
Some other race	290	4.9%
Two or more races	553	9.4%
Hispanic or Latino (of any race)	613	10.4%

=== 2010 census ===
As of the census of 2010, there were 6,713 people, 2,766 households, and 1,368 families residing in the city. These numbers include the approximately 360 residents of the local Hudson Correctional Facility.

The population density was 3,110.8 inhabitants per square mile (1,201.1/km^{2}). The racial makeup of the city was 59.0% (55.5% Non-Hispanic) White, 25.0% African American, 7.1% Asian, 0.4% Native American, 0.1% Pacific Islander, and 5.2% from two or more races. Hispanic or Latino of any race were 8.2% of the population.

There were 2,766 households, out of which 25.2% had children under the age of 18 living with them, 24.6% were married couples living together, 19.4% had a female householder with no husband present, and 50.5% were non-families. 40.9% of all households were made up of individuals, and 13.6% had someone living alone who was 65 years of age or older. The average household size was 2.24 and the average family size was 3.09.

Age of residents included 22.5% under the age of 18, 9.8% from 18 to 24, 27.3% from 25 to 44, 27.0% from 45 to 64, and 13.5% who were 65 years of age or older. The median age was 37.5 years. For every 100 females, there were 106.7 males. For every 100 females age 18 and over, there were 105.6 males.

The median income for a household in the city was $35,117, and the median income for a family was $37,400. Males had a median income of $26,274 versus $22,598 for females. The per capita income for the city was $22,353. About 23.0% of families and 23.2% of the population were below the poverty line, including 31.8% of those under age 18 and 19.1% of those age 65 or over.

== Economy ==
After a steep economic decline in the 1960s and '70s, following the loss of jobs due to restructuring in the manufacturing sector, the city has undergone a significant revival. The economy has shifted to one based on tourism, services and related retail.

Attracted by its quality architecture, a group of antiques dealers opened shops on the city's main thoroughfare, Warren Street, in the mid-1980s. Among these were the Hudson Antiques Center, founded by Alain Pioton, and the English Antiques Center. In the early 21st century, the city has nearly seventy shops now, represented by the Hudson Antiques Dealers Association (HADA). The business revival stimulated tourism and attracted residents, some taking second homes in the city. It has become known for its active arts scene, restaurants, art galleries and nightlife, in addition to the antique shops.

Hudson (2016) has a higher concentration of independent artists than only two other U.S. counties — Kings County, known worldwide as Brooklyn, and Taos County, N.M., according to Captivate: The Capital Region's Creative Economy, a study released in 2014 by the Regional Alliance for the Creative Economy.

== Arts and culture ==
In 2010, Hudson hosted its first LGBTQ pride parade, attended by several hundred people. Lil' Deb's Oasis is a restaurant in the city that hosts queer events and is an LGBTQ gathering space.

=== Attractions ===
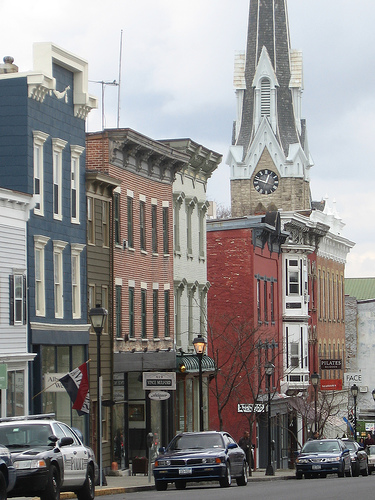
Warren Street in downtown Hudson

Hudson is home to the Firemen's Association of the State of New York (FASNY) Museum of Firefighting, one of the largest fire service-centered museums in the world. It is on the grounds of the FASNY Firemen's home, the first nursing home for firemen in the country.

The Hudson Music Festival was an annual event established in 2011 and was New York's largest free music festival. The fourth annual Hudson Music Festival took place August 8, 9 & 10, 2014 and showcased 100 acts.

Hudson Hall, an arts venue and organization, is located on Warren Street in the center of the city. It is New York's oldest operating theater.

Time & Space Limited, a not-for-profit arts organization serves the City of Hudson and the Hudson River Valley Region. It shows a wide selection of independent movies.

Olde York Farm is a woman-owned and family-operated distillery sourcing Hudson Valley foraged and farmed ingredients to make seasonal batch spirits.

=== National Register of Historic Properties listings ===
With hundreds of properties listed or eligible to be listed in the State and National registers of historic places, Hudson has been called the "finest dictionary of American architecture in New York State". The vast majority of properties listed within the Hudson Historic District are considered to be contributing, attesting to their quality.

These properties include the Dr. Oliver Bronson House and Estate and Dr. Oliver Bronson House and Stables (both for Dr. Oliver Bronson), Henry A. and Evanlina Dubois House, Cornelius H. Evans House, Front Street-Parade Hill-Lower Warren Street Historic District, Houses at 37–47 North Fifth Street, Hudson Almshouse, Hudson Historic District, Hudson/Athens Lighthouse, Rossman-Prospect Avenue Historic District, United States Post Office, William Henry Ludlow House, Elisha Williams House, Oliver Wiswall House, and Van Salsbergen House.

== Government ==
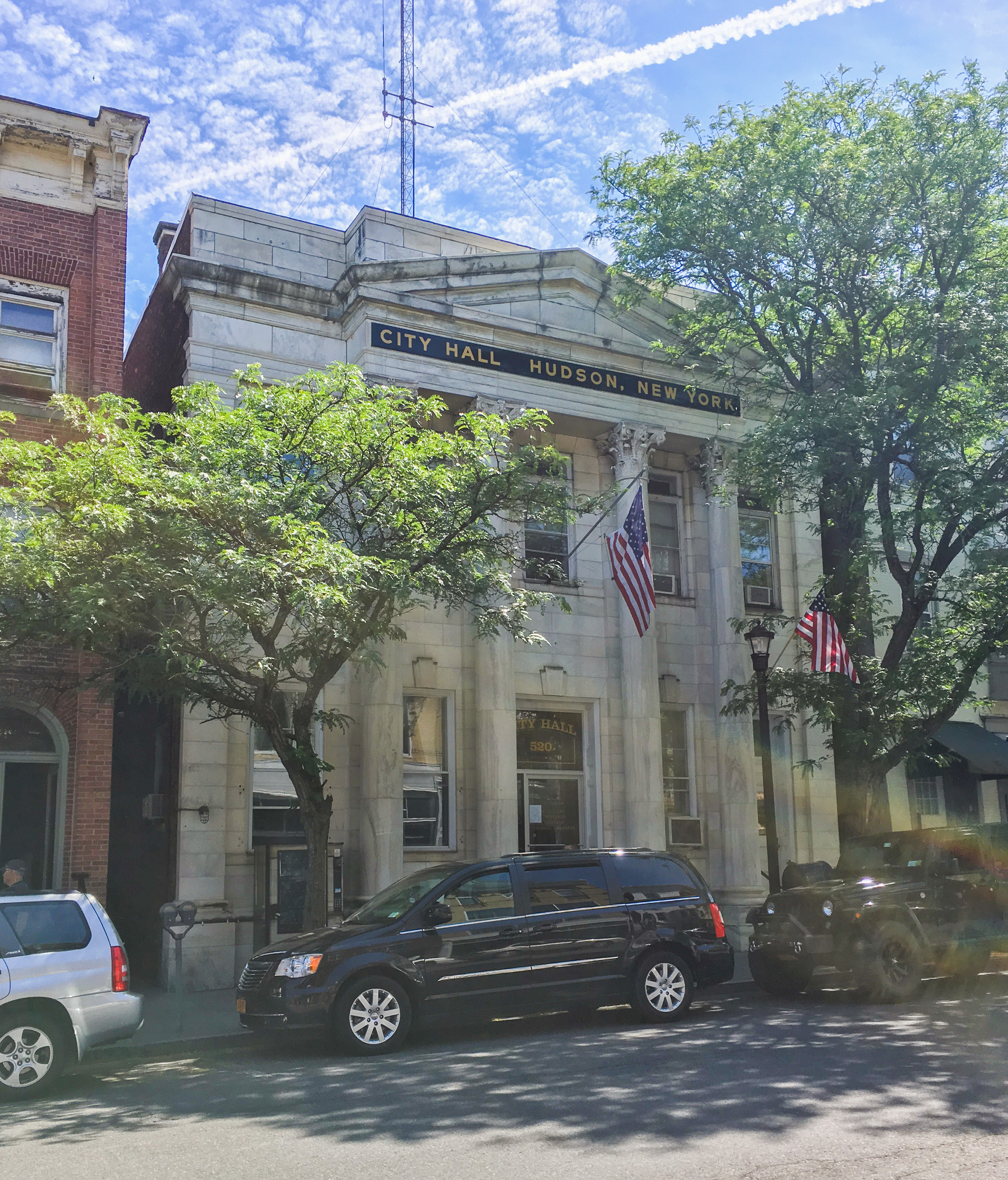
Hudson City Hall

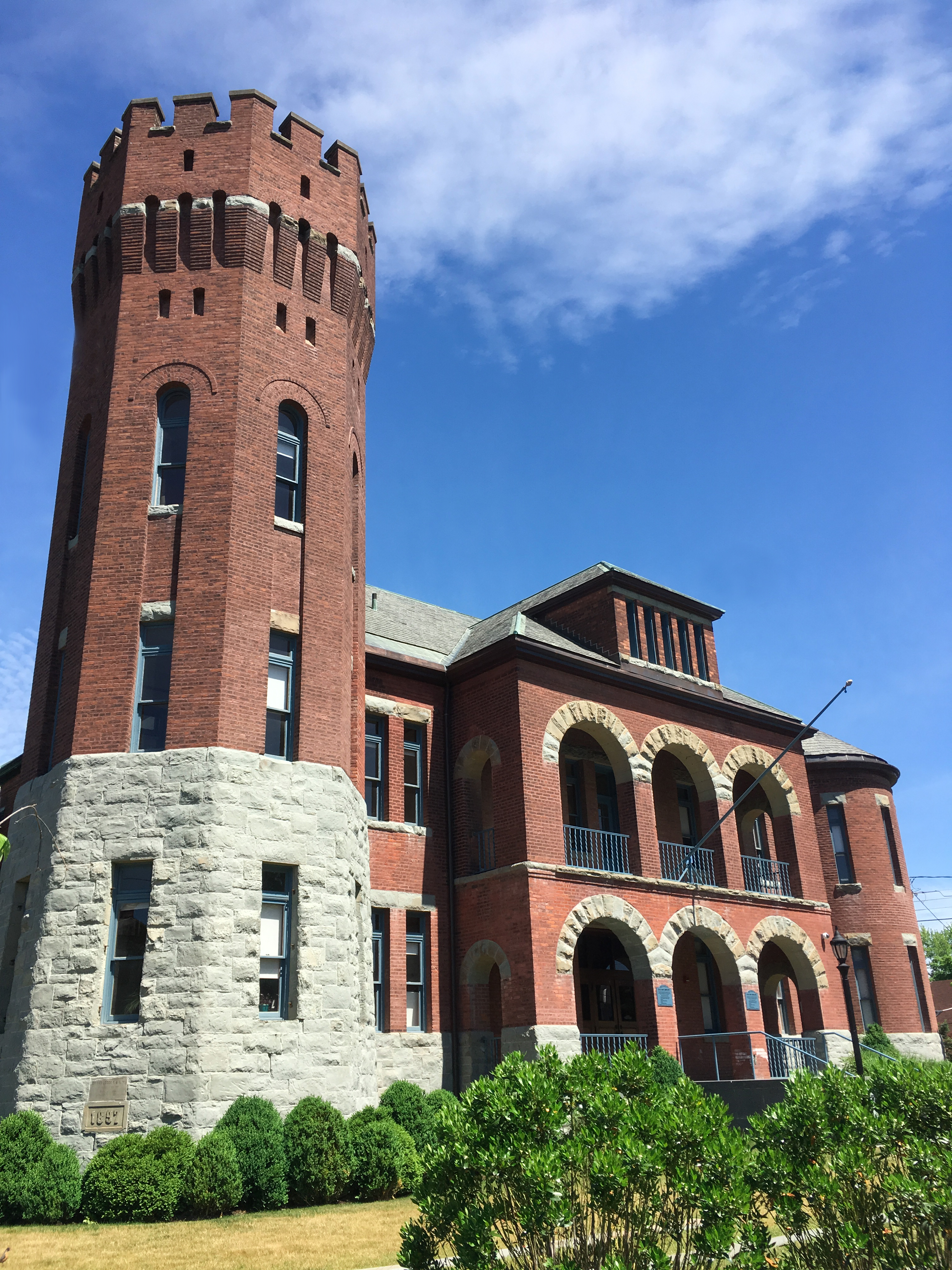
Hudson Area Library

The city has a mayor-council form of elected government. Since the 1990s, nine mayors have served: William Allen, Dolly Allen, Richard Scalera, Kenneth Cranna, Richard Tracy, William Hallenbeck, Tiffany Martin Hamilton, Rick Rector, and Kamal Johnson. This period has been marked by unusual levels of friction between elected officials and residents, as the demographics and economics of the city have shifted. The Common Council consists of ten members elected from five districts, and a Council President elected citywide, as is the Treasurer.

== Schools ==
The City is covered by the Hudson City School District. Schools include Montgomery C. Smith Elementary School, Hudson Junior High School, and Hudson High School.

== Media ==
- The Register Star
- Modern Farmer

Movies filmed in Hudson include:

- Odds Against Tomorrow (1959), starring Harry Belafonte and Robert Ryan
- Ironweed (1987), starring Jack Nicholson and Meryl Streep
- Nobody's Fool (1994), starring Paul Newman.
- A Bread Factory (2018), directed by Patrick Wang

== Infrastructure ==
=== Transportation ===
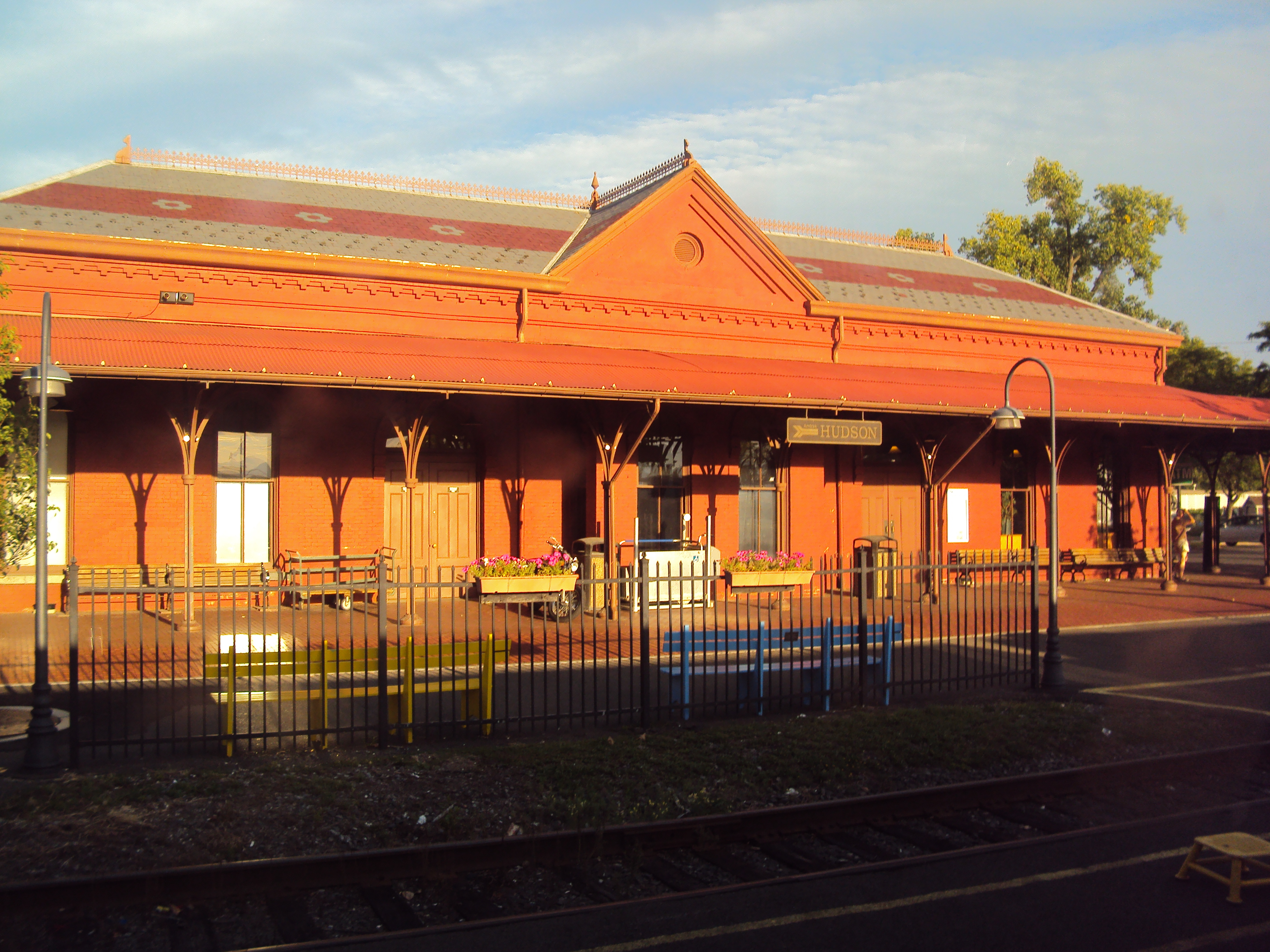
Amtrak's Hudson station

Amtrak, the national passenger rail system, provides service to Hudson via the Hudson station.

Columbia County Public Transportation provides local service and commuter service to Albany.

Greene County Transit's route 711 connects Hudson to Catskill, across the Hudson River in Greene County.

Hudson Ferry Company provides ferry service across the Hudson River to Athens, also in Greene County.

== Notable people ==
- Marina Abramović, performance artist
- Robert Adams, American sailor and explorer
- John Ashbery, New York State poet laureate
- Melissa Auf der Maur, musician (The Smashing Pumpkins, Hole) and owner of Basilica Hudson, an arts and performance venue
- Rashad Barksdale, New York Giants cornerback
- Jonah Bokaer, choreographer, media artist
- J. D. Cannon, actor
- Nicolas Carone, artist
- Dave Cole, Sculptor
- Rich Conaty (1954–2016), radio disc jockey
- John Corapi, Catholic priest and whistleblower, born and grew up in Hudson
- Lynn Davis, photographer
- Tom Davis, comedian
- Alice Mary Dowd (1855–1943), educator, author
- Sarah Stoddard Eddy (1831–1904), reformer and clubwoman
- George C. Ewing, politician, and founder of Holyoke, Massachusetts
- Joel Flaum, Judge on the 7th Circuit Court of Appeals
- Nancy Fuller, host of Food Network's Farmhouse Rules
- Kevin Geary (born 1952), English portrait and abstract artist
- Sanford Robinson Gifford, artist of the Hudson River School of landscape painters, born and raised in Hudson.
- L. Douglas Garrison (1930-1985), Hall of Fame auto racing driver
- Kirsten Gillibrand, politician, lawyer, and member of the United States Senate
- Robert J. Gorlin (1923–2006), oral pathologist and clinical geneticist, was born in Hudson
- Bibbe Hansen, performance artist, actress, musician
- Gaby Hofmann, actress
- Hezekiah Lord Hosmer, first chief justice of the Montana Territory Supreme Court
- Joshua Lee, US congressman
- John B. Longley (1830–1892), lawyer and politician
- Tyler Lydon, basketball player, first-round selection in 2017 NBA draft
- Harold Macy, microbiologist
- Sam J. Miller, science fiction author
- Meshell Ndegeocello, musician
- Benjamin Moore Norman, author and book dealer
- Almerin C. O'Hara, US Army major general
- Elvis Perkins, musician
- Bert Geer Phillips, artist, born in Hudson
- Cornelia Holroyd Bradley Richards, author
- Dawn Langley Simmons, intersex author
- Tommy Stinson, musician
- Bob Trowbridge, former Major League Baseball pitcher
- Chris Urbanowicz, musician
- Martin Van Buren, US president, set up his first law office in Hudson
- William Jenkins Worth, army officer, born and raised in Hudson.
- Rupert Wyatt, filmmaker

== In popular culture ==
Hudson is the town in which author Jen Beagin set her 2023 novel Big Swiss.
