= Oliver Wiswall House =

Historic house in New York, United States

- U.S. National Register of Historic Places
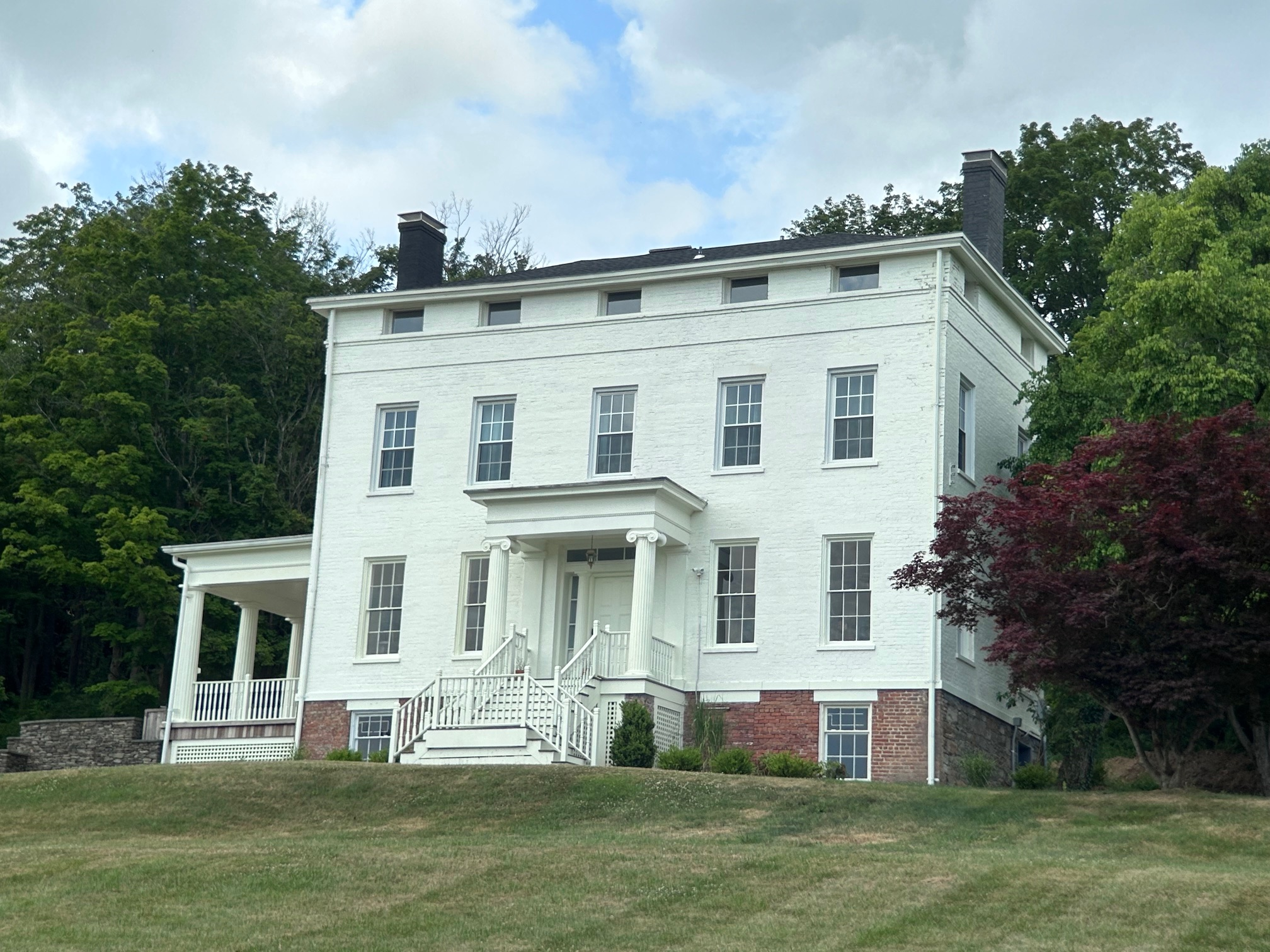
- Oliver Wiswall House, Hudson NY 2025

- Location within New York Location within the United States
- Nearest city: Hudson, New York
- Coordinates: 42°14′47″N 73°48′34″W
- Area: 29.8 acres (12.1 ha)
- Built: 1836
- Architectural style: Greek Revival
- NRHP reference No.: 80002599
- Added to NRHP: September 4, 1980

Oliver Wiswall House is a historic home located at Hudson in Columbia County, New York, United States. It was built about 1836 and is a 2 1/2-story, L-shaped brick dwelling with a low pitched hipped roof in the Greek Revival style. The north elevation has porch with four Doric order columns and a dentilled cornice. Also on the property is a garage dated to the 1930s. A substantial rear addition was built in the 1980s to provide modern amenities while preserving the historic front sections.

It was added to the National Register of Historic Places in 1980.

== Architectural and historic significance ==
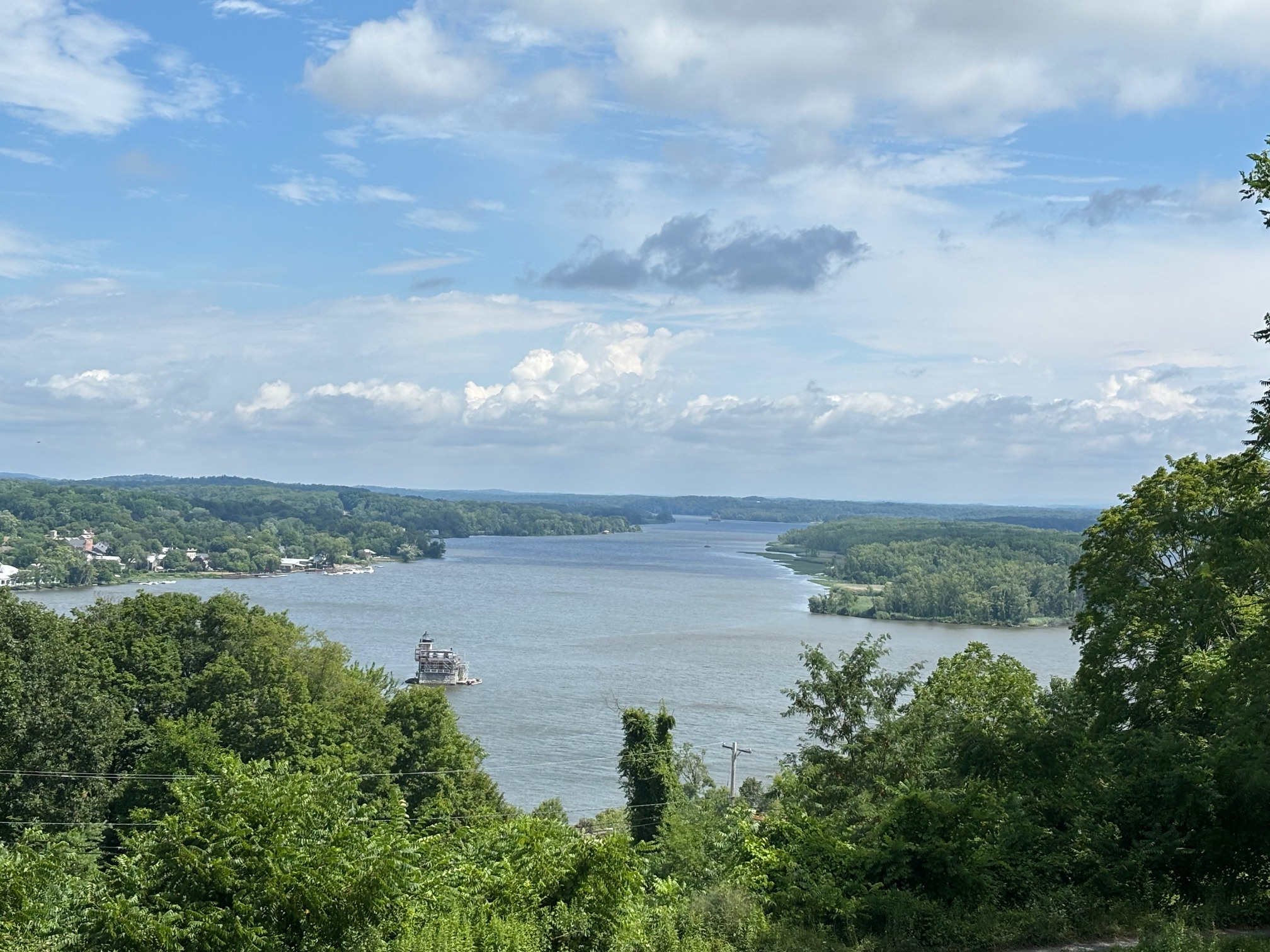
Hudson River view from the Wiswall House

The house holds both architectural and historic significance due to both its architecture and its association with local history. It was built by Oliver Wiswall a prominent citizen of Hudson to serve as his family residence on his Mount Merino farm just outside the Hudson city limits in Greenport, New York.

The location of the house provides sweeping views of the Hudson River much prized by the Hudson River School painters. The view from the house encompasses the river, the historic Hudson Athens Lighthouse, the town of Athens, New York (directly across the river to the west) and the Catskill Mountains in the distance. The house is located on Mount Merino Road which was named for merino sheep which were bred on the prominent hill, "Mount Merino," for wool. In 1810-1811 merino sheep were first offered for sale in the area designating the location as "Mount Merino," this was the first mention of this name for the mountain previously called "Rorabuck" The Greenport Conservation Area is land that once formed part of Wiswall's holdings on the mount.

Mount Merino is featured on many Hudson River School Paintings. Sanford R. Gifford painted at least eleven distinct views of Mount Merino and Henry Ayr painted many views as well. Two examples are shown on this page.

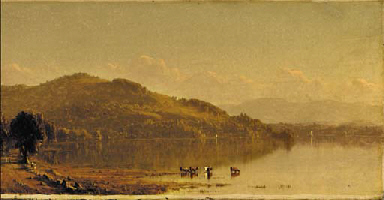
Gifford Sanford Robinson Mount Merino

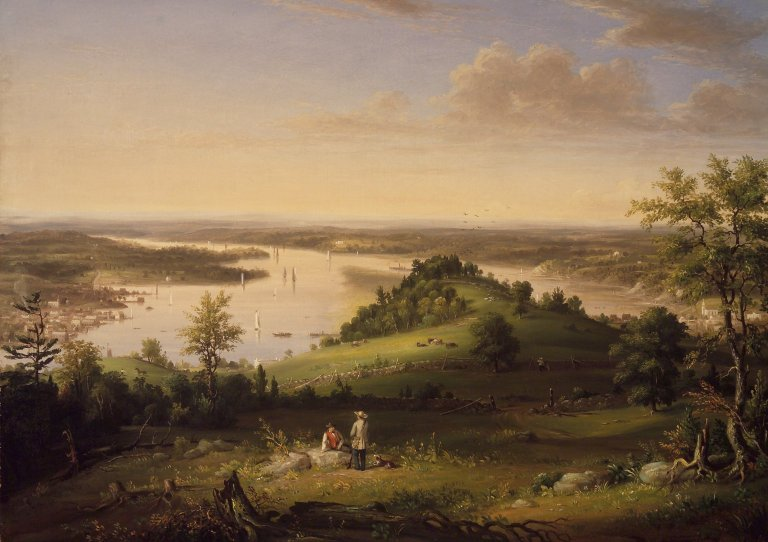
Brooklyn Museum - View from Mount Merino near Hudson - Henry Ary

== Oliver Wiswall ==
Oliver Wiswall (1780-1863) was an important business man and public figure in Hudson, New York. Wiswall was born on Martha's Vineyard and moved to Hudson with his mother when he was nine years old. In Hudson he engaged in various business ventures at an early age. In 1824 he purchased the Hudson Gazette along with other local Democrats. He was president of the Hudson River bank until 1855 when its charter expired.

Wiswall is considered to be the founder of the town of Greenport. When the town was founded in 1837, he was in his 50s and living in his new house on Mount Merino.

As a public figure, Wiswall served as Mayor of Hudson and also as Supervisor and Member of Assembly. He died on January 27, 1863.

Wiswall's brother Samuel was a famous captain on the Hudson River. He was in charge of the boat that brought Lafayette up the river in his 1826 tour which included a brief stop in Hudson. Captain Samuel Wiswall bridged the transition from wind to steam, and was considered by Robert Fulton to be his "right hand man."

The History of the City of Hudson written 15 years after Wiswall's death, reports:

Oliver Wiswall was a public man of great energy and activity. He was mayor of the city of Hudson in 1827 and 1828. His old homestead was located on Mount Merino, and most beautifully situated. The mansion is a solidly-constructed building, erected for use and domestic comfort rather than for show. In the rear of it rise the cedar-crowned heights, southward is the garden, and beyond the garden are the spacious barns. In front of the mansion is a fine billiard-parlor, mistaken by many for a rural Episcopal chapel. A little south and opposite the garden is a deep glen, through which a small rill tumbles to the Hudson. Below the bank is the railroad track, noisy with rattling trains. Beyond the river, westward, the slopes of the opposite shore rise in quiet beauty, and blend with the loftier heights of the Catskills.
