= Hudson Almshouse =

- U.S. National Register of Historic Places
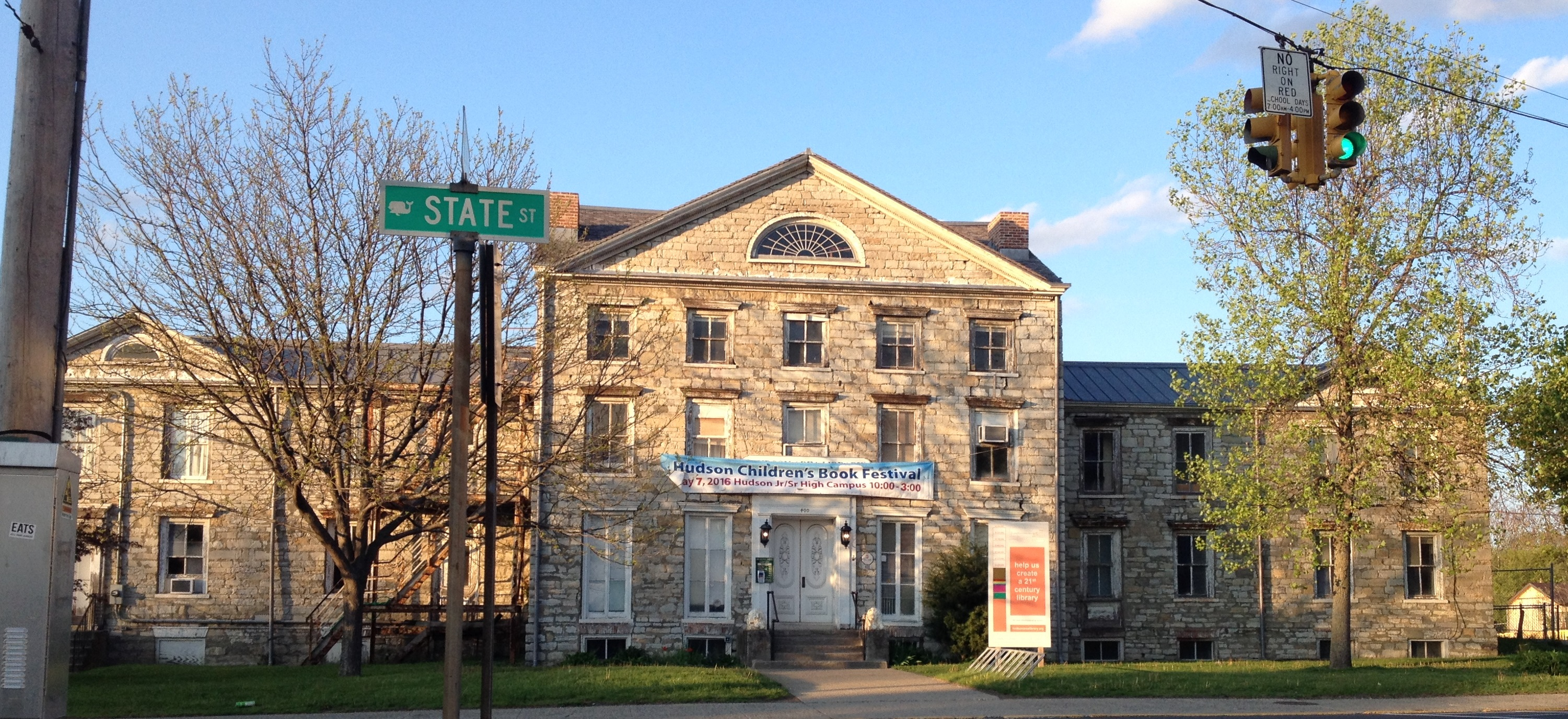

- Location within New York Location within the United States
- Location: 400 State St., at the head of 4th St., Hudson, New York
- Coordinates: 42°15′09″N 73°47′13″W
- Area: less than one acre
- Built: c. 1818, c. 1884-1889
- Architectural style: Federal
- NRHP reference No.: 08000921
- Added to NRHP: August 6, 2007

Hudson Almshouse, also known as the Hudson Lunatic Asylum, Hudson Orphan and Relief Association, and Hudson Area Association Library, is a historic almshouse located at Hudson, Columbia County, New York. It was built about 1818, with a substantial rear addition built between about 1884 and 1889. It consists of a three-story central section with two-story flanking wings constructed of dressed limestone. Originally built as an almshouse, it subsequently served as a mental health asylum, female academy, private home, and from 1959 to 2016, the local association library.

It was added to the National Register of Historic Places in 2008.
