= Harold Macy =

American microbiologist

Harold Macy (1895–1986) was an American microbiologist, specializing in bacteria and dairy.

A native of Hudson, New York, born in 1895, Macy graduated from Cornell University in 1917. He worked two years for the American Red Cross, and also served in the United States Army during World War I. In 1919, Macy joined the University of Minnesota faculty. Ten years later, he earned a doctorate from Iowa State College. Macy was assigned to the United States Army Sanitary Corps during World War II, and sent to France. For his military service, the French government awarded Macy the Order of Public Health and named him a chevalier of the Legion of Honor. In March 1946, Macy became associate director of the University of Minnesota Agricultural Experiment Station. He was promoted to director in 1950, leaving the post in January 1953 for a second promotion, this time to the deanship of UMN's Institute of Agriculture. Over the course of his career, Macy became a member of the Society of American Bacteriologists, the American Dairy Science Association, and the Institute of Food Technologists. He was granted fellowship by the American Public Health Association and the American Association for the Advancement of Science. The Minnesota Section of the Institute of Food Technologists inaugurated the Harold Macy Award in 1981 to honor him.
