= Greg Quinn (politician) =

American politician

Member of the St. Louis County Council from the 7th district
- Incumbent
- Assumed office 1991

Personal details
- Party: Republican
- Children: 3
- Education: Michigan State University; Washington University in St. Louis

Gregory F. Quinn is an American attorney and Republican member of the St. Louis County Council. Quinn has represented the seventh district since 1991.

== Early life and career ==
Quinn received his bachelor's degree in economics from Michigan State University in 1972. He went on to receive his J.D. degree from Washington University School of Law in 1975. While in law school he was editor of the Urban Law Annual. He has been admitted to the Missouri bar and Illinois bar. He is currently a partner at Quinn & Banton, L.L.P., formerly Quinn, Ground, & Banton, where he has worked since 1976, when he co-founded the firm with law school classmate Paul Ground. Another partner at the firm, Steve Banton, is a president of the Rockwood school board and state representative. Quinn's areas of practice are workers' compensation, personal injury, probation and estate planning, employment law, and business transactions. He is married to Micki Quinn and has three kids. He attends the St Clare of Assisi Church in Ballwin.

== Political career ==
Quinn has been a member of the St. Louis County Council since 1991. He has served two terms as council chairman. He represents the seventh district, which contains about 145,000 people in west St. Louis County.

=== Committee assignments ===
- Committee of the Whole
- Committee on Disabilities
- Revenue and Personnel

== Electoral history ==
2010 St. Louis County Council 7th district general election
Party	Candidate	Votes	%	±%
Republican	Greg Quinn	48,209	98.80	

2006 St. Louis County Council 7th district general election
Party	Candidate	Votes	%	±%
Republican	Greg Quinn	40,279	63.46	
Democratic	Steven Biggs	23,137	36.46	

2002 St. Louis County Council 7th district general election
Party	Candidate	Votes	%	±%
Republican	Greg Quinn	48,223		

1998 St. Louis County Council 7th district general election
Party	Candidate	Votes	%	±%
Republican	Greg Quinn	44,060		

== See also ==
- St. Louis County, Missouri
- St. Louis County Council
