= Skyfaring: A Journey with a Pilot =

Aviation book

- Author: Mark Vanhoenacker
- Language: English
- Publisher: Alfred A. Knopf (US); Chatto & Windus/Vintage Books (UK)
- Publication date: 2015
- Publication place: United Kingdom
- Media type: Print; digital
- ISBN: 9780804169714

Skyfaring: A Journey with a Pilot is a non-fiction book authored by commercial pilot Mark Vanhoenacker, based on his experiences as a commercial pilot for the Boeing 747 with British Airways. Reviewer Peter Lewis has described the book as "part memoir, part diary".

The book appeared on the Sunday Times bestseller list and was a BBC Radio 4 Book of the Week in April 2015. The New York Times included the book in its list of 100 Notable Books of the Year 2015. It was also included in The Economist books of the year list.
