= Hudson Hall (arts organization) =

Hudson Hall at the historic Hudson Opera House
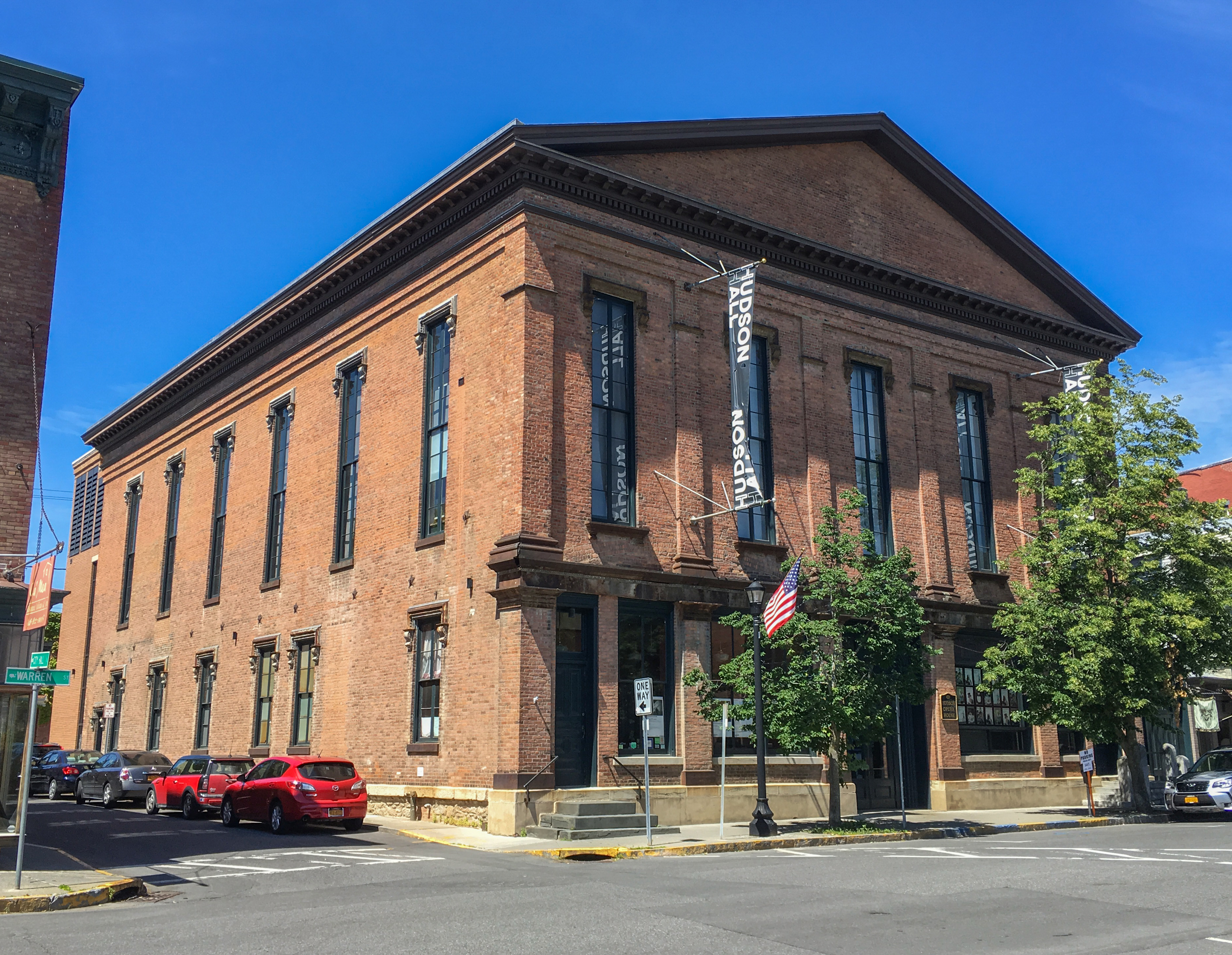
- Formation: 1992; 34 years ago
- Headquarters: 327 Warren St., Hudson, NY
- Coordinates: 42°15′08″N 73°47′25″W
- Website: Official website

Hudson Hall at the historic Hudson Opera House is an arts organization and venue in downtown Hudson, New York. The organization presents and produces arts and cultural programming year-round, and is an important civic partner in the vitality of Hudson. The building, constructed in 1855 as Hudson's city hall, is New York's oldest surviving theater.

== History ==
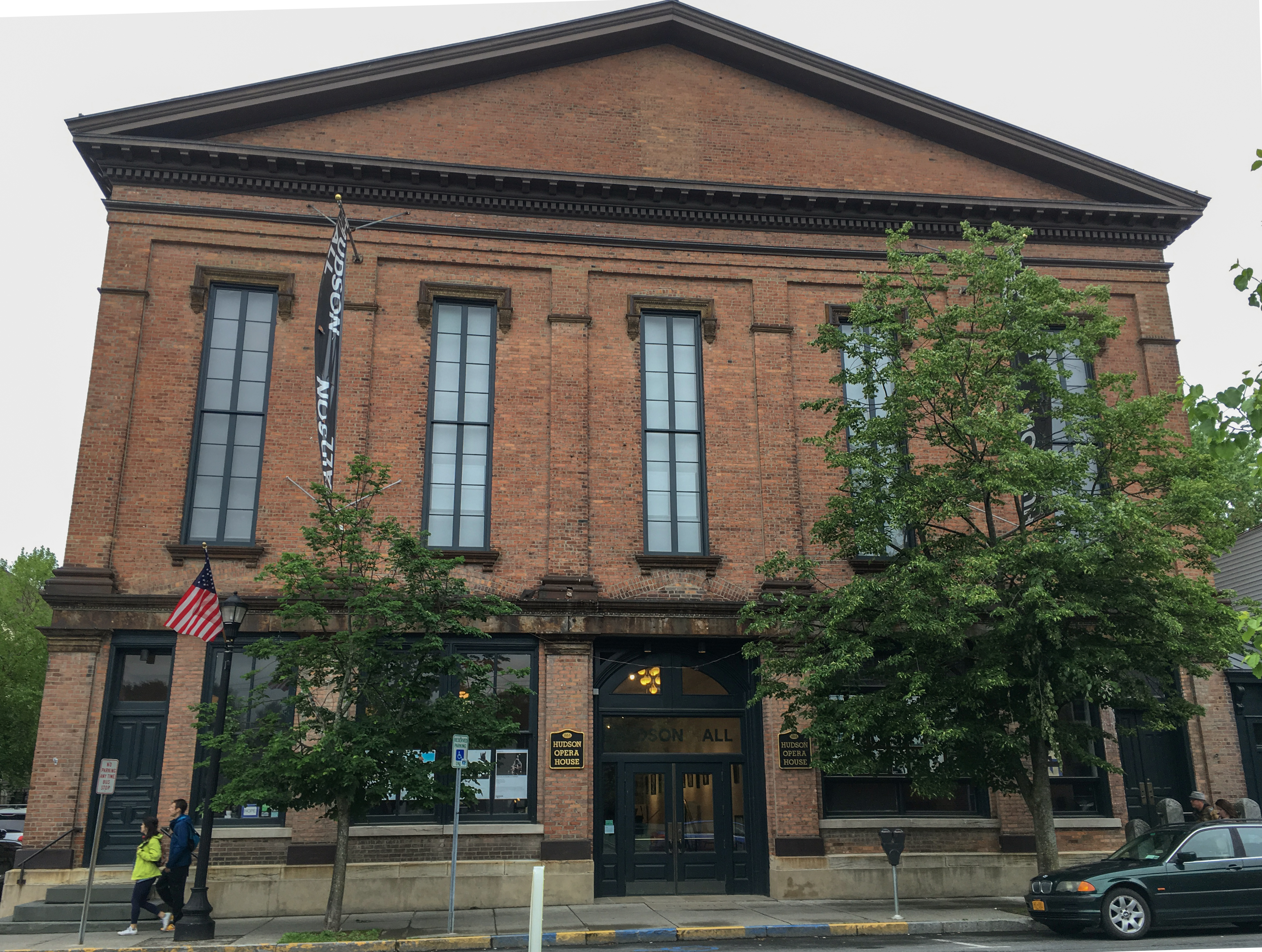
Main facade

The building was designed by local architect Peter H. Avery and was constructed in 1855 at 327 Warren Street. It was built as Hudson's first city hall, including a public space with a proposed 400 seats and space for 2,000 overall.

As city hall it was home to a number of things, including the post office, Franklin Library, and the First National Bank of Hudson. It also was used as a lecture hall and an art gallery. Around 1880, many American town halls were changing their names to "Opera House" to follow the fashion of the recently constructed Paris Opera house. Due to the trend, the Hudson Opera House was given its name. It was large enough to continue its government duties while holding different events such as "traveling lecture presentations and musical and theatrical events to local functions like dances, cotillions, poultry shows and graduations". The second floor of the opera house was a "common ground where white and black citizens could meet”.

In 1962, after the city hall had relocated up Warren Street, the Hudson Opera House became a local Moose Lodge and was later sold to an out-of-town developer. Afterward, the building was left abandoned and began to decay. A group of concerned citizens gathered together to renovate the historical building; in 1992 they formed Hudson Opera House, Inc., a non-profit organization set on bringing the Hudson Opera House back to full community use. In 1996, the organization began a campaign which "raised the money to open the first restored room in the building, the West Room, in December 1997" (Hudson Opera House). Since that time the group has raised enough money to restore five other rooms on the first floor which host various cultural events.

== Restoration ==
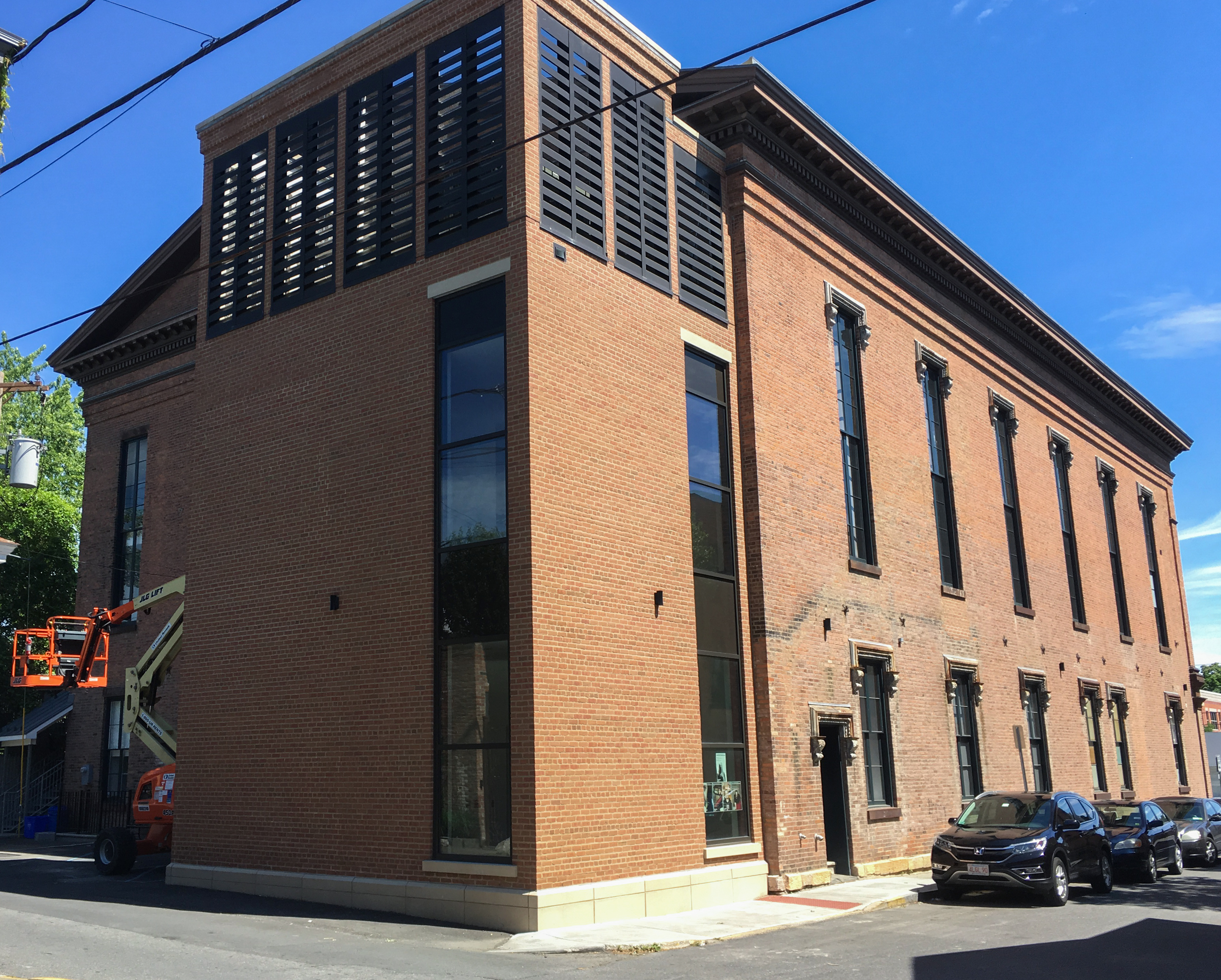
From the back

In December 1997, the Hudson Opera House, Inc. completed restoration of the first-floor West Room, with new floors, a new ceiling, and a re-painting. It is "in frequent use for concerts, lectures and community gatherings". (Hudson Opera House).

In March 2001, the Center Hall Gallery re-opened with rebuilt stairs and restrooms; it is used for exhibitions, receptions, and workshops. That September, the Workshop Room re-opened, and in 2002 the Lower Façade and the East Room Steps were restored. The Lower Façade Restoration was set up as originally constructed, while the East Room Steps were removed and replaced.

The East Room Offices were restored in 2003, and the Center Door Restoration in 2004. In 2008 Hudson Opera House installed a new roof and restored the existing 1855 monumental cornice on all four façades.

In 2016, restoration began on the historic upstairs performance hall, the largest and most ambitious restoration project to date. The $8.5 million project was funded through a $1.3 million Capital Region Economic Development Council Capital Grant, a $1 million Restore NY Grant; a matching EPF grant leveraging $800,000 in grants from the New York State Office of Parks, Recreation and Historic Preservation; nearly $100,000 from the New York State Council for the Arts; and $3 million from the U.S. Department of Agriculture Community Facilities Loan Program. The remaining funding was supported through investments from members of the Hudson Opera House Board of Directors and private sponsors.

Interior renovations included restoring the theater to a professional-grade working venue suitable for a diverse range of programming and rentals. Work included the rehabilitation of the stage, performance hall, and mezzanine, featuring a new lighting and sound booth. Support spaces were also restored, including dressing rooms, a Reception Room, and accessible restrooms. The project included preservation of the facility’s historic character, including the proscenium arch and raked wooden-floor stage, which were late-19th-century additions. The historic fabric was also retained, with new elements sensitively incorporated to retain the overall historic character of the spaces.

Additionally, the opera house was modernized to ensure accessibility, safety, and security for patrons, performers, and staff. A new elevator tower in the southeast corner makes the performance hall fully accessible to all for the first time in the building’s more than 160-year history. The facility underwent lead and asbestos abatement services, and new electrical, fire protection, and HVAC systems were installed. Exterior renovations included the restoration of the facility’s masonry, windows, and doors. A new roof was installed and the building’s cornice was restored.

The Hudson Opera House was renamed "Hudson Hall at the historic Hudson Opera House" and reopened on April 22, 2017.

== Events ==
From live performances of music, dance, and theater; to readings, lectures, workshops, and youth activities; to a breadth of art exhibitions, Hudson Hall hosts a range of events and activities for all ages. In the winter, Hudson Hall produces the town of Hudson’s biggest tourism event, Winter Walk, celebrating 25 years in 2021. During Winter Walk, people stroll through Hudson's business district taking in music and dance performances, art, street performers, and visiting the many local shops and eateries.

Throughout the year at Hudson Hall, people participate in workshops to learn how to draw, paint, and dance. From Shakespearean productions tailored for kids, to hip-hop dance, Hudson Hall is dedicated to creating a family-friendly environment. Hudson Hall is open year-round, providing a constant resource of art and education for the Hudson Valley.

=== Notable visitors ===
- 1855, 1866: Henry Ward Beecher, minister and orator
- 1855, 1859, 1894: Susan B. Anthony, abolitionist
- 1866: Marietta Gazzaniga, Italian soprano
- 1866: Ralph Waldo Emerson, writer
- 1868 twice, 1871, 1874: Blind Tom Wiggins, musical savant
- 1874: Carl Schurz, US Senator & Secretary of Interior
- 1878: Elizabeth Cady Stanton, abolitionist
- 1894, 1898: Anna Howard Shaw, suffragist and prohibitionist
- 1929: Clarence Darrow, criminal lawyer
