= Mark Vanhoenacker =

Belgian American Pilot and Author

- Born: Mark Vanhoenacker; 1974 (age 51–52); Pittsfield, Massachusetts
- Known for: Commercial pilot, author, and aviation columnist

Mark Vanhoenacker (born 1974) is a Belgian-American airline pilot and author. He is a Boeing 787 pilot with British Airways and is also frequent contributor for the New York Times, Slate and the Financial Times with a focus on aviation. His first book, Skyfaring: A Journey with a Pilot was published in 2015, followed by How to Land a Plane in 2017, and Imagine a City in 2022.

== Life ==
Vanhoenacker was born in Pittsfield, Massachusetts. His father, a former priest who left his vocation, was born in Belgium. His mother was born to a Lithuanian family in the United States. He has an adopted brother.

Vanhoenacker studied at Amherst College, before undertaking an MPhil in history at the University of Cambridge. He started a PhD programme in East African history but decided after several months that he was more interested in pursuing a career in aviation. While saving money towards the expected cost of his flight training, he worked as a management consultant in Boston. He subsequently joined a British Airways (BA) training programme, and became a pilot of small Airbus aircraft in Europe than going on to become a Boeing 747 pilot. Following the retirement of the 747 fleet in 2020, Vanhoenacker now flies Boeing 787 aircraft. Vanhoenacker is gay.

== Writing ==
Vanhoenacker is a contributor to newspapers including the New York Times and Financial Times, and news websites such as Slate, with a focus on commercial aviation. He has written the following books:

- Skyfaring: A Journey with a Pilot (2015), Alfred A. Knopf (US) and Chatto & Windus/Vintage Books (UK), ISBN 9780385351829
- How to Land a Plane (2017), Quercus, ISBN 9781786487162
- Imagine a City: A Pilot Sees the World (2022), Chatto & Windus, ISBN 9781784743253
