= Greg Quinn (farmer) =

American farmer in Staatsburg, New York (born 1950)

Coordinates: 41°50′32″N 73°50′35″W

- Born: Greg Henry Quinn
- Occupation: Farmer
- Known for: Blackcurrant promoter

Greg Quinn (born 1950) is an American farmer in Staatsburg, New York, who lobbied several NY state senators and assemblypersons and in 2003, was successful in overturning the ban on the commercial cultivation of blackcurrants, enacted by Congress in 1911. blackcurrants, a berry fruit used in juice, jams, candy, yogurt, ice cream, and cereal provide twice the antioxidant ORAC capacity per serving of blueberries, four times the vitamin C content of oranges, and twice the potassium content of bananas. With no supply and no market, Quinn founded his company, CurrantC™, in 2003 and began to grow black currants on his 135-acre (55 ha), farm and Quinn sought to interest consumers and New York farmers in the fruit, which was then being supplied to the United States by Europe usually in the form of preserves. CurrantC™ is now the number one supplier of Currant products in the United States. In addition to farming and teaching at the New York Botanical Garden, Quinn has written eight children's books published by Scholastic Press, including the titles A Gift of a Tree, The Garden in Our Yard, 365 Meditations for Teachers, and books within the Natural Treasure series. He also has written for SKY magazine, Good Housekeeping, and Fine Gardening and has been "The Garden and Nature Guy" on WHUD and other Pamal Broadcasting radio stations, and FOX 5 television, WNYW out of New York City.
