= National Register of Historic Places listings in Columbia County, New York =

Location of Columbia County in New York

This is intended to be a complete list of properties and districts listed on the National Register of Historic Places in Columbia County, New York. Seven properties and districts are further designated National Historic Landmarks.

The locations of National Register properties and districts for which the latitude and longitude coordinates are included below, may be seen in a map.

This National Park Service list is complete through NPS recent listings posted September 25, 2026.

Contents: Counties in New York
Albany (Albany) – Allegany – Bronx – Broome – Cattaraugus – Cayuga – Chautauqua – Chemung – Chenango – Clinton – Columbia – Cortland – Delaware – Dutchess (Poughkeepsie, Rhinebeck) – Erie (Buffalo) – Essex – Franklin – Fulton – Genesee – Greene – Hamilton – Herkimer – Jefferson – Kings – Lewis – Livingston – Madison – Monroe (Rochester) – Montgomery – Nassau – New York (Below 14th Street, 14th to 59th Streets, 59th to 110th Streets, Above 110th Street, Islands) – Niagara (Niagara Falls) – Oneida – Onondaga (Syracuse) – Ontario – Orange – Orleans – Oswego – Otsego – Putnam – Queens – Rensselaer – Richmond – Rockland – St. Lawrence – Saratoga – Schenectady – Schoharie – Schuyler – Seneca – Steuben – Suffolk – Sullivan – Tioga – Tompkins – Ulster – Warren – Washington – Wayne – Westchester (Northern, Southern, New Rochelle, Peekskill, Yonkers) – Wyoming – Yates

== Listings county-wide ==
| | Name on the Register | Image | Date listed | Location | City or town | Description |
|---|---|---|---|---|---|---|
| 1 | Ancram Hamlet Historic District | Ancram Hamlet Historic District | January 13, 2017 (#100000477) | Cty Rte. 7, NY Rte 82, Cty Rte 8; 42°03′01″N 73°38′11″W | Ancram | Core of country town that grew up around state's first ironworks |
| 2 | Ancramdale Historic District | | November 27, 2019 (#100004668) | NY 82, Cty. Rd. 3 & 8, Maple Ln. 42°01′05″N 73°35′29″W | Ancramdale | |
| 3 | Austerlitz Historic District | Austerlitz Historic District | May 25, 2018 (#100002507) | NY 22, Harvey Mtn., E Hill, W Hill & Old Rds; 42°18′24″N 73°28′22″W | Austerlitz | "Old Austerlitz" is a well-preserved group of buildings reflecting influx of settlers from New England between the end of the 18th century and 1870. |
| 4 | Daniel and Clarissa Baldwin House | | June 27, 2012 (#12000366) | 1018 Dugway Rd. 42°19′02″N 73°32′11″W | Spencertown | |
| 5 | Barringer–Overbaugh–Lasher House | Barringer–Overbaugh–Lasher House | December 2, 2014 (#14000980) | 321 Main St. 42°07′57″N 73°52′48″W | Germantown | Recently renovated house of early working-class settlers built around 1800; main section is one of the few remaining examples in the area of New World Dutch timber construction methods |
| 6 | Bartlett House | Bartlett House | May 8, 2012 (#12000268) | 2258 NY 66; 42°19′37″N 73°37′06″W | Ghent | Railroad hotel for the New York and Harlem and Hudson and Boston Railroads |
| 7 | Bigelow-Finch-Fowler Farm | Bigelow-Finch-Fowler Farm | November 4, 2019 (#100004553) | 1549 US 20; 42°29′08″N 73°28′15″W | West Lebanon | |
| 8 | Blinn-Pulver Farmhouse | | February 12, 2003 (#03000025) | 219 Hudson Ave. 42°20′57″N 73°36′14″W | Chatham | |
| 9 | Bouwerie | | October 7, 1983 (#83003918) | Buckwheat Bridge Rd. 42°05′22″N 73°48′46″W | Clermont | |
| 10 | Thomas Brodhead House | Thomas Brodhead House | October 7, 1983 (#83003919) | US 9; 42°05′24″N 73°49′21″W | Clermont | Intact 1795 Federal style brick house |
| 11 | Dr. Oliver Bronson House and Estate | Dr. Oliver Bronson House and Estate | July 31, 2003 (#03001035) | West of US 9; 42°14′35″N 73°47′08″W | Hudson | First house built in Hudson River Bracketed style. Now on prison grounds. |
| 12 | Dr. Oliver Bronson House and Stables | Dr. Oliver Bronson House and Stables | February 20, 1973 (#73001173) | South of Hudson off US 9; 42°14′28″N 73°47′06″W | Hudson | |
| 13 | Burroughs–Foland Farm | Burroughs–Foland Farm | May 12, 2014 (#14000205) | 2323 US 9; 42°06′46″N 73°48′33″W | Livingston | Farm's 1903 main house is a rare rural Mission Revival style house in New York |
| 14 | Church of Our Saviour | Church of Our Saviour | February 14, 1997 (#97000067) | NY 22, near the junction with US 20, Hamlet of Lebanon Springs; 42°28′27″N 73°22′50″W | New Lebanon | |
| 15 | Church of St. John in the Wilderness | Church of St. John in the Wilderness | August 10, 1995 (#95000963) | Junction of NY 344 and Valley View Rd. 42°07′14″N 73°31′09″W | Copake Falls | |
| 16 | Church of St. John the Evangelist | Church of St. John the Evangelist | April 13, 1972 (#72000827) | Chittenden Rd. 42°18′30″N 73°44′51″W | Stockport | |
| 17 | Clarkson Chapel | Clarkson Chapel | October 7, 1983 (#83003920) | NY 9G; 42°05′37″N 73°53′48″W | Clermont | 1860 Carpenter Gothic chapel built by Livingston family |
| 18 | Claverack Free Library | Claverack Free Library | January 7, 1998 (#97001624) | 629 NY 23B; 42°13′22″N 73°44′09″W | Claverack | 1932 Colonial Revival library |
| 19 | Clermont | Clermont | February 18, 1971 (#71000535) | Clermont State Park; 42°04′59″N 73°55′40″W | Germantown | Seat of Livingston family lands in region |
| 20 | Clermont Academy | Clermont Academy | October 7, 1983 (#83003931) | US 9; 42°05′12″N 73°49′34″W | Clermont | Wooden Federal style building erected in 1834 is oldest school building in state, although no longer in use. |
| 21 | Clermont Civic Historic District | Clermont Civic Historic District | July 3, 2003 (#03000604) | 1795 US 9; 42°05′14″N 73°49′34″W | Clermont | 19th-century buildings from early years of town |
| 22 | Clermont Estates Historic District | Clermont Estates Historic District | May 7, 1979 (#79001572) | South of Germantown; 42°06′07″N 73°54′53″W | Germantown | Subsumed into Hudson River Historic District along with Sixteen Mile District |
| 23 | Columbia Turnpike-East Tollhouse | Columbia Turnpike-East Tollhouse | June 23, 2016 (#16000411) | NY 23; 42°11′04″N 73°29′26″W | Hillsdale | 1830s wooden house was part of major transportation route into Massachusetts for most of 19th century |
| 24 | Columbia Turnpike-West Tollhouse | Columbia Turnpike-West Tollhouse | December 28, 2000 (#00001571) | NY 23B; 42°14′21″N 73°45′37″W | Greenport | |
| 25 | Charles H. Coons Farm | Charles H. Coons Farm | July 22, 2015 (#15000475) | 516 Church Ave. 42°06′43″N 73°53′06″W | Germantown | Complex built by successful 19th-century fruit farm includes Picturesque farmhouse and New World Dutch barn |
| 26 | Coons House | Coons House | October 7, 1983 (#83003932) | NY 9G; 42°05′33″N 73°53′41″W | Clermont | 1850 home is only temple-style Greek Revival building in Clermont. |
| 27 | Copake Falls Methodist Episcopal Church | Copake Falls Methodist Episcopal Church | July 11, 2012 (#12000405) | Miles Rd. 42°07′10″N 73°31′27″W | Copake Falls | Now the Roeliff Jansen Historical Society |
| 28 | Copake Grange Hall | Copake Grange Hall | July 3, 2001 (#01000291) | Empire Rd., south of Old Route 22; 42°06′09″N 73°33′01″W | Copake | |
| 29 | Copake Iron Works Historic District | Copake Iron Works Historic District | April 18, 2007 (#07000334) | Taconic State Park; 42°07′09″N 73°30′50″W | Copake Falls | |
| 30 | Copake Memorial Clock | Copake Memorial Clock | February 3, 2012 (#11001089) | Main St. 42°06′13″N 73°32′58″W | Copake | 1944 World War II memorial has become symbol of this small town |
| 31 | Copake Railroad Depot | Copake Railroad Depot | January 19, 2024 (#100009779) | 32 County Route 7A; 42°05′43″N 73°32′39″W | Copake | |
| 32 | Copake United Methodist Church and Copake Cemetery | | June 27, 2007 (#07000624) | Church St. 42°06′14″N 73°33′05″W | Copake | |
| 33 | Crandell Theatre | Crandell Theatre | September 18, 2017 (#100001623) | 46–48 Main St. 42°21′48″N 73°35′44″W | Chatham | |
| 34 | Crow Hill | Crow Hill | May 9, 1997 (#97000412) | Junction of NY 9H and Co. Rt. 21, northwest corner 42°23′22″N 73°41′24″W | Kinderhook | |
| 35 | Dick House | Dick House | July 29, 2009 (#09000573) | 641 Co. Rte. 8; 42°07′36″N 73°51′17″W | Germantown | |
| 36 | Donnelly House | | August 2, 2000 (#00000880) | Cty. Rd. 5; 42°26′49″N 73°26′00″W | New Lebanon | |
| 37 | Dr. Joseph P. Dorr House | | October 31, 2007 (#07001123) | 2745 NY 23; 42°10′58″N 73°31′05″W | Hillsdale | |
| 38 | Double-Span Whipple Bowstring Truss Bridge | Double-Span Whipple Bowstring Truss Bridge | April 17, 1980 (#80002598) | Van Wyck Lane; 42°12′54″N 73°43′45″W | Claverack | Shaw Bridge, currently closed to all traffic, is only bridge of this type with two spans in the country |
| 39 | Henry A. and Evanlina Dubois House | Henry A. and Evanlina Dubois House | December 6, 2004 (#04001340) | 105 Ten Broeck Ln. 42°14′23″N 73°46′53″W | Hudson | |
| 40 | Emmanuel Lutheran Church of Harlemville and Cemetery | | January 24, 2002 (#01001505) | Cty. 21 and Pheasant Ln., Harlemville Rd. at Ten Broeck Rd. 42°15′54″N 73°35′03″W | Harlemville | |
| 41 | Cornelius H. Evans House | Cornelius H. Evans House | November 1, 1974 (#74001226) | 414–416 Warren St. 42°15′04″N 73°47′19″W | Hudson | Intact 1861 house of local brewer and two-term city mayor |
| 42 | Fairview Manor | | September 5, 2023 (#100009291) | 20 NY 9H; 42°13′26″N 73°44′06″W | Claverack | |
| 43 | George Felpel House | George Felpel House | August 21, 1997 (#97000927) | 60 NY 9H; 42°13′41″N 73°43′54″W | Claverack | 1922 Colonial Revival house built with remaining stones from Claverack College |
| 44 | First Columbia County Courthouse | First Columbia County Courthouse | January 7, 1998 (#97001623) | 549 NY 23B; 42°13′23″N 73°44′35″W | Claverack | 1786 courthouse, now apartments, was original court of Harry Croswell sedition trial |
| 45 | First Presbyterian Church | First Presbyterian Church | September 7, 1979 (#79001574) | Church St. 42°24′55″N 73°40′36″W | Valatie | |
| 46 | Forth House | | June 11, 2010 (#10000331) | 2751 US-9; 42°09′30″N 73°46′14″W | Livingston | |
| 47 | Front Street-Parade Hill-Lower Warren Street Historic District | Front Street-Parade Hill-Lower Warren Street Historic District | March 5, 1970 (#70000420) | Front and Warren Sts. 42°15′19″N 73°47′42″W | Hudson | Superseded by later Hudson Historic District after some properties demolished |
| 48 | Gallatin Reformed Church & Cemetery | Gallatin Reformed Church & Cemetery | July 29, 2021 (#100006759) | 234 Cty. Rd. 7; 42°01′11″N 73°42′12″W | Gallatinville | |
| 49 | German Reformed Sanctity Church Parsonage | German Reformed Sanctity Church Parsonage | January 30, 1976 (#76001209) | Maple Ave. 42°08′30″N 73°52′59″W | Germantown | Parsonage remaining from early days of Palatine German settlement in the region built in two sections in mid-18th century. Oldest building in town. |
| 50 | Elisha Gilbert House | | September 7, 1984 (#84002098) | US 20; 42°28′09″N 73°25′46″W | New Lebanon | |
| 51 | Glenco Mills Methodist Church | Glenco Mills Methodist Church | December 30, 2019 (#100004818) | 42°09′01″N 73°44′30″W | Glenco Mills | 1869 church funded by native with the money he made working in New York City |
| 52 | Harder Knitting Mill | Harder Knitting Mill | January 27, 2023 (#100008575) | 549 Washington St. 42°15′02″N 73°46′53″W | Hudson | |
| 53 | Hickory Hill | | October 7, 1983 (#83003934) | Buckwheat Bridge Rd. 42°05′39″N 73°49′06″W | Clermont | |
| 54 | Hillsdale Hamlet Historic District | Hillsdale Hamlet Historic District | January 27, 2010 (#09001283) | NY-22 and NY-23, Anthony, Cold Water and Maple Sts., Old Town and Pill Hill Rds. 42°10′48″N 73°31′18″W | Hillsdale | Historic core of small country town |
| 55 | Stephen Hogeboom House | Stephen Hogeboom House | August 21, 1997 (#97000944) | 562 NY 23B; 42°13′21″N 73°44′33″W | Claverack | Intact late 18th-century house at original center of community later renovated in Greek Revival style |
| 56 | House at New Forge | | December 14, 1987 (#87002143) | 128 New Forge Rd. 42°06′23″N 73°40′32″W | New Forge | |
| 57 | Houses at 37–47 North Fifth St. | Houses at 37–47 North Fifth St. | November 15, 2003 (#03001142) | 37–47 N. Fifth St. 42°15′02″N 73°47′09″W | Hudson | Intact frame Italianate worker houses from the 1870s. Used today by substance-abuse rehabilitation program. |
| 58 | Hudson Almshouse | Hudson Almshouse | September 19, 2008 (#08000921) | 400 State St., at the head of 4th St. 42°15′09″N 73°47′13″W | Hudson | |
| 59 | Hudson Historic District | Hudson Historic District | October 21, 1985 (#85003363) | Roughly bounded by Warren and State Sts., Eighth and Seventh Sts., E. Allen and Allen St., and Penn Central RR; 42°15′00″N 73°47′18″W | Hudson | City's downtown developed along grid pattern devised in 1785; over 700 contributing properties from late 18th to early 20th centuries. Warren Street is the most intact 19th-century commercial street in the state. |
| 60 | Hudson River Heritage Historic District | Hudson River Heritage Historic District | December 14, 1990 (#90002219) | East side of the Hudson River between Germantown and Staatsburg; 42°00′39″N 73°55′19″W | Germantown | 35 square miles (91 km^{2}) along east bank of river, shared with Dutchess County, retaining architecture and land use from semi-feudal colonial era. Largest historic district on U.S. mainland. |
| 61 | Hudson/Athens Lighthouse | Hudson/Athens Lighthouse | May 29, 1979 (#79003796) | South of Middle Ground Flats in Hudson River; 42°15′06″N 73°48′32″W | Hudson | 1873 Second Empire lighthouse on caisson is model for Stepping Stones Light off Long Island |
| 62 | Dr. Abram Jordan House | Dr. Abram Jordan House | September 9, 1999 (#99001135) | 137 NY 23; 42°13′29″N 73°43′27″W | Claverack | Intact 1822 Greek Revival house |
| 63 | Kinderhook Village District | Kinderhook Village District | July 24, 1974 (#74001227) | Both sides of US 9; 42°23′29″N 73°42′02″W | Kinderhook | Intact collection of 18th- and early 19th-century buildings in Martin Van Buren's hometown. |
| 64 | Knollcroft | Knollcroft | August 14, 1985 (#85002287) | CR 9; 42°23′32″N 73°31′51″W | New Concord | |
| 65 | Lace House | Lace House | February 21, 1985 (#85000336) | NY 22 and Miller Rd. 42°22′36″N 73°25′45″W | Canaan | 1806 Federal-style house preserved intact |
| 66 | Lebanon Springs Union Free School | Lebanon Springs Union Free School | November 21, 1991 (#91001727) | NY 22 east of the junction with Cemetery Rd. 42°28′26″N 73°22′58″W | New Lebanon | |
| 67 | Linlithgo Reformed Church of Livingston | Linlithgo Reformed Church of Livingston | February 1, 2006 (#05001614) | 447 Church Rd. 42°08′40″N 73°46′36″W | Livingston | |
| 68 | Livingston Memorial Church and Burial Ground | Livingston Memorial Church and Burial Ground | September 12, 1985 (#85002271) | CR 10 & Wire Rd. 42°10′16″N 73°50′50″W | Linlithgo | |
| 69 | Henry W. Livingston House | | February 18, 1971 (#71000536) | North of Bell's Pond; 42°10′36″N 73°44′58″W | Livingston | |
| 70 | William Henry Ludlow House | William Henry Ludlow House | August 8, 1997 (#97000826) | 465 NY 23B; 42°13′29″N 73°44′46″W | Claverack | |
| 71 | Ludlow-Van Rensselaer House | Ludlow-Van Rensselaer House | August 21, 1997 (#97000945) | 465 NY 23B; 42°13′31″N 73°44′48″W | Claverack | |
| 72 | Lynch Hotel | Lynch Hotel | June 10, 2005 (#05000573) | 41 Ferry Rd. 42°21′22″N 73°47′12″W | Nutten Hook | |
| 73 | James Lynch House | James Lynch House | November 13, 2009 (#09000906) | 33 Ferry Road; 42°21′15″N 73°47′09″W | Nutten Hook | |
| 74 | Melius-Bentley House | | August 11, 1982 (#82005024) | North of Pine Plains on Mt. Ross Rd. 42°00′19″N 73°42′36″W | Ancram | |
| 75 | Mellenville Railroad Station | Mellenville Railroad Station | September 29, 2000 (#00001120) | NY 217; 42°15′11″N 73°40′05″W | Mellenville | |
| 76 | Jacob P. Mesick House | Jacob P. Mesick House | August 21, 1997 (#97000947) | 68 Van Wyck Ln. 42°12′47″N 73°43′37″W | Claverack | Greek Revival house on large farm built ca. 1840 |
| 77 | Harmon Miller House | Harmon Miller House | August 8, 1997 (#97000827) | 6109 9H; 42°12′56″N 73°44′09″W | Claverack | "Brookbound", 1878 home of prosperous local farmer, is one of the few Second Empire buildings in Claverack area |
| 78 | Stephen Miller House | Stephen Miller House | August 8, 1997 (#97000825) | 114 NY 23; 42°13′20″N 73°43′38″W | Claverack | 1790 farmhouse is representative of era's architecture in area. |
| 79 | Mount Lebanon Shaker Society | Mount Lebanon Shaker Society | October 15, 1966 (#66000511) | U.S. 20; 42°26′51″N 73°23′07″W | New Lebanon | Oldest surviving Shaker colony in continuous existence in U.S. |
| 80 | Muldor-Miller House | Muldor-Miller House | October 27, 2022 (#100008312) | 571 NY 23B; 42°13′22″N 73°44′27″W | Claverack | |
| 81 | Cornelius S. Muller House | Cornelius S. Muller House | August 8, 1997 (#97000823) | 602 NY 23B; 42°13′22″N 73°44′20″W | Claverack | 1767 Dutch-English brick house was site of courts martial during Revolution |
| 82 | New Concord Historic District | | January 19, 2010 (#09001268) | County Route 9; 42°23′43″N 73°31′35″W | New Concord | |
| 83 | New Lebanon District No. 8 School | | April 22, 2021 (#100006480) | 565 US 20 (Columbia Tpk.); 42°27′53″N 73°23′42″W | New Lebanon | |
| 84 | North Chatham Historic District | North Chatham Historic District | September 4, 2012 (#12000596) | NY 203, County Roads 32 & 17, Depot St., Mill Ln., Bunker Hill & Dom Rds. 42°28′15″N 73°37′54″W | North Chatham | District with 131 contributing buildings and structures, primarily along NY 203. |
| 85 | North Hillsdale Methodist Church | North Hillsdale Methodist Church | October 1, 2010 (#10000811) | 1012 County Rte 21; 42°14′15″N 73°30′29″W | North Hillsdale | |
| 86 | Oak Hill | | June 26, 1979 (#79001573) | North of Linlithgo on Oak Hill Rd. 42°12′00″N 73°50′40″W | Linlithgo | |
| 87 | Olana | Olana | October 15, 1966 (#66000509) | Church Hill, E end of Rip Van Winkle Bridge; 42°12′52″N 73°49′47″W | Greenport | Moorish Revival home of Hudson River School artist Frederick Church |
| 88 | Old Parsonage | Old Parsonage | October 7, 1983 (#83003935) | Buckwheat Bridge Rd. 42°05′32″N 73°49′07″W | Clermont | |
| 89 | Peck House | Peck House | July 22, 1999 (#99000869) | NY 203; 42°28′30″N 73°38′00″W | Chatham | |
| 90 | Persons of Color Cemetery at Kinderhook | Persons of Color Cemetery at Kinderhook | March 22, 2016 (#16000107) | E. of Rothermel Ave. 42°23′44″N 73°42′15″W | Kinderhook | Cemetery established c.1816 for burials of African-Americans. There may have been hundreds of burials; about 15 gravestones survive. |
| 91 | Harriet Phillips Bungalow | Harriet Phillips Bungalow | August 21, 1997 (#97000946) | 438 NY 23B; 42°13′40″N 73°44′58″W | Claverack | Intact 1926 bungalow; possibly a catalog home from a defunct competitor of Sears |
| 92 | Philmont Historic District | Philmont Historic District | March 11, 2024 (#100010025) | Ark St., Band St., Block St., Canal St., Church St., Columbia Ave., Eagle St., Ellsworth St., Elm St., Garden St., Main St., Maple Ave. 42°14′57″N 73°38′57″W | Philmont | |
| 93 | Pine View Farm | Pine View Farm | June 6, 2002 (#02000614) | 567 Collins St. 42°12′59″N 73°30′16″W | Hillsdale | |
| 94 | Rev. Dr. Elbert S. Porter House | Rev. Dr. Elbert S. Porter House | August 21, 1997 (#97000949) | 6163 New York State Route 9H; 42°13′17″N 73°44′03″W | Claverack | |
| 95 | Pratt Homestead | | November 13, 2009 (#09000907) | 866 Route 203; 42°19′44″N 73°33′04″W | Spencertown | |
| 96 | William and Victoria Pulver House | William and Victoria Pulver House | April 6, 2005 (#05000260) | 2329 Cty Rd. 8; 42°05′01″N 73°45′30″W | Snyderville | |
| 97 | Railway Steel Spring Company Foundry and Sand House | Railway Steel Spring Company Foundry and Sand House | May 18, 2026 (#100013005) | 108-110 South Front Street; 42°15′07″N 73°47′55″W | Hudson | 1905 facility which housed several rail-related industrial companies is the last intact rail-related structure remaining near the current station |
| 98 | The Red Rock Monument | | August 19, 2025 (#100012134) | 321 County Route 24; 42°21′27″N 73°30′21″W | Red Rock | |
| 99 | Red Rock Schoolhouse | Red Rock Schoolhouse | October 27, 2022 (#100008311) | 459 Cty. Rd. 24; 42°21′45″N 73°29′48″W | Red Rock | |
| 100 | Reformed Dutch Church of Claverack | Reformed Dutch Church of Claverack | June 21, 2001 (#01000673) | NY 9H, north of NY 23B; 42°13′42″N 73°43′56″W | Claverack | 1767 church, renovated and expanded in the 19th century, is oldest institutional building in county |
| 101 | Requa House | | November 15, 2002 (#02001325) | 9 Requa Rd. 42°27′32″N 73°46′04″W | Stuyvesant | |
| 102 | Richmond Hill | Richmond Hill | July 6, 1988 (#88000917) | CR 31; 42°07′36″N 73°49′11″W | Livingston | |
| 103 | Riders Mills Historic District | Riders Mills Historic District | August 2, 2000 (#00000877) | NY 66, Bachus Rd., Riders Mills Rd. 42°28′43″N 73°33′40″W | Chatham | |
| 104 | Simeon Rockefeller House | | July 2, 2009 (#09000479) | 524 Columbia Co. Rte. 8; 42°07′52″N 73°51′50″W | Germantown vicinity | |
| 105 | Rossman-Prospect Avenue Historic District | Rossman-Prospect Avenue Historic District | October 21, 1985 (#85003364) | Prospect and Rossman Aves. 42°14′40″N 73°46′46″W | Hudson | First planned subdivision in city outside of original grid plan in late 19th century |
| 106 | Rowe-Lant Farm | | March 23, 2010 (#10000099) | 983 NY-295; 42°24′19″N 73°32′16″W | East Chatham | |
| 107 | St. John's Lutheran Church | St. John's Lutheran Church | June 30, 2009 (#09000480) | 1273 Co. Rte. 7; 42°02′58″N 73°38′19″W | Ancram | |
| 108 | St. John's Evangelical Lutheran Church | St. John's Evangelical Lutheran Church | January 11, 2002 (#01001437) | 923 NY 19; 42°05′36″N 73°47′48″W | Livingston | |
| 109 | St. Luke's Church | St. Luke's Church | October 7, 1983 (#83003936) | US 9; 42°05′14″N 73°49′32″W | Clermont | 1857 Gothic Revival church designed by Richard M. Upjohn; no longer in use. |
| 110 | St. Peter's Presbyterian Church and Spencertown Cemetery | St. Peter's Presbyterian Church and Spencertown Cemetery | August 2, 2002 (#02000821) | Cty. Rte. 7, at NY 203; 42°19′20″N 73°32′47″W | Spencertown | 1771 New England-style frame church moved across road in 1826. Cemetery dates to 1760. |
| 111 | R. and W. Scott Ice Company Powerhouse and Ice House Site | | February 21, 1985 (#85000337) | River Rd. 42°21′28″N 73°47′22″W | Stuyvesant | |
| 112 | Silvernail Homestead | Silvernail Homestead | June 11, 2010 (#10000332) | 383 Poole Hill Rd. 42°01′08″N 73°37′11″W | Ancram | |
| 113 | Simons General Store | Simons General Store | April 23, 1973 (#73001171) | Ancram Sq. 42°03′02″N 73°38′16″W | Ancram | |
| 114 | Sixteen Mile District | Sixteen Mile District | March 7, 1979 (#79001571) | West of Clermont along Hudson River; 41°57′12″N 73°55′29″W | Clermont | |
| 115 | Smith Octagon House | | May 19, 2025 (#100011820) | 1250 U.S. Rt. 9; 42°19′42″N 73°45′12″W | Stockport | |
| 116 | Sanford W. and Maude Smith House | Sanford W. and Maude Smith House | February 28, 2020 (#100004999) | 4 Grove St. 42°22′02″N 73°35′27″W | Chatham | 1875 Victorian home renovated in 1906 by Sanford W. Smith, state legislator and judge |
| 117 | Snyderville Schoolhouse | Snyderville Schoolhouse | July 28, 2004 (#04000754) | Cty Rd. 8, north side, west of Green Acres Rd. 42°04′52″N 73°45′10″W | Snyderville | |
| 118 | South Bay Mill | South Bay Mill | February 12, 2021 (#100005701) | 41 Cross St. 42°15′12″N 73°47′45″W | Hudson | Built as a soap and candle factory in 1860 |
| 119 | Spencertown Academy | Spencertown Academy | April 3, 1973 (#73001174) | NY 203, east of the junction with CR 7; 42°19′19″N 73°32′39″W | Spencertown | 1847 Greek Revival schoolhouse used until 1970 |
| 120 | Spencertown Historic District | Spencertown Historic District | May 25, 2018 (#100002508) | NY 203, Elm & South Sts. 42°19′24″N 73°32′46″W | Spencertown | Center of town of Austerlitz, reflecting mid-18th century establishment by settlers from Massachusetts when area was contested between that colony and New York. |
| 121 | Spengler Bridge | Spengler Bridge | February 23, 1973 (#73001172) | Spengler Rd. over Kinderhook Creek; 42°25′51″N 73°35′59″W | Chatham | |
| 122 | Steepletop | Steepletop | November 11, 1971 (#71000534) | Northeast of Austerlitz on E. Hill Rd. 42°19′12″N 73°26′54″W | Austerlitz | Home and farm of poet Edna St. Vincent Millay from 1923 until her death in 1950. Now Millay Colony for the Arts |
| 123 | Stone Jug | Stone Jug | April 20, 1978 (#78001847) | South of Germantown at NY 9G and Jug Rd. 42°06′11″N 73°53′47″W | Germantown | Unusual stone house (with later brick additions) built in 1752 by Lasher family, Palatine immigrants to the area. Center of a farm of 20 acres (81,000 m^{2}) that includes a mid-19th-century farmhouse |
| 124 | Stephen Storm House | Stephen Storm House | January 7, 1998 (#97001616) | 51 NY 217; 42°13′35″N 73°42′53″W | Claverack | Intact 1810 Federal-style house combining urban and rural aspects of style |
| 125 | Stuyvesant Falls Mill District | Stuyvesant Falls Mill District | September 15, 1976 (#76001210) | New St. and SR 22; 42°21′23″N 73°44′03″W | Stuyvesant Falls | |
| 126 | Stuyvesant Landing Historic District | | May 18, 2026 (#100013012) | Roughly located on the east side of the Hudson River, and consists of low-lying lands adjacent to the river, an upland elevated plane to the east, and an intervening steep slope of approximately 140 feet (43 m) in height. 42°23′24″N 73°46′55″W | Stuyvesant | |
| 127 | Stuyvesant Railroad Station | Stuyvesant Railroad Station | January 27, 1999 (#99000055) | Riverview Ave. 42°23′20″N 73°47′01″W | Stuyvesant | |
| 128 | Sweet Homestead | | August 5, 2022 (#100007955) | 582-614 Center Hill Rd. 42°07′03″N 73°33′46″W | Copake | |
| 129 | Taconic State Parkway | Taconic State Parkway | December 8, 2005 (#05001398) | Taconic State Pkwy, from Kensico Dam Plaza N to I-90; 41°50′35″N 73°41′30″W | Gallatin, Taghkanic, Claverack, Ghent, Austerlitz, Chatham | Scenic divided highway planned by Franklin D. Roosevelt for state park access. Built between the 1920s and early 1960s, epitomizing peak period of parkway design. |
| 130 | Teviotdale | Teviotdale | October 10, 1979 (#79003794) | Wire Rd. 42°09′13″N 73°50′26″W | Linlithgo | |
| 131 | Gov. Samuel J. Tilden Monument | Gov. Samuel J. Tilden Monument | July 14, 2006 (#06000573) | Cemetery Rd. 42°28′30″N 73°23′09″W | New Lebanon | |
| 132 | Tracy Memorial Village Hall Complex | Tracy Memorial Village Hall Complex | January 5, 2016 (#15000953) | 77 Main St. 42°21′49″N 73°35′50″W | Chatham | 1913 Neoclassical village hall building launched the career of architect Horace Peaslee |
| 133 | Trinity Episcopal Church | Trinity Episcopal Church | September 2, 1997 (#97000948) | 601 NY 23B; 42°13′22″N 73°44′17″W | Claverack | 1901 Arts and Crafts church now used as residence |
| 134 | Turtle House | Turtle House | April 2, 2001 (#01000309) | 14 Fabiano Blvd. 42°15′38″N 73°46′04″W | Greenport | |
| 135 | Union Station | Union Station | May 1, 1974 (#74001225) | NY 66 at intersection with NY 295; 42°21′42″N 73°35′53″W | Chatham | Union station for the Boston & Albany Railroad, New York Central Railroad/Harlem Division and Rutland Railroad. In its early 20th century heyday, it served the New York-Montreal Green Mountain Flyer, the Boston-Chicago Lake Shore Limited (New York Central train) and the New York-North Adams Berkshire Hills Express. Last had east-west long distance service by Penn Central between Albany and Boston in 1971; and last had commuter service south to New York City in 1972. |
| 136 | US Post Office-Hudson | US Post Office-Hudson | November 17, 1988 (#88002508) | 402 Union St. 42°15′01″N 73°47′22″W | Hudson | Classical detail on front of 1911 building echoes county courthouse across street |
| 137 | Johannis L. Van Alen Farm | | April 26, 1973 (#73001175) | School House Rd. 42°26′10″N 73°44′32″W | Stuyvesant | |
| 138 | Luycas Van Alen House | Luycas Van Alen House | December 24, 1967 (#67000011) | East of Kinderhook on NY 9H off U.S. 9; 42°22′47″N 73°41′45″W | Kinderhook | Well-preserved surviving 1737 Dutch colonial brick farmhouse |
| 139 | Peter Sander Van Alstyne House | Peter Sander Van Alstyne House | July 29, 2021 (#100006760) | 2221 US 9; 42°23′10″N 73°43′02″W | Kinderhook | |
| 140 | Martin Van Buren National Historic Site | Martin Van Buren National Historic Site | October 15, 1966 (#66000510) | East of Kinderhook on NY 9H; Boundary increase (listed July 11, 2012, refnum 12000406): 1013 Old Post Rd. 42°22′11″N 73°42′15″W | Kinderhook | Home of Martin Van Buren; also known as Lindenwald |
| 141 | Jan Van Hoesen House | Jan Van Hoesen House | August 1, 1979 (#79001570) | NY 66; 42°15′22″N 73°45′09″W | Claverack | 1720s Dutch brick house |
| 142 | William W. Van Ness House | William W. Van Ness House | August 8, 1997 (#97000824) | 270 NY 9H; 42°14′22″N 73°43′33″W | Claverack | |
| 143 | Van Rensselaer Lower Manor House | Van Rensselaer Lower Manor House | January 7, 1998 (#97001615) | 103 NY 23B; 42°13′29″N 73°43′32″W | Claverack | Two 18th century stone houses joined in building with major local historical significance |
| 144 | Conyn Van Rensselaer House | Conyn Van Rensselaer House | October 20, 2009 (#09000861) | 644 Spook Rock Rd. 42°12′01″N 73°45′15″W | Claverack | |
| 145 | Henry (Hendrick) I. Van Rensselaer House | | September 16, 1993 (#93000947) | Junction of Yates Rd. and NY 9H/23; 42°11′18″N 73°45′26″W | Greenport | |
| 146 | Jacob Rutsen Van Rensselaer House and Mill Complex | Jacob Rutsen Van Rensselaer House and Mill Complex | September 9, 1982 (#82003352) | NY 23; 42°13′16″N 73°42′39″W | Claverack | |
| 147 | Van Salsbergen House | | November 10, 2010 (#10000915) | 333 Joslen Blvd. 42°16′10″N 73°46′05″W | Hudson vicinity | |
| 148 | James G. Van Valkenburgh House | James G. Van Valkenburgh House | April 11, 2002 (#02000358) | 31 Co. Rd. 13; 42°25′18″N 73°36′30″W | Chatham | |
| 149 | Van Valkenburgh-Isbister Farm | | April 12, 2006 (#06000268) | 1129–1142 Columbia County Rte 22; 42°19′15″N 73°41′28″W | Ghent | |
| 150 | The Wilbor House | The Wilbor House | June 30, 1997 (#97000567) | 0.25 miles (0.40 km) northeast of the junction of I-90 and Thorne Rd. 42°26′43″N 73°33′35″W | Old Chatham | |
| 151 | Wild's Mill Complex | | June 14, 1982 (#82003353) | U.S. 9 and NY 203; 42°24′47″N 73°40′52″W | Valatie | Several former mills, including one five-story brick building built in 1846. Last remaining mill demolished around 1986. |
| 152 | Nathan Wild House | Nathan Wild House | May 30, 1991 (#91000612) | 3007 Main St. 42°24′51″N 73°40′46″W | Valatie | Residence of local prominent figure who owned the Wild's Mill Complex |
| 153 | Elisha Williams House | Elisha Williams House | December 9, 1999 (#99001483) | 7 Aitkin Ave. 42°14′50″N 73°46′24″W | Hudson | 1810 Brick Federal house was home of nine-term state assemblyman and nationally known orator |
| 154 | John S. Williams House and Farm | John S. Williams House and Farm | December 16, 1996 (#96001424) | Shaker Museum Rd., approximately 1 mile (1.6 km) south of the junction with I-90; 42°26′18″N 73°35′06″W | Chatham | |
| 155 | Oliver Wiswall House | | September 4, 1980 (#80002599) | West of Hudson; 42°14′47″N 73°48′34″W | Hudson | |
| 156 | William A. Witbeck House | | December 12, 1994 (#94001371) | Co. Rd. 26A, east of the junction with Gibbons Rd. 42°23′18″N 73°45′35″W | Stuyvesant | |

== Former listing ==
| | Name on the Register | Image | Date listed | Date removed | Location | City or town | Description |
|---|---|---|---|---|---|---|---|
| 1 | General Worth Hotel | | November 4, 1969 (#70000920) | April 7, 1970 | 215 Warren St. | Hudson | Demolished on November 19, 1969. |

== See also ==
- National Register of Historic Places listings in New York
