= Stephen Miller House =

Historic house in New York, United States

- U.S. National Register of Historic Places
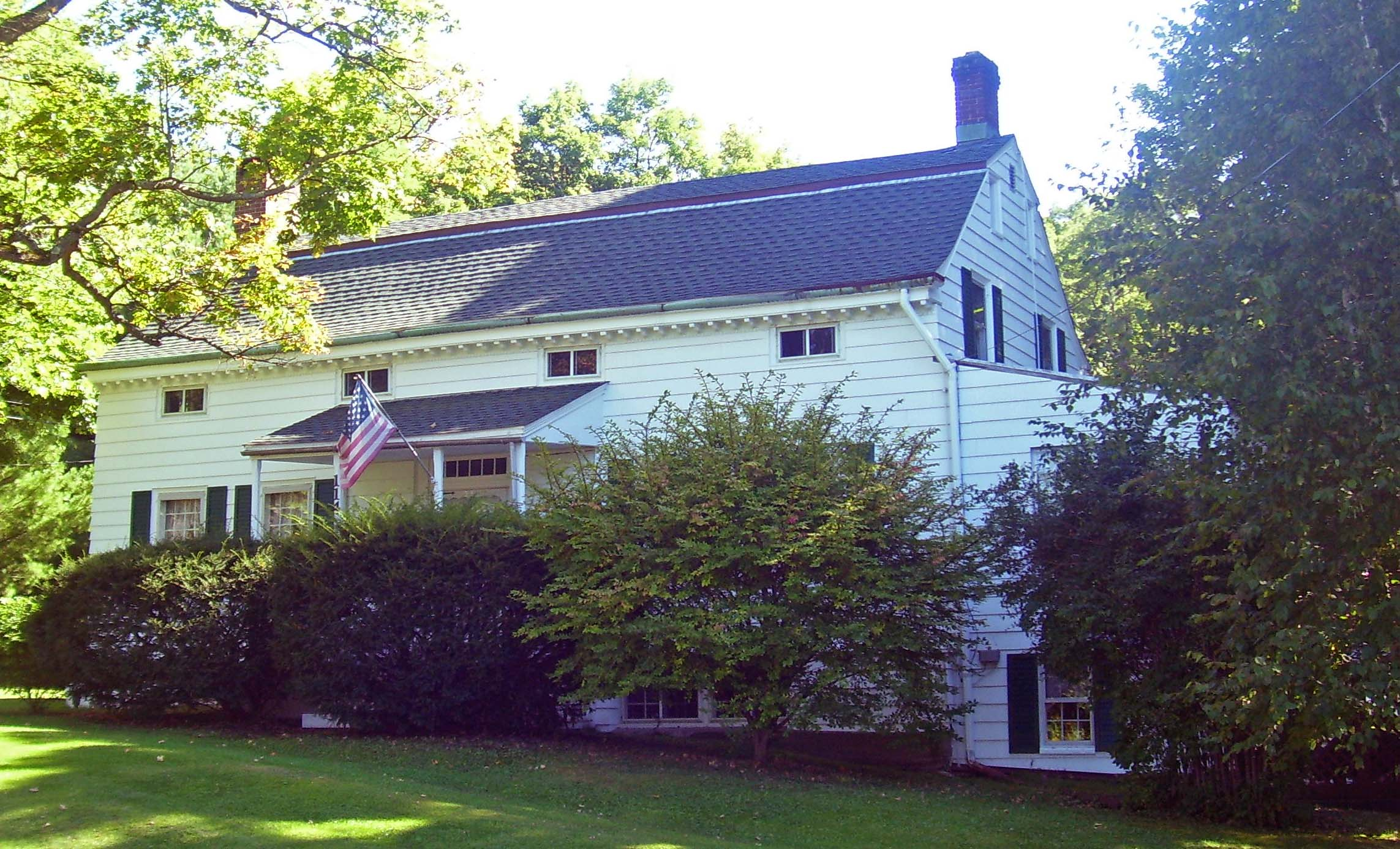
- North elevation and west profile, 2008

- Location within New York Location within the United States
- Interactive map showing the location of Stephen Miller House
- Location: Claverack, NY
- Nearest city: Hudson
- Coordinates: 42°13′28″N 73°43′26″W
- Area: 23.4 acres (9.5 ha)
- Built: ca. 1790
- Architectural style: Federal
- MPS: The Architectural and Historic Resources of the Hamlet of Claverack, Columbia County, New York
- NRHP reference No.: 97000825
- Added to NRHP: August 8, 1997

The Stephen Miller House, also known as the Van Wyck-Miller House, is located along the NY 23 state highway in Claverack, New York, United States. It is a wooden farmhouse dating from the late 18th century.

It is representative of the type of house built by a successful businessman of that region and time period, combining the Federal style with Dutch Colonial elements common in earlier houses in the region. It has remained relatively intact with some later additions. In 1997 it and five other buildings on the ashery Miller ran were listed on the National Register of Historic Places.

== Property ==
The house is on a 23.4-acre (9.5 ha) parcel on the south side of Route 23, at the corner with Van Wyck Lane. There are five other buildings near it, all considered contributing resources to the National Register listing. The land is a mixture of woodlots and fields. The neighborhood, rural with large lots in the area around the farm, becomes residential again to the east. Two other Register-listed properties, the Van Rensselaer Lower Manor House and Dr. Abram Jordan House, are nearby on the opposite side of the road.

The house itself is a two-story, five-by-two-bay frame building on a stone foundation with a bell gambrel roof pierced by two brick chimneys at either end. A dentilled cornice marks the roofline on the north and south elevations. There is a one-story wing on the west. The ground at the north (front) elevation slopes westward, exposing the cellar on that side.

A shed-roofed porch supported by six pillars shelters the main entrance on the north (front) facade. Two small windows flank it; the remaining first-story windows have paneled shutters; eave windows echo them on the second story. In the wing on the west side, a door provides access to the cellar. The windows of that story are similarly treated to those on the first story.

The rear has a similar fenestration to the front but without the porch. On the east elevation is a small Dutch door next to the chimney. It has a small shed-roofed porch as well.

Inside, the entrance, another Dutch door with four-light transom, opens on a central hall. The front rooms are larger than the rear ones. All have fireplaces with early 19th-century mantels. The one in the northwest room has an Arts and Crafts-style tile inlay. The second floor has a similar floor plan, while the basement is divided into several rooms including a modern family room. The west room down there has an original fireplace and carved mantel. All rooms have their original plaster and lath walls and wide planked flooring.

The largest of the outbuildings is the frame store to the east, contemporary to the house. Its gable end and main entrance faces Van Wyck Lane, with a side entrance facing Route 23. It is a two-story frame building with a front porch, rear brick chimney and metal roof.

Behind the house is a brick smokehouse with gabled shingled roof partially built into the ground. Next to it is a frame privy sided in clapboard with a metal roof. Nearby are the largest outbuildings, two barns joined into an L shape. They are frame buildings on stone foundations sided in clapboard with double doors at their main entrances facing the roads. The north gable end has a circular window with eight divided lights.

== History ==
The house was built around 1790 by Miller, son of Cornelius Muller, whose brick Dutch house on the other side of Claverack is also listed on the Register. The younger man was among the first merchants in the community to set up shop on the east side, selling dry goods and buying or accepting as barter ash from recently cleared farmland to extract potash from.

His house is not high in style, but does reflect Miller's commercial success in its large mass and predominantly Federal stylings. The gambrel roof and Dutch door acknowledge the area's Dutch colonial past.

The outbuildings are either contemporary with the house, such as the store building, or added later as the two barns were. The only significant changes to the house have been the addition of the west wing, probably some time later in the 19th century, and the changes to the basement floor plan made by owners in the late 20th century.

== See also ==
- National Register of Historic Places listings in Columbia County, New York
