= Claverack =

Claverack may refer to the following in the U.S. state of New York:

- Claverack, New York, a town in Columbia County
  - Claverack-Red Mills, New York, a census-designated place (CDP) in the above town
- Claverack College, a former school in the above town
- Claverack Creek, a tributary of Stockport Creek
- Claverack Free Library, in the above CDP
