= Stephen Hogeboom House =

Historic house in New York, United States

- U.S. National Register of Historic Places
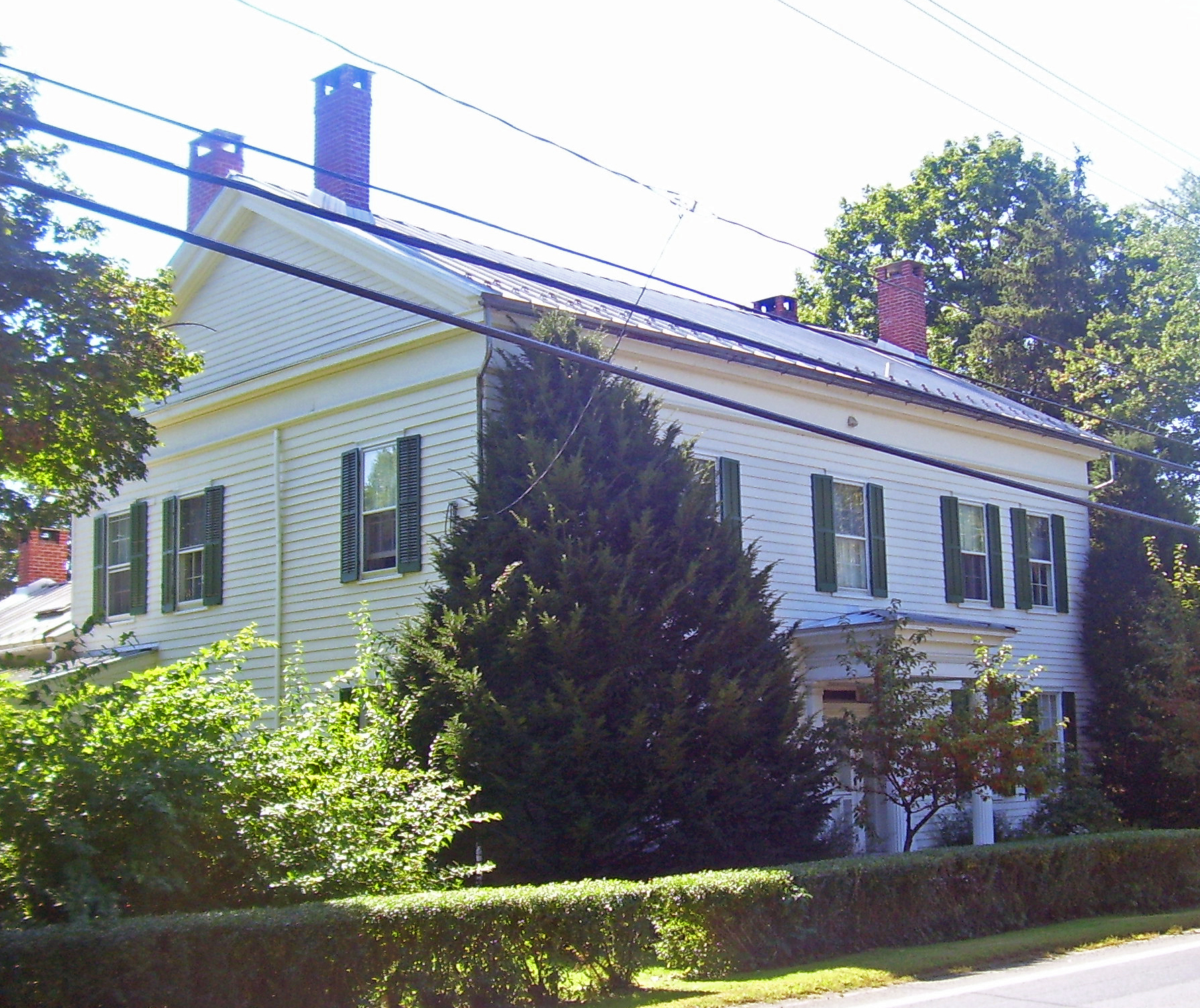
- North elevation and east profile, 2008

- Location within New York Location within the United States
- Interactive map showing the location of Hogeboom House
- Location: Claverack, NY
- Coordinates: 42°13′21″N 73°44′31″W
- Area: 1.1 acres (0.45 ha)
- Built: 1780s
- Architectural style: Georgian
- MPS: The Architectural and Historic Resources of Claverack
- NRHP reference No.: 97000944
- Added to NRHP: 1997

The Stephen Hogeboom House is located on NY 23B in Claverack, New York, United States. It is a frame Georgian-style house built in the late 18th century.

It was renovated in the mid-19th century, with several Greek Revival embellishments, but otherwise remains intact. In 1997 it was listed on the National Register of Historic Places.

== Property ==
The house is on a 1.1-acre (0.45 ha) lot at the southeast corner of Route 23B and Stone Mill Road. It slopes down slightly at the south end toward Claverack Creek. Across the highway is the First Columbia County Courthouse. There are two outbuildings on the property, a garage and a wellhouse. A row of large, mature trees is planted on the east side of the lot. The neighborhood is residential, with houses from different eras.

=== Interior ===
Two stories high, the house is five bays wide and two rooms deep. It is sided in narrow weatherboard. A deep, plain cornice delineates the overhanging eaves of the steeply pitched gabled roof pierced by pairs of brick chimneys at either end near the roof crest.

On the north (front) facade, the centrally located main entrance is sheltered by a Greek Revival portico, with two tapered columns supporting a deeply corniced roof. The paneled door has glass sidelights and transom with a flat arched top, echoed on the window above it. There are two porches on the south (rear) facade, a small shed-roofed modern one and larger, ornate one with scalloped cornice and Regency-style latticework. Four unevenly placed eyebrow windows are on the second story.

=== Exterior ===
Inside, the main entrance opens onto a wide central hallway with pedimented arches on the doors and windows. All the fireplaces have Doric mantels. On the first floor, double doors (hinged on the east and sliding on the west) separate the front and rear rooms. A tall narrow cupboard is built into the entry recess of the northeast parlor.

A plain staircase leads up to the second floor. There, closets separate the front and rear rooms. Paneled doors from the house's original construction open onto the bedrooms. The southeast bedroom's chimney was built to serve a stove; all the other rooms have fireplaces.

Enclosed stairs lead to the attic. It is one large space, running the width of the house with exposed post-and-beam framing under the high roof. Corbels support the chimneys, also exposed, in the gable ends. Two layers of old wallpaper on the rear wall suggest that the space was once servants' quarters.

The cellar is also one large space. Its ceiling framing suggests that double fireplaces now on the side walls were originally located in the center of the house. The floor has supported this observation.

Staircases lead from the cellar and second story to the rear kitchen wing. It has its original cooking hearth, complete with crane, and a brick oven that protrudes slightly from the rear wall. A small pantry made from old panel doors and other reused woodwork is in the passageway to the main block. A steep, turning staircase leads up to the garret.

=== Outbuildings ===
The larger of the two outbuildings, the garage, is a frame building roofed in asphalt on the south side of the house. It is one and a half car widths wide, and accessed from Stone Mill Road. Since it is of more modern construction, it is not considered a contributing resource to the property's historic character.

Closer to the house, near the kitchen door, the wellhouse is considered contributing as it appears it was built during the mid-19th-century renovations. It is frame, with a gabled roof and uses beaded posts and wainscoting.

== History ==
Local tradition has it that Jeremiah Hogeboom built the house in 1784 for his son Stephen, then 40 years old. Historical records, such as property tax rolls, show otherwise. Hogeboom had been married for 20 years at that time, to Hilletje Muller, daughter of Cornelius (whose nearby house is still extant and also on the National Register). Tax rolls in 1779 show him living on a small house near the corner of that property, a house shown on maps as late as 1799. It is thus much more likely that the current house was built after the courthouse across the street, which dates to 1786.

At that time the intersection was the center of not only the hamlet of Claverack but Columbia County as well. Stone Mill and Old roads were the original route of the Albany Post Road, the main north–south route through the county, and combined with the road now followed by routes 23 and 23B made, the main east–west road, it was the crossroads of the county and thus the ideal location for the courthouse until Hudson was designated the new county seat in 1805. The Hogeboom House was equal in scale and form to the courthouse, making it as much of a landmark as that building.

Stephen Hogeboom was active in local politics. He served as Claverack's town supervisor in the late 1780s, and ex officio on the county's Board of Supervisors, then in the state legislature as both an assemblyman and state senator. His son Kilian was also county clerk.

Upon his death in 1814, his will provided that Kilian receive a separate house and property. His daughters and their descendants lived in the house for another 40 years. In 1854, the property was sold to a Peter Best of Stuyvesant for $4,000 ($143,000 in contemporary dollars).

It is likely that it was Best who made the renovations in the then-popular Greek Revival mode. The house's roof is pitched more steeply than usual for that style (as the narrow weatherboard siding is unusual for Claverack), but otherwise it lent itself well to the renovations. The fireplaces were moved from the center of the basement to the walls, the upstairs closets installed and the rear porch and wellhouse added. The kitchen wing remained unaltered. A front portico that echoes one installed in a contemporary renovation to the courthouse was also added.

Best's family lived in the house for the remainder of the 19th century. Throughout the 20th and 21st, it has remained a private residence in the hands of several owners. The garage has been added, as well as the smaller, shed-roofed rear porch. There have been no other significant changes to the building.

== See also ==
- National Register of Historic Places listings in Columbia County, New York
