= Trinity Episcopal Church (Claverack, New York) =

Historic church in New York, United States

- U.S. National Register of Historic Places
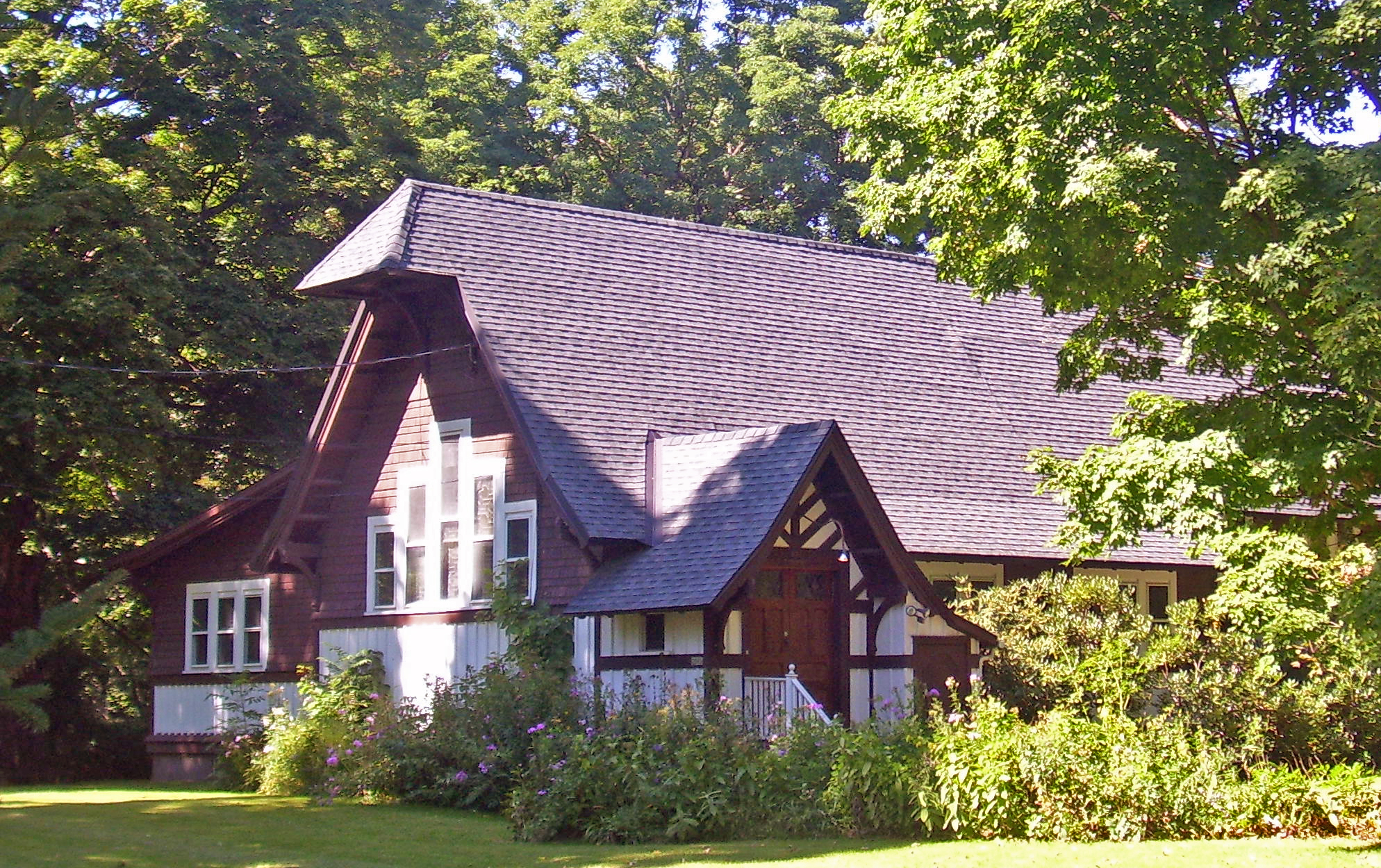
- South elevation and east profile, 2008
- Location: Claverack, NY
- Nearest city: Hudson
- Coordinates: 42°13′22″N 73°44′15″W
- Area: 1.3 acres (5,300 m^{2})
- Built: 1901
- Architectural style: Shingle Style
- MPS: The Architectural and Historic Resources of the Hamlet of Claverack, Columbia County, New York
- NRHP reference No.: 97000948
- Added to NRHP: 1997

The former Trinity Episcopal Church is located on NY 23B in Claverack, New York, United States. It is a Shingle Style church building from the early 20th century.

It replaced the church's second building, destroyed by fire, which had itself been a replacement for another fire-destroyed building. In 1975 the church moved out and sold it. Changes were made to convert it into a residence but it retains its historic integrity. In 1997 it was listed on the National Register of Historic Places.

== Building ==
The former church is on the north side of Route 23B, set back somewhat from the road. It is located near the west side of a 1.3-acre (5,300 m^{2}) lot with tall, mature trees, particularly along the driveway in the center of the lot. To the east along the highway are institutional public buildings such as a school, library and a memorial chapel. To the west are other houses, many from the 18th and centuries. There is one other building, a garage not considered a contributing resource to the National Register listing.

The building itself is a frame structure on a stone foundation capped by a steeply pitched gable roof. At the south (front) end, the roof extends to an overhanging hood meant to shelter the bell originally there, a feature called a wolf dak. It is sided in board-and-batten on its lower sections and wood shingles above. A datestone at the corner gives 1901 as the date of construction.

On the southern facade are a group of five stepped stained glass windows. At the south end of the east facade is a projecting vestibule for the main entrance with a gabled roof. One stained glass window lights it from the south. The flat-arched windows along the rest of the profile also retain their stained glass.

There are three similar windows in the north elevation. Their stained glass has been replaced with clear glass. The west side has a small transept, with a stained glass oculus in its gable field above another group of three windows. There is a secondary entrance on the west elevation of the wing. At the south end of the facade is a shed-roofed addition.

Inside, the nave, now the house's main block, is still open to the roof. King post trusses are still visible at either corner of the transept, in natural wood finish contrasting with the dark-stained ceiling. Other wood supports are visible and serve both decorative and structural functions. Open lofts in the front and rear expand the available living space.

== History ==
There was no Episcopal presence in Claverack, whose population descended predominantly from Dutch settlers who worshipped primarily at the Reformed Dutch Church, until 1853. That year The Rev. Fred T. Tiffany came to the hamlet as a missionary. He gained enough followers to formally establish a parish three years later, in 1856, which he served as rector.

Two years after that, the parish raised $5,000 ($186,000 in contemporary dollars) to build a church on the current site, land donated by the Philip family. The cellar of the current church suggests it had a similar footprint. Tiffany died in 1863, three years before the church was finished and consecrated. By then the church had replaced him with the first of several rectors.

Contemporary accounts suggest there may have been two fires in the late 19th century that necessitated the rebuilding of the church. A late 1890s history of Columbia County mentions an 1891 fire, and when the Hudson Daily Register reported on the opening of the 1901 structure it describes the fire as having occurred the previous year.

The current church may have been built by an architect who designed other, similar Episcopal churches elsewhere in the country. He has not been identified; research continues. Aesthetically it is mostly in the Shingle Style of the late 19th century. Its use of medieval lines anticipates some aspects of the American Craftsman style that would become prominent within a decade of its construction.

It was used as a church until 1975. At that point many of the overtly religious aspects of the interior, such as the pews, organ, baptismal font, altar and the three stained glass windows in the rear triptych (the only ones in the building to have religious imagery on them) were sold. Whether the church moved to a new building or simply dissolved is not known.

It was converted into a house shortly thereafter, with great sensitivity to its prior use. A cellar door has been added next to the vestibule on the east side, resulting in the removal of the stained glass window on the north side of that vestibule. There have been no other significant changes to the structure since then.

== See also ==
- National Register of Historic Places listings in Columbia County, New York
