= First Columbia County Courthouse =

Historic house in New York, United States

- U.S. National Register of Historic Places
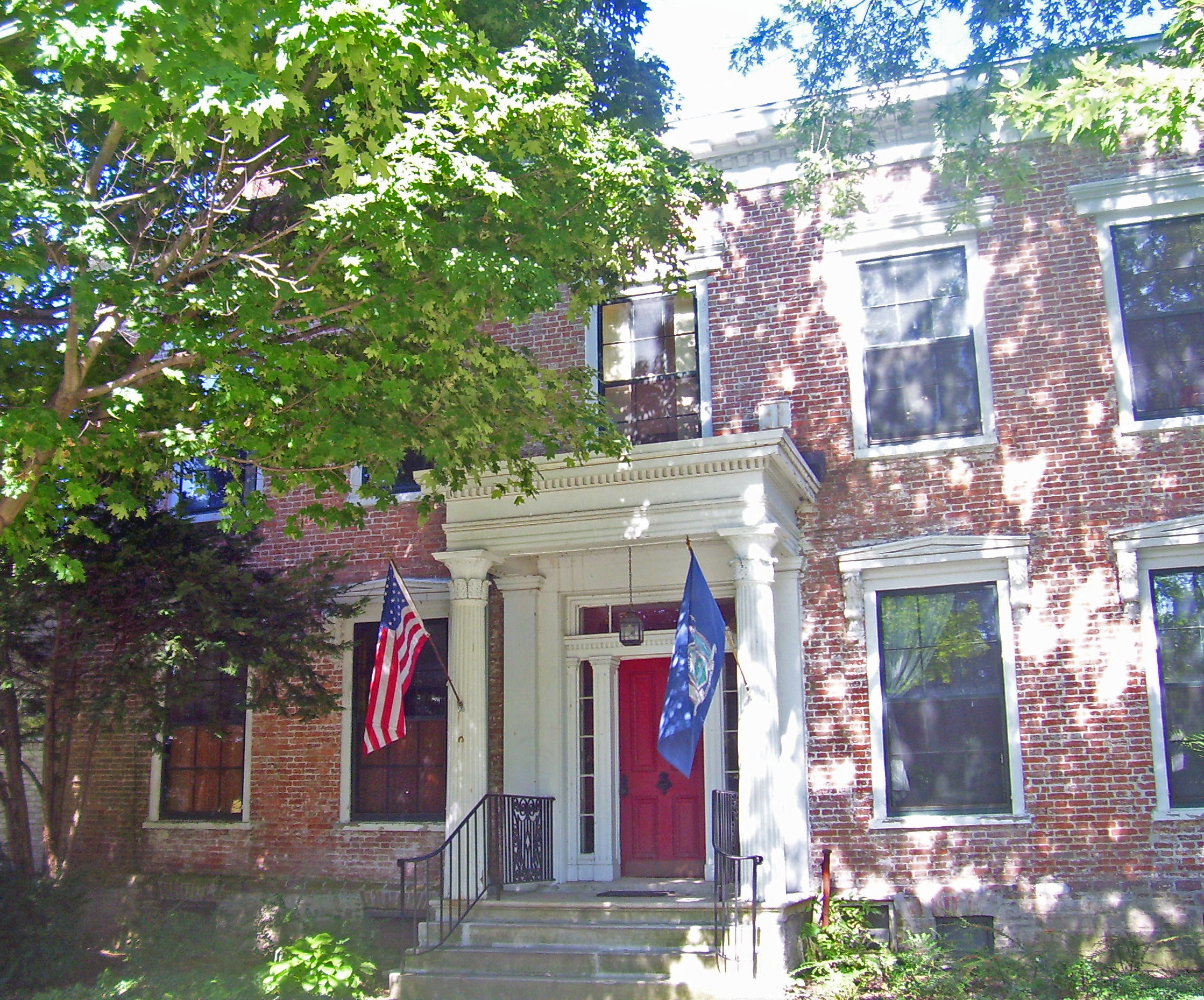
- West elevation, 2008

- Location within New York Location within the United States
- Interactive map showing the location of First Columbia County Courthouse
- Location: Claverack, NY
- Nearest city: Hudson
- Coordinates: 42°13′23″N 73°44′32″W
- Area: 1.5 acres (6,100 m^{2})
- Built: 1786
- Architectural style: Federal
- MPS: The Architectural and Historic Resources of Claverack
- NRHP reference No.: 97001623
- Added to NRHP: 1998

The First Columbia County Courthouse is located along NY 23B near the center of the hamlet of Claverack, New York, United States. It is a brick building in the Federal style constructed in 1786 and renovated in the mid-19th century.

At that time Claverack was the seat of Columbia County. The courthouse was in use for 20 years until nearby Hudson replaced Claverack as the county seat. Martin Van Buren argued cases there, and Alexander Hamilton may have as well. The Harry Croswell libel case, in which a local journalist was criminally charged for his criticism of President Thomas Jefferson, was first tried here.

After its days as a courthouse ended, the building remained in use as a meeting room. It has since been converted into apartments. In 1998 it was listed on the National Register of Historic Places.

== Building ==
The old courthouse is on the north side of Route 23B, at the west corner of Old Lane, across the road from the Stephen Hogeboom House, also on the Register. The neighborhood is residential, with many other 18th and 19th century houses. It sits at the front of a 1.5-acre (6,100 m^{2}) lot. There is one other building, a modern garage, and a structure, a gazebo, on the property. Both of them are of modern construction and thus do not contribute to its historic character.

=== Exterior ===
The courthouse itself is a two-story, five-by-four-bay brick building on a stone foundation. It is topped by a gabled roof clad in seamed metal. Delineating it at the roofline is a broad frieze with modillions and a molded cornice with partial returns.

On the north side is a two-story wing that itself has a two-story frame wing, offset to the west. A one-story, one-room flat-roofed addition is on the west side.

The south (front) facade is dominated by its main entrance. It has a portico with a flat roof and deep cornice supported by two fluted columns. Sidelights and a transom frame the entry, which consists of two Doric posts supporting a lintel with a molded top edge and applied dentils. The four-panel door is framed by flat surrounds and egg-and-dart molding.

On the east there are three windows on the first story and two on the second. The clapboard-filled gable field has a large fanlight. The other two elevations are dominated by their respective wings.

=== Interior ===
The narrow center hall has two rooms of equal size on either side. It once ran the depth of the building but has since been truncated. The brick wing has been extensively remodeled for conversion into an apartment. In its brick wall the space of the old fireplace, now covered over, can still be seen. It has no cellar. The frame addition has also been remodeled.

Considerable support has been added to the cellar. A load-bearing wall runs along the east side paralleling the hallway. Two old chamfered posts have been placed under the southwest room to shore it up.

== History ==
The building was used as a courthouse for the first twenty years of its existence. During that time, it saw many notable lawyers of the day and the beginning of one landmark case. Afterwards, it was used as a meeting house and house, with one owner making significant renovations to it. A century after that, more renovations were made, particularly inside, to convert it into apartments.

=== 1786–1806: Courthouse ===
Columbia County was formed in 1786, with Claverack as its seat. That same year a resident, Gabriel Esselstyne, deeded the land to the county for £20. Local mason William Ludlow began construction in July. According to some accounts it took two years to complete, at a cost of £3,600. The courthouse was located at the junction of two major routes, the old Indian road across the county that later became the toll Columbia Turnpike (today followed by routes 23 and 23B) and the original Albany Post Road.

The court had a small jail annex in the rear, and nearby were a pillory for public whippings and a hanging tree for more serious punishments. The pillory is no longer extant; the location of the hanging tree is not known.

While construction was underway, the first sessions were held in 1787, with Judge Peter Van Ness presiding. Attorneys sworn into the new county's bar included some of the leading lawyers in the state of New York at the time, such as William Peter Van Ness, Ambrose Spencer, Thomas P. Grosvenor and Peter van Schaack, men who later served as judges and public officials of the new state. Martin Van Buren of nearby Kinderhook began his career arguing cases in the courthouse on his way to becoming president. It is very likely that Alexander Hamilton appeared in the building, since he was attorney for his in-laws, who had ongoing litigation in the county over their landholdings in what is now Hillsdale.

In the early years of the 19th century, a landmark case in American libel law was first heard in Claverack. Harry Croswell, a young journalist based in nearby Hudson who supported the Federalist Party, had been attacking President Thomas Jefferson and his supporters in a small news sheet called The Wasp. This led to Ambrose Spencer, by then the state's Attorney General, securing an indictment of Croswell from a grand jury on two charges of violating the Sedition Act in 1803.

Spencer prosecuted the case personally, and Croswell was convicted. He appealed the verdict to what was then known as the New York Supreme Court, the state's highest. In a six-hour oration in Croswell's defense, Hamilton argued that truthful statements could not be libelous. The judges deadlocked, and Croswell was never sentenced or retried. The following year, 1805, the state legislature wrote Hamilton's argument into state law.

That same year, the county seat was moved to Hudson, growing rapidly due to its importance as a whaling center. Cases continued to be heard in Claverack for another year while the new courthouse was built there. Many lawyers and judges continued to reside in Claverack since it was a short distance to Hudson and travel between the two communities did not take long.

=== 1807–present ===
The courthouse continued to occupy a place of respect within the community after the courts left. Its high ceilings made it ideal for public meetings, and it was also used for education and dances. In 1843 the county sold it. The new owner, Peter Hoffman, a Brooklyn merchant who had retired upstate, introduced some Greek Revival elements in his renovations, most noticeably the front portico, which echoes that of the Hogeboom house across the street.

Over the rest of the century, a succession of owners, all like Hoffman formerly residents of New York City, moved in. At some point the frame kitchen wing on the rear was added. Some brought other renovations which give the house a mix of urban (the narrow center hall) and rural aspects. It also has the highest levels of ornamentation of any Federal-era house in the county.

After World War II, in the late 1940s, a new owner decided to convert the building into a multiple-unit dwelling. This led to extensive changes to the interior floor plan, particularly in the rear wing. The garage was also added at this time. There have been no modifications since then.

== See also ==
- National Register of Historic Places listings in Columbia County, New York
