= Van Rensselaer Lower Manor House =

Historic house in New York, United States

- Van Rensselaer Lower Manor
- U.S. National Register of Historic Places
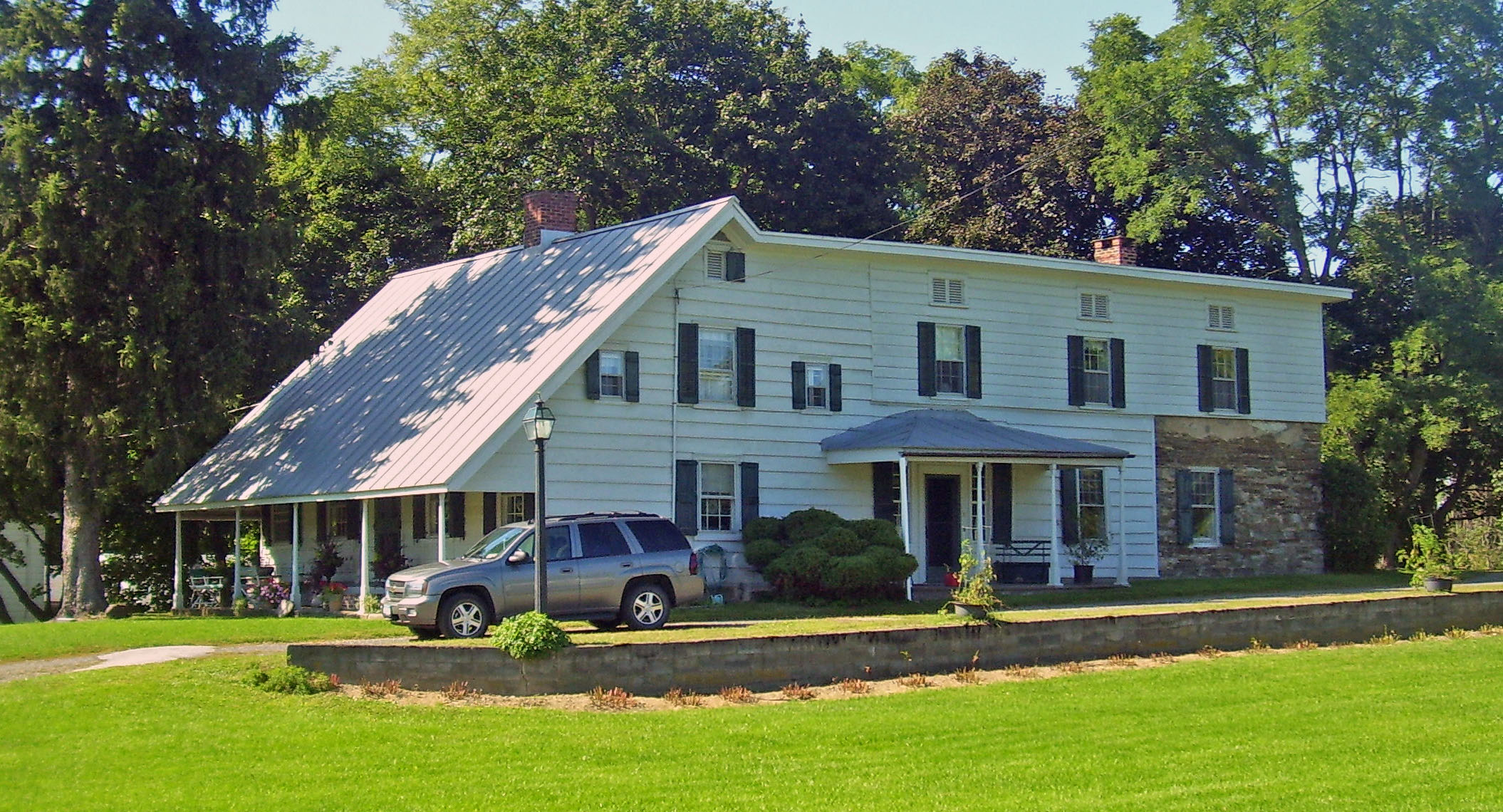
- South elevation and east profile, 2008

- Location within New York Location within the United States
- Location: Claverack, NY
- Nearest city: Hudson
- Coordinates: 42°13′29″N 73°43′32″W
- Area: 1.3 acres (0.53 ha)
- Built: 1715–90
- Architectural style: Colonial
- MPS: The Architectural and Historic Resources of the Hamlet of Claverack, Columbia County, New York
- NRHP reference No.: 97001615
- Added to NRHP: January 7, 1998

The Van Rensselaer Lower Manor is located on the east side of Claverack, New York, United States. State Route 23 passes to the south. The manor is a combination of two 18th-century houses, one stone and the other frame, later connected with a hyphen. They were combined into one building and sided in wood.

One local historian called the result a "growth" that no longer had any architectural merit. It retains much of its original interior layout, finishes and fenestration.

One of the houses was among the earliest built in the region. The structure continued to be expanded. As its name suggests, it was used by the Van Rensselaer family to maintain a presence on the southern boundary of their family lands during the colonial era.

In 1998 the Lower Manor and an associated barn were listed on the National Register of Historic Places.

== Property ==
The house is located on a 1.3-acre (0.53 ha) lot. Route 23 0.8 miles (1.3 km) passes south of this lot, east of its junction with routes 9H and 23B at the center of Claverack. The land slopes up gently to the house from the south and more steeply from the west. There is a barn to the north and a greenhouse/shop to the southeast. An unpaved driveway runs along the east side, between the house and a low retaining wall, to the barn.

The manor is a two-story building, five bays wide by six deep. Its front section has a metal roof that slopes up from a full-width front porch over the course of the two southernmost side bays to a crest pierced by a brick chimney, then drops slightly to remain flat all the way to the rear, where another chimney rises. It is sided in white clapboard, save a small portion on the rear of the first story where the original stonework is visible. The front section has a cellar, accessible from the west side.

A one-story modern kitchen wing has been built on the west side near the south end. All windows have louvered shutters. Small vents are located above the second story windows. In the middle of the east facade on the first story an entrance is sheltered by a hipped-roofed porch supported by chamfered posts.

From the paneled double door on the centrally located main entrance under the front porch, there is a small vestibule that opens into two parlors on either side. Each has a large fireplace and original mantel. A finely molded chair rail runs around both rooms. The kitchen wing has some exposed brick from the original construction.

The main entrance of the connector section, at the east porch, has sidelights. It opens onto a hallway that leads from the front to the rear of the house. An old doorway (now closed) between the hyphen and the original house in the rear has an old board-and-batten door with a carved Greek key lintel. The oldest rooms here have the original hearth and bake oven. An iron kettle with firebox is built into the chimney. The north room appears to have been used as a smokechamber due to its smudged plaster.

The barn, considered a contributing resource to the National Register listing, is located just to the north of the house. It is a frame structure, now secured with vertical wood strips, with metal roof built into the western slope. It has a newer one-story shed-roofed addition. There is a root cellar on the southwest corner.

The greenhouse and flower shop, operated by the owners of the house, is close to Route 23 at the southeast corner of the lot. As it is of modern construction, it is not considered a contributing resource.

== History ==
A late 19th-century account dated the construction of the first house on the site to 1685, when the English granted full manorial rights to the van Rensselaer family. They had originally exercised these rights as patroons under Dutch colonial rule, which ended when the English took over in 1674.

Later research suggests that date is thirty years too early and that the original house, whose stones are still visible at the rear, was built in 1715 by Samuel ten Broeck and his wife Catherine van Rensselaer. Her father had inherited the Claverack portion of the manor. It was used to collect rents and manage other tenant affairs. The family divided their time between Claverack and Albany.

The family remained resident there for the rest of the century. Sometime after the Revolution, as the semi-feudal land ownership arrangements left over from the colonial era were giving way to relationships more compatible with democracy, the manor became the residence of members of another locally prominent family, the Mesicks. As the patroonship was abolished, they lived there as leaseholders until apparently purchasing the property in the 1810s. A Mesick descendant still owns the house.

In 1790 a frame house was built in the front. Its steeply pitched roof still survives as the front facade. It is very similar to Flemish-style houses built further south in New York and New Jersey, lacking only the flaring of the roof over the porch. Around that time a hyphen was built to connect the two.

The barn was built around 1825. In the early 20th century expansions to both the hyphen and the older house created the second story and put the house into its present form. As a result, one contemporary local historian disparaged the house as a "growth", with no remaining architectural unity.

== See also ==
- National Register of Historic Places listings in Columbia County, New York
