= Harmon Miller House =

Historic house in New York, United States

- U.S. National Register of Historic Places
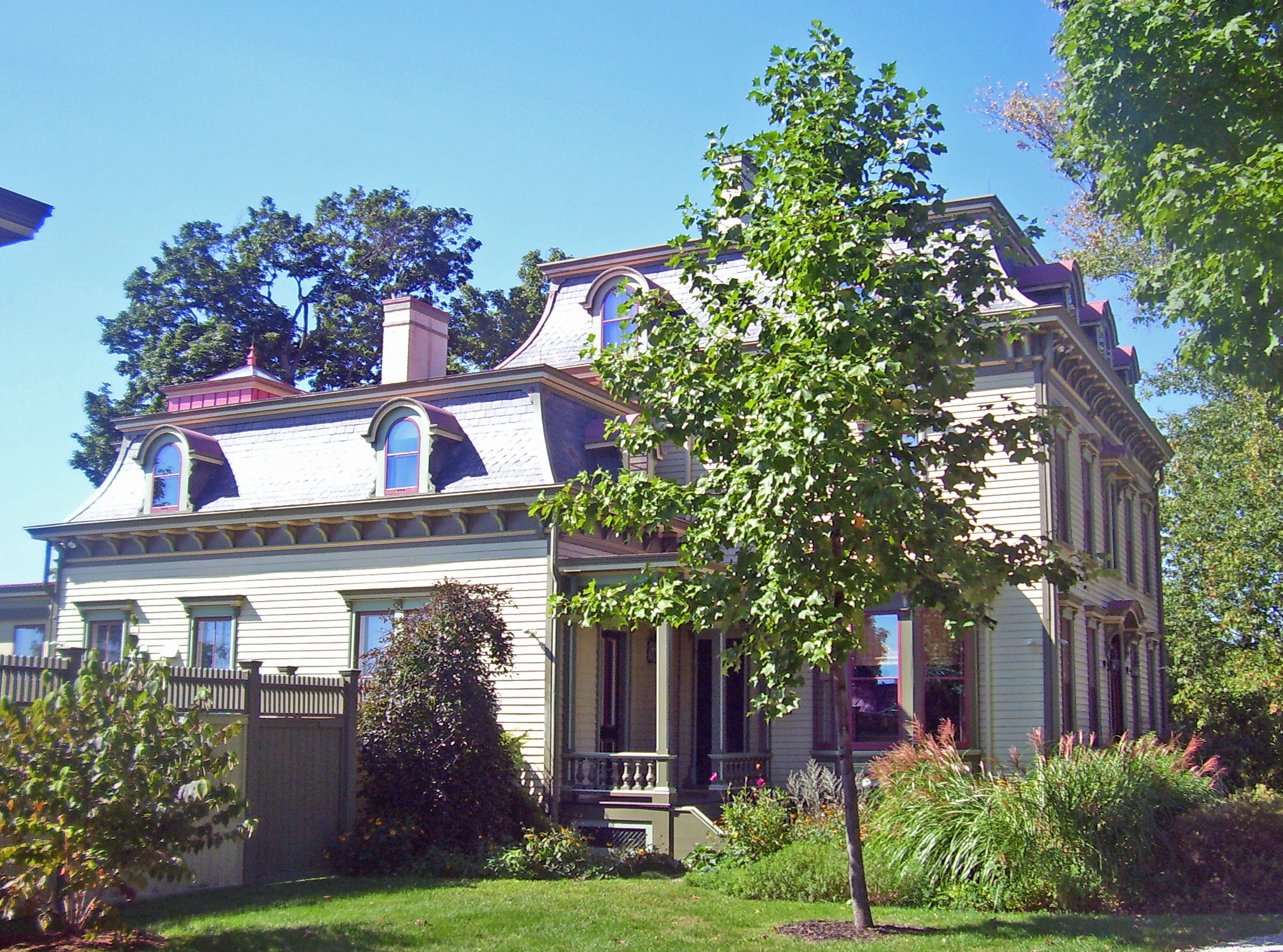
- South profile and east elevation, 2008

- Location within New York Location within the United States
- Interactive map showing the location of Harmon Miller House
- Location: Claverack, NY
- Nearest city: Hudson
- Coordinates: 42°13′6″N 73°43′55″W
- Area: 42 acres (17 ha)
- Built: 1878
- Architect: James McClure
- Architectural style: Second Empire
- MPS: The Architectural and Historic Resources of the Hamlet of Claverack, Columbia County, New York
- NRHP reference No.: 97000827
- Added to NRHP: 1997

The Harmon Miller House, also known as Brookbound, is located on NY 23/9H on the south edge of Claverack, New York, United States. It is a wooden house on a medium-sized farm built in the 1870s.

It is one of the few buildings in the Second Empire architectural style in the Claverack area. In 1997 it was listed on the National Register of Historic Places.

== Property ==
The house, bought by Martin Davidson in 1983 and underwent a 20-year total restoration of the house and property is on the west side of the highway. It is on a small rise surrounded by trees in the middle of 42 acres (17 ha) of fields and meadows. Claverack Creek is on the south. Across the highway are some other homes; the center of Claverack is to the north. In addition to the house there is a small carriage barn to the south.

The house itself is a two-and-a-half-story, five-by-two-bay frame building on a brick foundation with a concave mansard roof covered in slate with an overhanging bracketed eave. A one-and-a-half-story side wing wraps around the south and west sides of the building.

On the east (front) facade, the main entrance is centrally located. Wood steps with a balustrade lead up to it, and consoles support a small sheltering hood. Above it is a double window with similar treatment. All the windows have cornices – molded and flat on the first story, rounded on the second. The roof has three arched dormer windows, with the central one having a pair of windows.

The north facade has a projecting bay window in its easternmost bay. The two dormers on the roof have a chimney in the middle. The south side has a similar treatment without the chimney. Another bay window is on the rear next to the porch, with a flat bracketed roof supported by chamfered posts. There are three dormers on the upper level on this side.

The wing is similar to the main house in materials. It has a full-width enclosed porch on the west. A tower with four-segment window band and a similar slate-covered mansard roof, rises from the central bay. The east elevation, where the entrance is, has an open porch.

From the main entrance, paired doors with etched glass panels set in a segmental arched frame, there is a central hall with staircase. To its north is a large parlor with a small alcove in its rear wall. A kitchen in the wing has been enlarged. The 6 bedrooms on the second floor have been reduced to 4 bedrooms, with a new master bedroom made by combining 3 of the original bedrooms with. Walls have been removed from servants' quarters in the attic to create one large ballroom space. Many original finishes survive, including the plaster, flooring, marble and wood mantelpieces and woodwork such as the walnut balustrade and newel on the main stair.

The carriage barn is sided in clapboard and topped with a slate mansard roof. Its east face has paired, arched entrances and a central round-arched dormer. It is considered a contributing resource to the Register listing.

== History ==
Harmon Miller, a farmer who had built the land his father gave him at his 1854 wedding into 106 acres (43 ha) valued at $15,000 ($537,000 in contemporary dollars) by 1875, hired local architect and builder John McClure to erect Brookbound in 1878. The total cost was $5,366 ($179,021 in contemporary dollars) He lived there until his death in 1905; members of the family remained in the house until selling it to a family in 1953. It remains a private residence and has had a major restoration by the current owner, Marty Davidson, who bought the house in 1983. The total restoration took 20 years including a new slate roof, a back porch added, plus a breakfast room, and French doors above with a skylight which are now part of the master bedroom. In the house a staircase to the lower level was removed and a new one added in the center hall. The original carriage house from 1878 was moved to align with the front of the house when a 75-foot lap pool was added and became the pool house. This was done in 2003. A new 2,750 sq ft carriage house was added in 2000 just west of the house.

== See also ==
- National Register of Historic Places listings in Columbia County, New York
