= Houses at 37–47 North Fifth Street =

Historic houses in New York, United States

- U.S. National Register of Historic Places
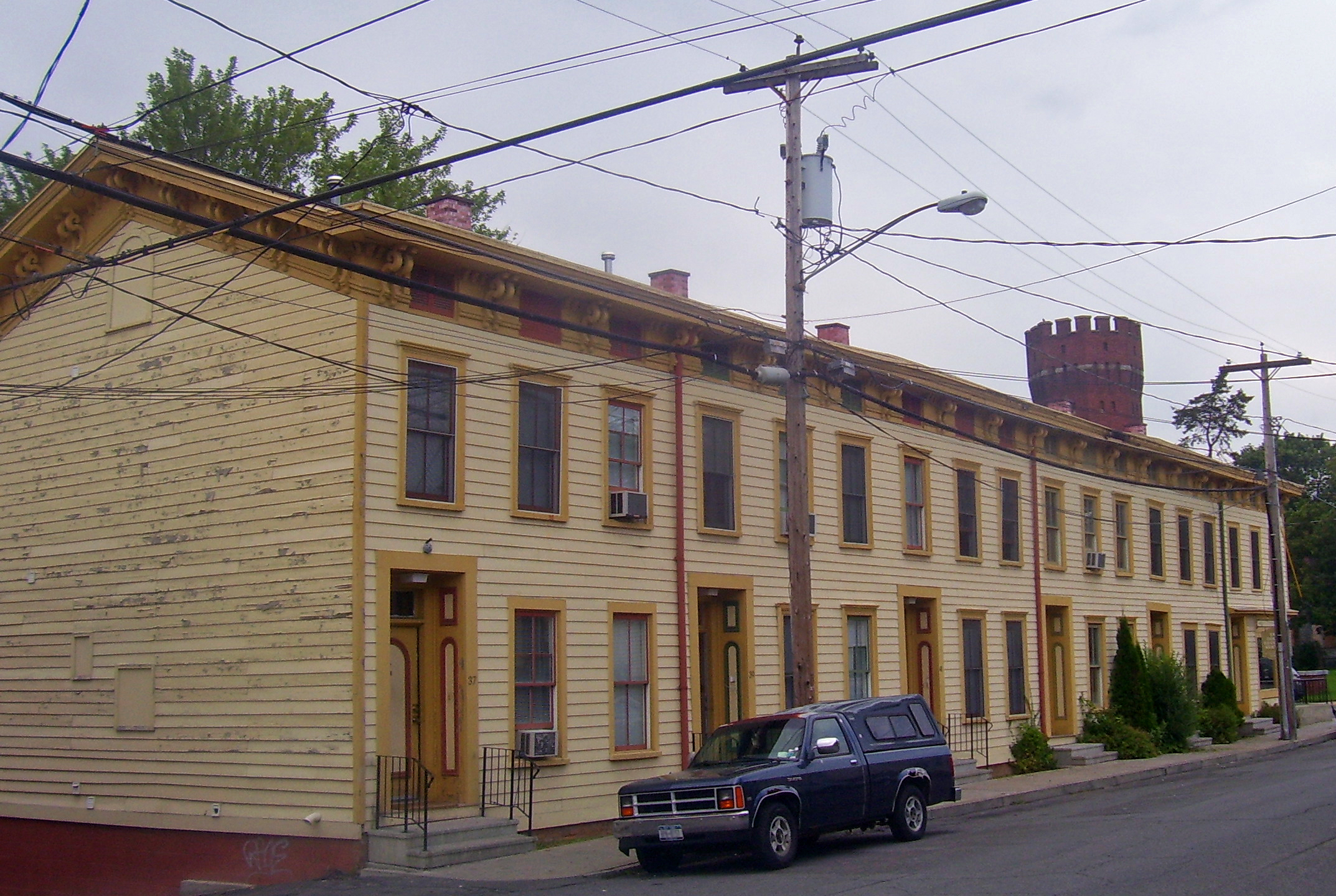
- South profile and east elevation, 2008
- Location: Hudson, New York
- Coordinates: 42°15′02″N 73°47′07″W
- Built: ca. 1870
- Architect: Freeman Coons
- Architectural style: Italianate
- NRHP reference No.: 03001142
- Added to NRHP: 2003

The houses at 37–47 North Fifth Street in Hudson, New York, United States, are a row of six Italianate buildings. They were built around 1870 by Freeman Coons, a local builder.

They are an intact example of late 19th-century worker housing in the city, restored at the end of the 20th century by a local community housing group after decades of neglect. In 2003 they were listed on the National Register of Historic Places. They are currently used by a local drug rehabilitation program.

== Property ==
Five of the row's six houses are identical two-story, three-bay frame structures with a continuous gable roof shingled in asphalt. They have distinctive Italianate features such as bracketed cornices, two-over-two sash windows and paneled entrance reveals.

All the east (front) facades are sided in clapboard, and all windows have paired louvered shutters. The basement on the west elevation is exposed, giving the appearance of a third story. On the inside, they are divided into two or three apartments, some with only a single room.

The exception to the plan is 47 North Fifth, which is three stories high and twice as deep, with its exposed basement giving it an apparent fourth floor. On its north side is a wraparound storefront, topped by a rounded louvered vent in the gable end. There are two flat-roofed additions, one a single story and the other two, on this end. Both have dentilled cornices.

== History ==
Whaling, the industry that had started Hudson, had declined by the mid-19th century. Manufacturing began to replace it, requiring more labor and growing the city's population. These workers needed housing. The city's grid plan was mostly developed but there were still open spaces on its edges, near the factories.

In the years after the Civil War, local builder Freeman Coons and his partners, a local family-owned lumber business, bought the land on the undeveloped section of North Fifth north of State Street. They built the houses, which they intended to be rental properties, between 1869 and 1871 in a vernacular take on the then-popular Italianate architectural style, and then sold them.

The 1870 census records three buildings on the row, Nos. 43, 45 and 47, as finished and occupied. Ten years later, however, the 1880 census lists only two. The records from these censuses do show that the occupants at the time were workingmen and their families, as Coons and his partners had intended.

Over the next century, the houses remained intact and unaltered, but went into decline much as the city itself did, even after the nearby downtown rebounded when it attracted antique shops and art galleries following its 1985 designation as a historic district. In the late 1990s Housing Resources of Columbia County (HRCC), whose offices were just around the corner, started the North Fifth Street Revitalization Project to address this "pocket of blight." Its goal was to acquire the neglected properties on the block, including the rowhouses, and restore them to create homeownership opportunities and reverse the downward trends in the neighborhood.

Through a combination of $2 million in state and local grants, HRCC was able to acquire and restore most of the block, including the rowhouses. During this process, it was approached by Twin County Alcohol and Substance Abuse Services, which was looking for both office space and apartments for its clients, recovering addicts who had returned to living independently but still needed outpatient treatment. HRCC decided to adapt the rowhouses for this purpose, eventually creating 6,000 square feet (560 m^{2}) of office space and rooms for Twin County. The work was finished in 2002.

== See also ==
- National Register of Historic Places listings in Columbia County, New York
