= Cornelius S. Muller House =

Historic house in New York, United States

- U.S. National Register of Historic Places
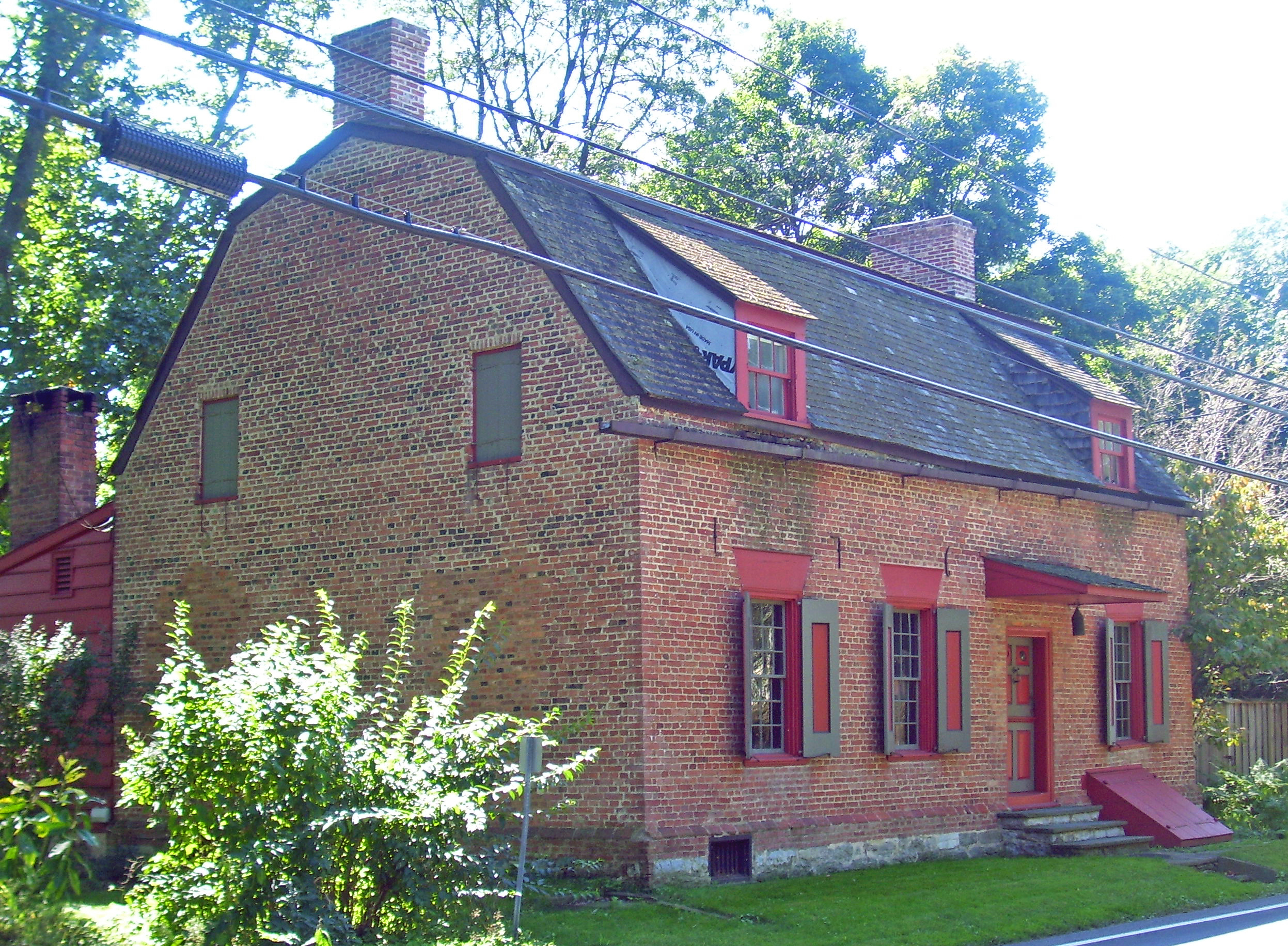
- North elevation and east profile, 2008

- Location within New York Location within the United States
- Interactive map showing the location of Cornelius Muller House
- Location: Claverack, NY
- Nearest city: Hudson
- Coordinates: 42°13′20″N 73°44′20″W
- Area: 5.5 acres (2.2 ha)
- Built: 1767
- MPS: The Architectural and Historic Resources of the Hamlet of Claverack, Columbia County, New York
- NRHP reference No.: 97000823
- Added to NRHP: 1997

The Cornelius S. Muller House is located along NY 23B in Claverack, New York, United States. It is a pre-Revolutionary brick house in a Dutch Colonial style with some English influences.

During the Revolutionary War, it was the meeting place of the local Committee of Safety and a site for courts martial. In 1840 it was renovated, but it has otherwise remained intact from its original time period. In 1997 it was listed on the National Register of Historic Places.

== Property ==
The house is on the south side of Route 23B, along the north side of a 5.5-acre (2.2 ha) lot, the remnant of the former farm. It is very close to the roadway. The neighborhood is residential, with many tall trees and other houses of 18th and 19th century construction. Across the street is the former Trinity Episcopal Church, an early-20th-century building now listed on the Register as well. There is one small outbuilding in the rear, considered a contributing resource to the house's Register listing.

The house itself is a 1½-story, two-by-four-bay structure with brick walls in an English cross bond on a stone-and-brick foundation. It is topped by a gambrel roof clad in wood shingles pierced by two shed dormer windows on the ends with two brick chimneys above either one. On the rear a one-story addition sided in clapboard runs the length of the house.

On the north (front) façade the gray and red paneled Dutch door that serves as the main entrance is located in the second bay from the west. It is sheltered by a replica stoop, with a set of small stone steps leading up to it. The windows all have splayed wood lintels, painted red, and paneled shutters in gray and red, matching the door. Between the bays are a set of metal anchors forming the numbers "1767". Below the westernmost bay is the cellar door, with a small barred window looking into it below the eastern bay. The east and west profiles both have only two windows, both on the attic level

Inside, the main entrance leads into the eastern of the two rooms on the first story. It has an enclosed staircase in the southeast corner, and a fireplace surrounded by raised wooden panelling. The eastern room has exposed beaded ceiling beams and a partially jambed fireplace. Some of the house's original red clay floor tiles are in the hearth.

The attic has had its layout modified since the original construction. It has the original wide plank wood flooring and the original lath and plaster walls.

A 1½-story surviving outbuilding is to the rear of the house. It is built of heavy timber frame on a stone foundation, sided in clapboard and roofed in metal. Since it is likely related to the original agricultural use of the property, it is considered a contributing resource to the house's historic character.

== History ==
There were many Mullers, a family descended from both Dutch and Palatine German settlers in the region, in Claverack in the 19th century. Maps later in that era indicate clearly that this parcel was that of Cornelius S. Muller. Unlike most of his neighbors, he supported the Revolution and was a member of the local Committee of Safety, hosting their meetings. Courts martial were also held there, and those who did not pay fines were imprisoned in the cellar.

The house shows signs of the growing English influence on Dutch vernacular architecture in the Hudson Valley in the later 18th century. Early Dutch houses in the region were made of rubblestone and had steep gabled roofs, like the Bronck House, a National Historic Landmark across the Hudson River in Coxsackie. Cornelius Muller's House substitutes an English gambrel roof and takes advantage of the greater availability of brick by that time. It retains the asymmetrical entrance placement, and the short width, of early Dutch houses. The division of the interior into two rooms, as opposed to leaving the whole space open and undivided, is also a sign of English influence.

The Muller family lived there for several generations. Around 1840, the contributing outbuilding was erected. In the late 20th century, prior to its listing on the Register, a new owner restored the house using surviving original material and an exhibit at the Brooklyn Museum to replicate trim such as the shutters.

== See also ==
- National Register of Historic Places listings in Columbia County, New York
