= Muldor-Miller House =

Historic house in New York, United States

- U.S. National Register of Historic Places
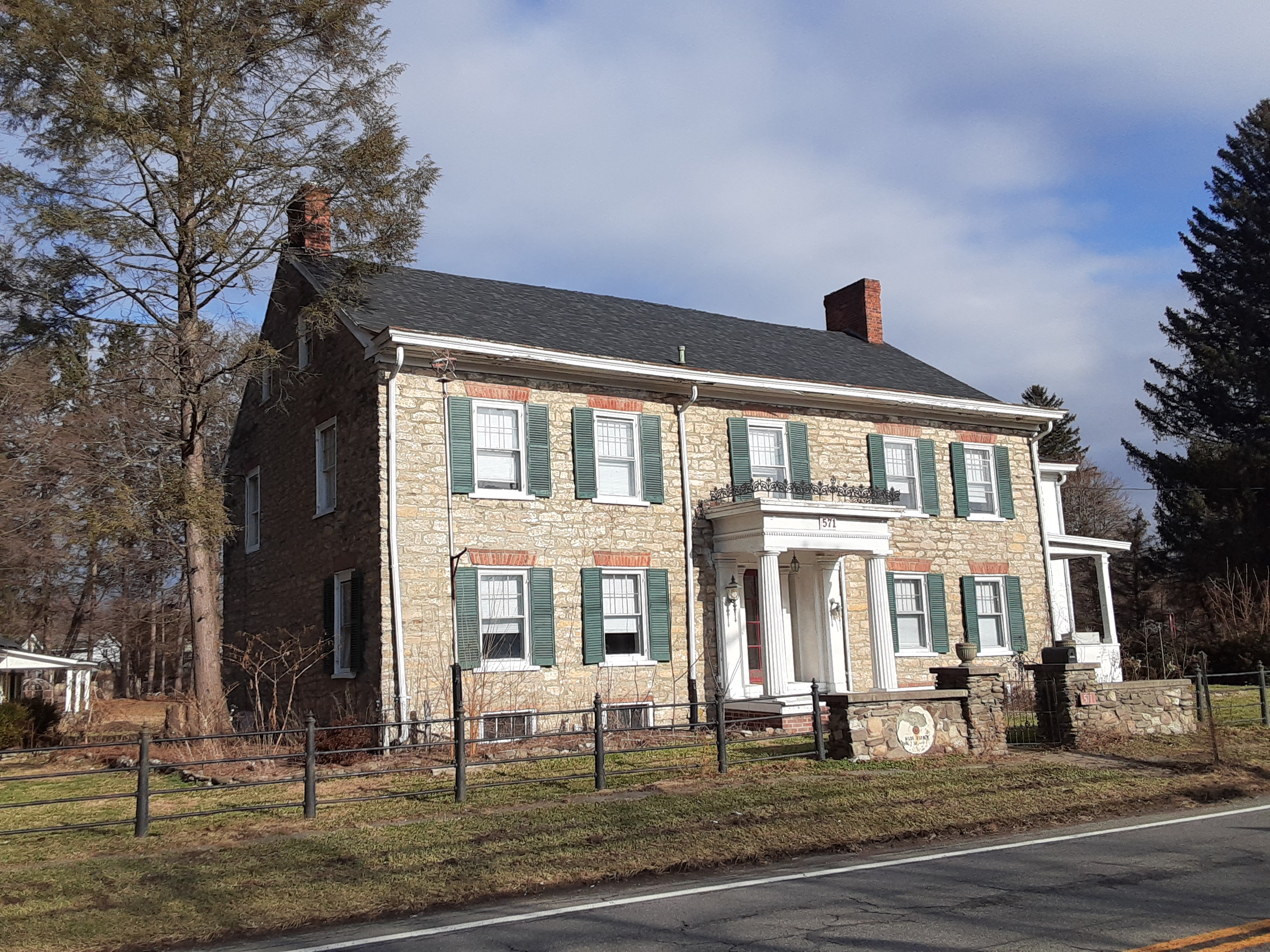

- Location within New York Location within the United States
- Location: 571 NY 23B; Claverack
- Coordinates: 42.2227°N 73.7408°W
- Built: c.1790
- Architectural style: Federal and Greek Revival
- NRHP reference No.: 100008312
- Added to NRHP: October 27 2022

The Muldor-Miller House is a historic stone farmhouse located in Claverack, Columbia County, New York, United States.

== Description and history ==
Built c.1790, it has "unusual stone construction" and "is a rare surviving example of an early house in Claverack."

It is Federal and Greek Revival in style.

It was added to the National Register of Historic Places in 2022.
