= Columbia Turnpike-West Tollhouse =

- U.S. National Register of Historic Places
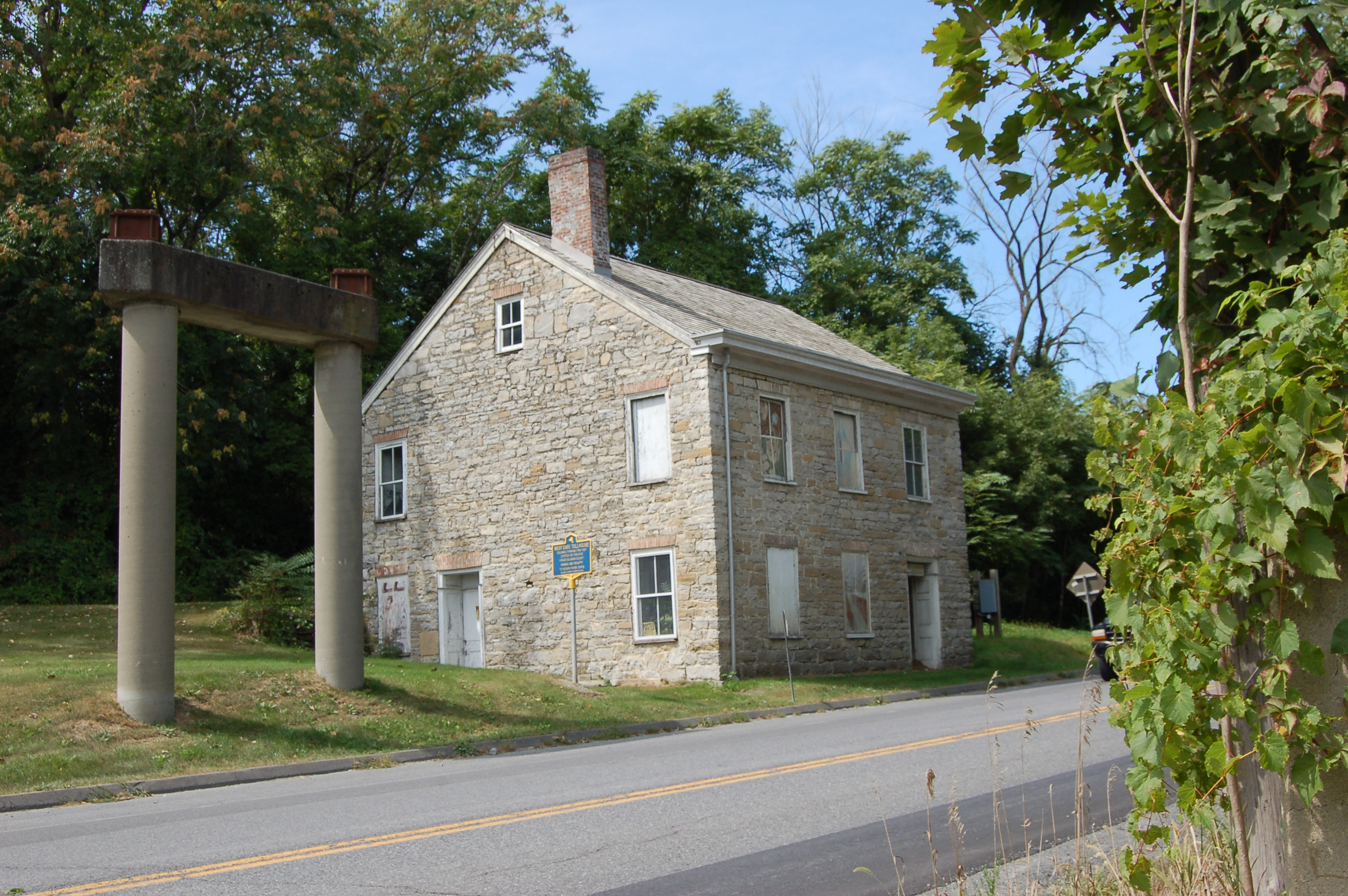
- The former toll house as seen on NY 23B in September 2016.

- Location within New York Location within the United States
- Location: NY 23B, Greenport, New York
- Coordinates: 42°14′21″N 73°45′37″W
- Area: less than one acre
- Built: 1800
- Architectural style: Federal
- NRHP reference No.: 00001571
- Added to NRHP: December 28, 2000

Columbia Turnpike-West Tollhouse is a historic tollhouse located at Greenport in Columbia County, New York. It was built about 1800 and is a 2 1/2-story, three bay square limestone building with a medium pitched gable roof. It operated along the Columbia Turnpike and served as the tollkeeper's residence and in use as such until 1907, when the road was turned over to the county and then the state. The state designated the road as New York State Route 23 until that route was realigned southwest towards the Rip Van Winkle Bridge in the 1950s and the segment along the toll house was redesignated as New York State Route 23B.

It was added to the National Register of Historic Places in 2000.

== See also ==
- Columbia Turnpike-East Tollhouse
