= Old Parsonage =

Historic house in New York, United States

- U.S. National Register of Historic Places
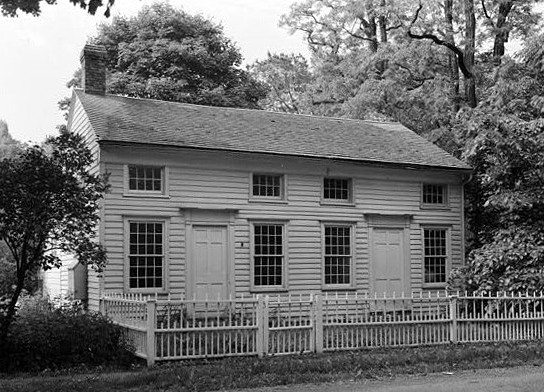
- Old Parsonage, Old Chatham (Columbia County, New York)

- Location within New York Location within the United States
- Location: Buckwheat Bridge Rd., Clermont, New York
- Coordinates: 42°5′32″N 73°49′7″W
- Area: 1 acre (0.40 ha)
- Built: 1867
- MPS: Clermont MRA
- NRHP reference No.: 83003935
- Added to NRHP: October 7, 1983

Old Parsonage is a historic church parsonage on Buckwheat Bridge Road in Clermont, Columbia County, New York. It was constructed in 1867 and is a two-story, three bay frame residence with a jerkinhead metal roof. It features a decorative sawn bargeboard in a picturesque cottage style. Also on the property are a garage and small well house.

It was listed on the National Register of Historic Places in 1983.
