= Claverack Free Library =

- U.S. National Register of Historic Places
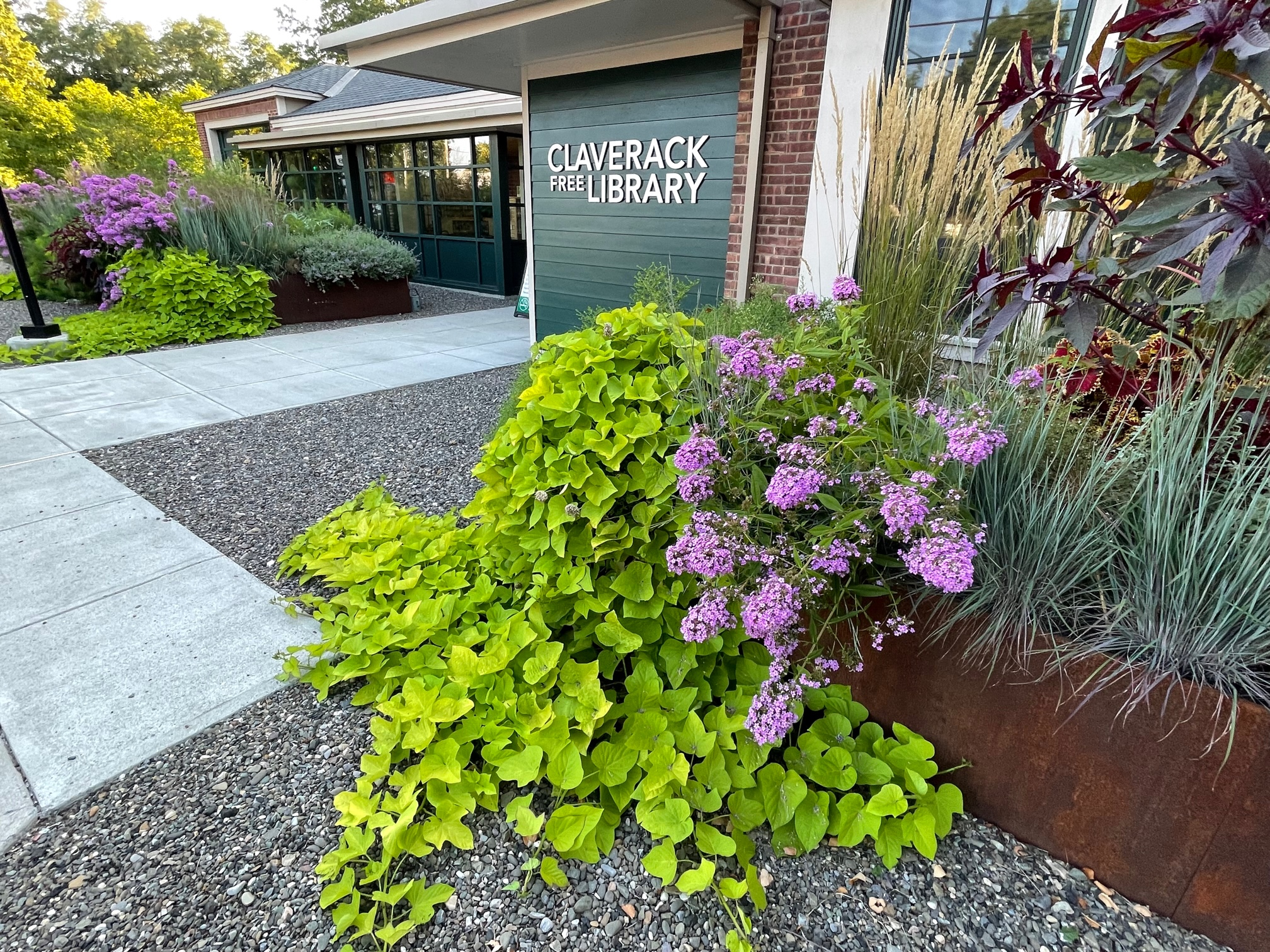
- Location: Claverack-Red Mills, New York
- Nearest city: Hudson
- Coordinates: 42°13′21″N 73°44′7″W
- MPS: The Architectural and Historic Resources of the Hamlet of Claverack, Columbia County, New York
- NRHP reference No.: 97001624
- Added to NRHP: 1998

The Claverack Free Library is located on NY 23B near the center of the hamlet of Claverack-Red Mills, New York, United States. It is located in the renovated former A.B. Shaw Firehouse.

The library itself formally dates to 1891. It had been in several buildings before the expansion of nearby NY 9H forced it to move a short distance west to its current building. In 1998 the library building was listed on the National Register of Historic Places.

The Claverack Free Library is one of the eleven Columbia County public libraries that allow free museum pass requests through their website.

== Current facilities ==
After many years of fundraising and phased construction, the Claverack Free Library moved into its new home in the completely renovated and repurposed A.B. Shaw firehouse at 9 State Route 9H on October 26, 2019. Ultimately, the capital campaign raised $2.8 million from individuals, private foundations, local businesses, and New York State Library Construction grants, and the new library opened free of debt. The new library – fully accessible and modernized with an elevator and energy-efficient systems – now spans 11,000 square feet to house the library’s print and digital collection, a dedicated children’s room, teen space, local history room, and a large, multi-use community and cultural center for enhanced programming and gatherings. The library’s board of trustees is exploring options for the future of the former library building at 629 State Route 23B, which was listed on the National Register of Historic Places in 1998.

== Collections ==
The library is home to resources related to the history of the town of Claverack and surrounding areas. The collections include class photos from Claverack School, historical photographs and ephemera from Claverack College, and archival and local history documents.

== Former Building ==
The former library is located on the north side of Route 23B, a short distance west of Route 9H. A row of mature trees screen the building from the latter highway. An unpaved driveway on the west leads to parking in the rear. The new library is located to the north, and a small former elementary school to the west. A gas station is across the road.

The building itself is a single-story, three-bay frame structure on a concrete foundation sided in beaded wideboard and topped with a gabled roof shingled in wood pierced by a brick chimney at the west end. A single-story frame wing is on the west elevation.

Two small brick steps lead to the main entrance in the center of the south (front) facade. It is sheltered by a porch with a pair of Ionic columns supporting an entablature and pediment. The paneled main door is flanked by glass sidelights and topped with a transom. The two windows on either side bay have paneled green shutters.

The east facade has a Palladian window topped by an attic vent. There are three evenly spaced windows on the north (rear) elevation. The west wing, slightly offset from the front, has three windows on the south side and one on the west with similar treatments to the front of the main block.

Inside, the main block has an open, vaulted ceiling. At its west end, lit by the Palladian window, is a fireplace and chimney breast with ornate moldings inspired by 18th century originals. The west wing is partitioned into two spaces. The front one is the children's room; the rear has most of the library's stacks.

== History ==
The library began informally in the parlors of the nearby Oakledge mansion sometime in the 1880s. Later it moved to an old stone house across what is now Route 9H from the current building. In 1891 it was formally organized as the Claverack Free Library and Reading Room Association.

That organization soon bought the 1.5-acre (6,100 m^{2}) lot where the current structure is located. An old store that had also served as a post office was converted into the first dedicated library building. It remained adequate for many years, but in the 1920s began to show its age.

Forty years later, in 1931, the state Highway Department was planning to expand Route 9H, an eastern loop from US 9 between Bell Pond to the south and Kinderhook to the north that avoids the city of Hudson. It would be necessary to condemn the library building, and after several months of negotiations the association accepted an offer of $5,000 ($118,000 in contemporary dollars). This would later rise to almost the full $7,800 it would cost to build the present library ($184,000 in contemporary dollars). The association turned to alumni of Claverack College, closed 30 years earlier, to make up the difference. It rented space in several houses and other locations for the year it took to build the new library.

The association hired Hudson architect Lucius Moore to adapt a design from models sent to them by the state Education Department. They selected a small Colonial Revival building that had been used, and built for a similar cost, by the library in the Long Island community of Bellport. The model was slightly adapted to be more consistent with local buildings from the Colonial era. The wideboard siding is beaded, as is the case on 18th-century Claverack houses, and the roof pitch steeper than the original design.

The first association meeting in the new library was held late in 1932, although the building was not yet quite finished. A thousand-dollar bequest from one local estate paid for the furnishings. Moore bought the bronze sconces on the chimney in New York City at his own expense. The woodwork was custom-milled for the library.

Since its construction, the only significant alteration was the addition of the west wing in 1950. Moore was still practicing, and designed it to be completely sympathetic to the original building. The local Lions Club donated money for the lighting of the new wing.

== See also ==
- National Register of Historic Places listings in Columbia County, New York
- Mid-Hudson Library System
