= Crow Hill =

Historic house in New York, United States

- U.S. National Register of Historic Places
- Location within New York Location within the United States
- Nearest city: Kinderhook, New York
- Coordinates: 42°23′22″N 73°41′24″W
- Area: 7 acres (2.8 ha)
- Architectural style: Greek Revival
- NRHP reference No.: 97000412
- Added to NRHP: May 9, 1997

Crow Hill, also known as Charles Whiting Residence, is a historic home located at Kinderhook in Columbia County, New York. It was built in 1839 and is a 1 1/2-story, nearly square and symmetrical, wood-frame dwelling with clapboard siding in the Greek Revival style. It has a hipped roof with cupola centered over the main hall. It was framed with recycled parts of old barns and perhaps earlier homes. Also on the property is a 19th-century wood well house.

It was added to the National Register of Historic Places in 1997.
