= South Bay Mill =

Historic mill in New York, United States

- U.S. National Register of Historic Places
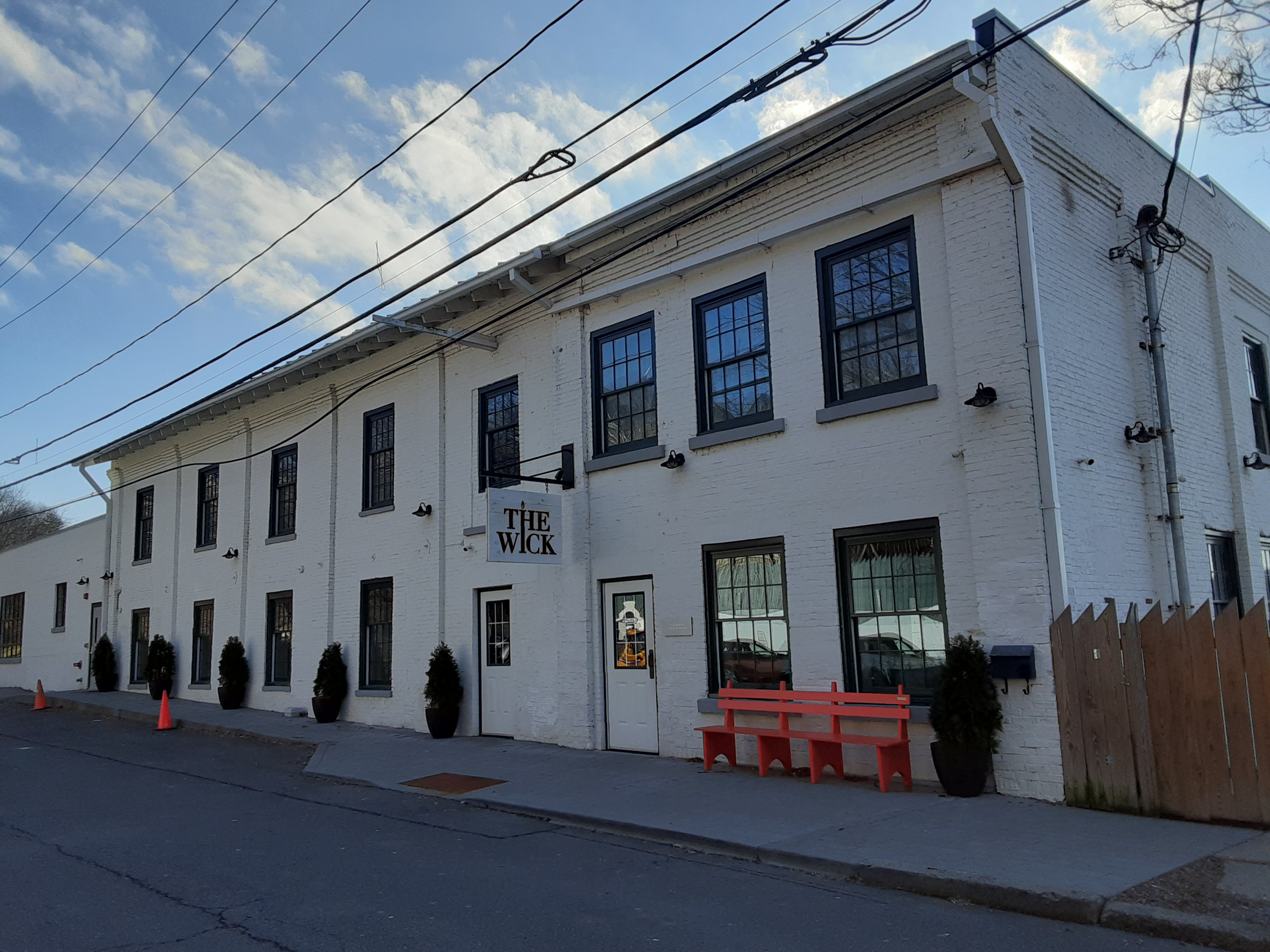

- Location within New York Location within the United States
- Location: 41 Cross St. Hudson
- Coordinates: 42.2532°N 73.7959°W
- NRHP reference No.: 100005701
- Added to NRHP: February 12, 2022

The South Bay Mill is a historic mill located in Hudson, Columbia County, New York, United States.

== Description and history ==
It "was built as a soap and candle factory in 1860 near the city's thriving Hudson River harbor trade and saw a number of industrial uses in the ensuing decades, lastly as a large-scale electronic goods manufactory...."

It was added to the National Register of Historic Places in 2022.
