= Copake United Methodist Church and Copake Cemetery =

Historic site in Columbia County, New York, US

- U.S. National Register of Historic Places
- Location within New York Location within the United States
- Location: Church St., Copake, New York
- Coordinates: 42°6′14″N 73°33′5″W
- Area: 9.5 acres (3.8 ha)
- Built: 1757
- Architect: Snyder, Jude (builder)
- Architectural style: Greek Revival
- NRHP reference No.: 07000624
- Added to NRHP: June 27, 2007

Copake United Methodist Church and Copake Cemetery is a historic United Methodist church on Church Street in Copake, Columbia County, New York. The church was built about 1854 and is a one-story, timber frame meeting house style church with Greek Revival style design attributes. It features a stoutly proportioned, four columned Ionic order portico and a two tiered belfry. The church is set within Copake Cemetery. The earliest burial dates to 1757 and most of the stones date to the first decades of the 19th century.

It was listed on the National Register of Historic Places in 2007.
