= Knollcroft =

Historic house in New York, United States

- U.S. National Register of Historic Places
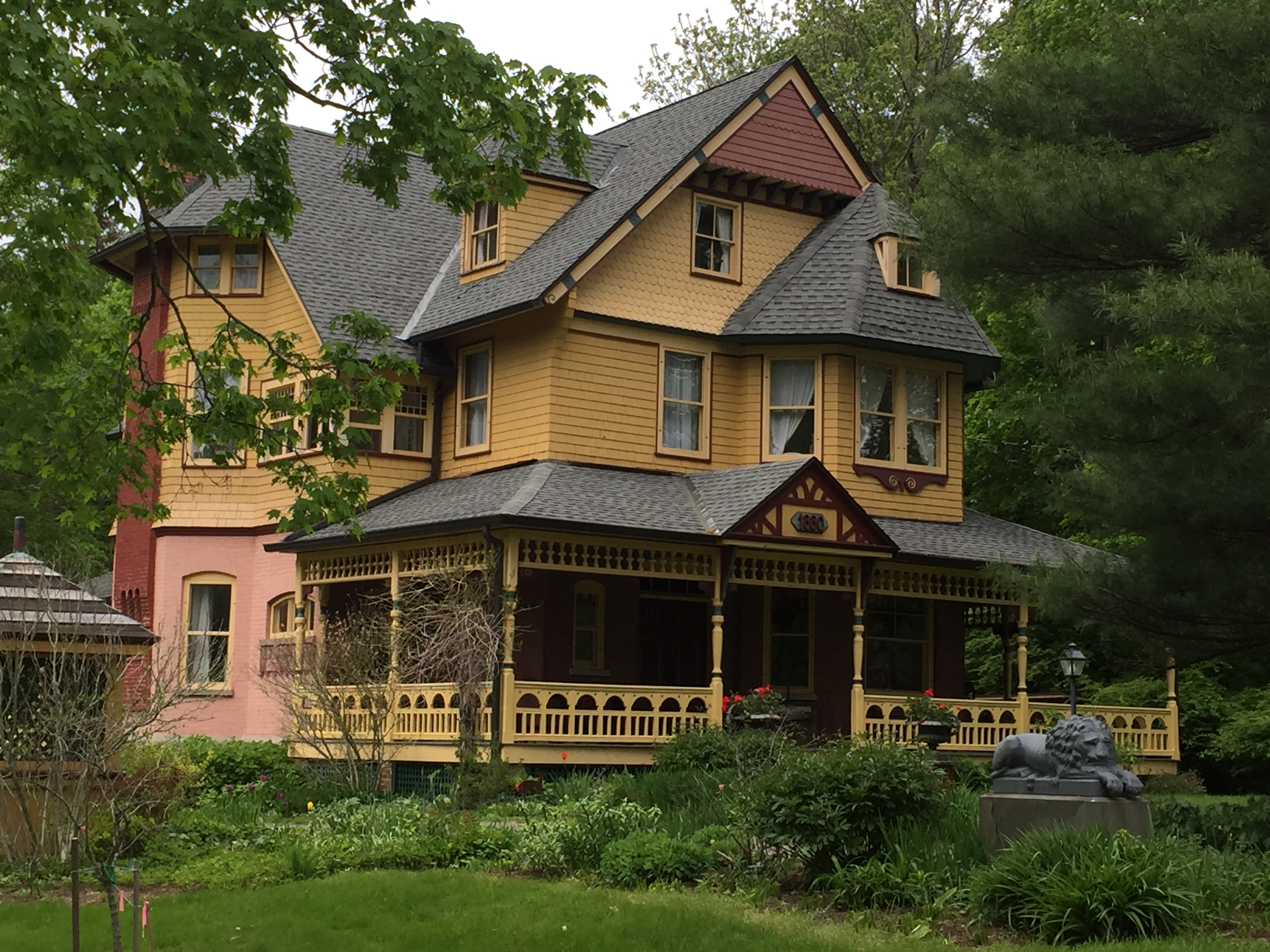

- Location within New York Location within the United States
- Location: CR 9 New Concord, New York
- Coordinates: 42°23′32″N 73°31′51″W
- Area: 24.6 acres (10.0 ha)
- Built: 1880
- Architectural style: Queen Anne
- NRHP reference No.: 85002287
- Added to NRHP: August 14, 1985

Knollcroft is a historic home located at New Concord in Columbia County, New York. It was built in 1880 as a summer retreat. It is a large, two-story brick-and-frame structure designed in the Queen Anne style. It features a two-story, projecting polygonal bay with a hipped roof and a large, deep verandah. Also on the property is a carriage house, well house, and privy.

It was added to the National Register of Historic Places in 1985.
