= Columbia Turnpike-East Tollhouse =

- U.S. National Register of Historic Places
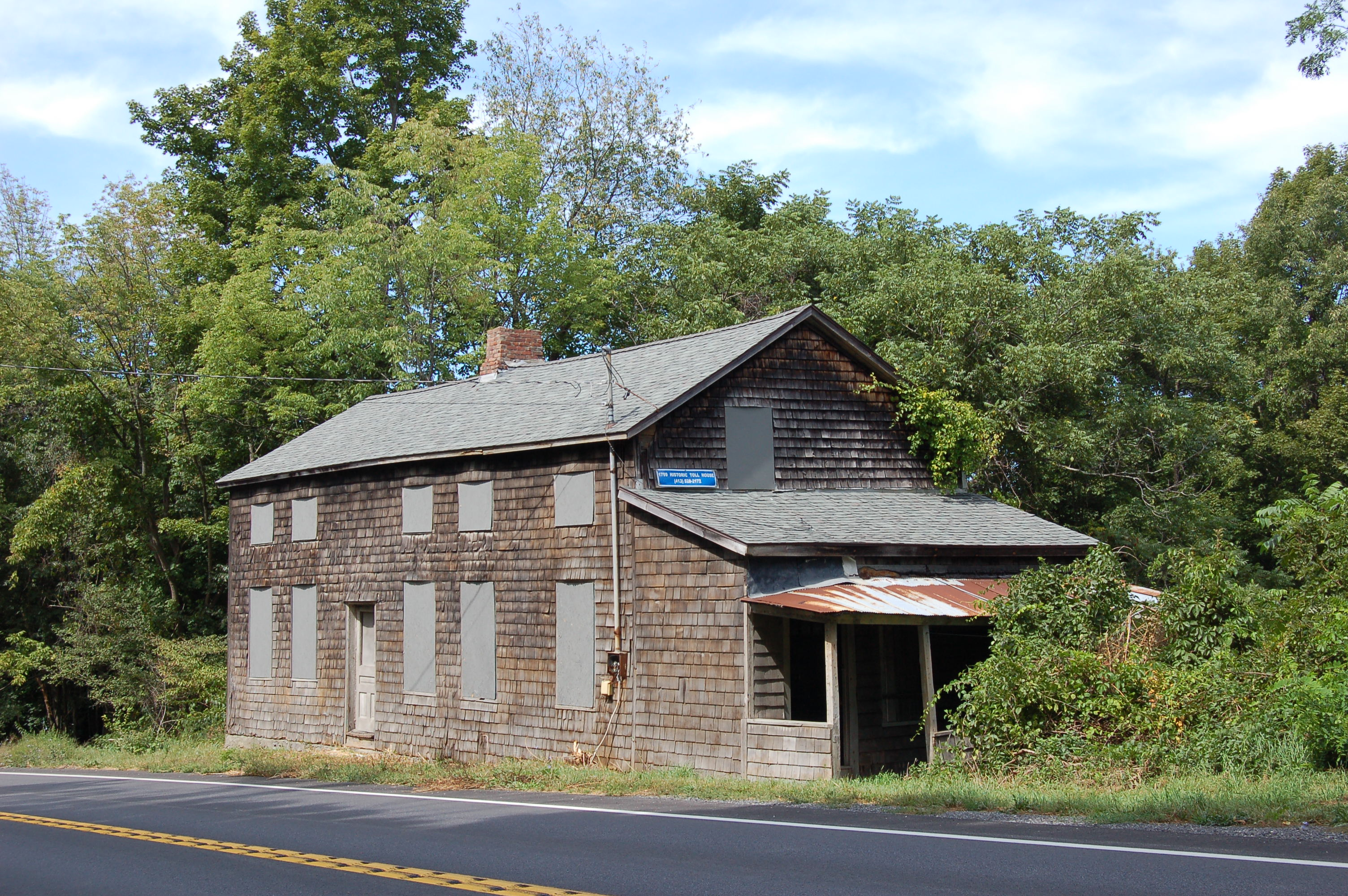
- The former toll house as seen on NY 23 in September 2016.

- Location within New York Location within the United States
- Location: NY 23, near Hillsdale, New York
- Area: less than one acre
- Built: 1799
- Architectural style: Federal
- NRHP reference No.: 16000411
- Added to NRHP: June 23, 2016

Columbia Turnpike-East Tollhouse (also known as the Hillsdale Toll House) is a 1799-built toll house along New York State Route 23 east of Mitchell Street and Mansfield Road in the Town of Hillsdale, New York. It operated along the Columbia Turnpike until 1907 when it was turned over to the county and then the state, which designated the road as New York State Route 23. The house served as a private residence until 1990.

It was added to the National Register of Historic Places on June 23, 2016.

== See also ==
- Columbia Turnpike-West Tollhouse
