= Linlithgo Reformed Church of Livingston =

Historic church in New York, United States

- U.S. National Register of Historic Places
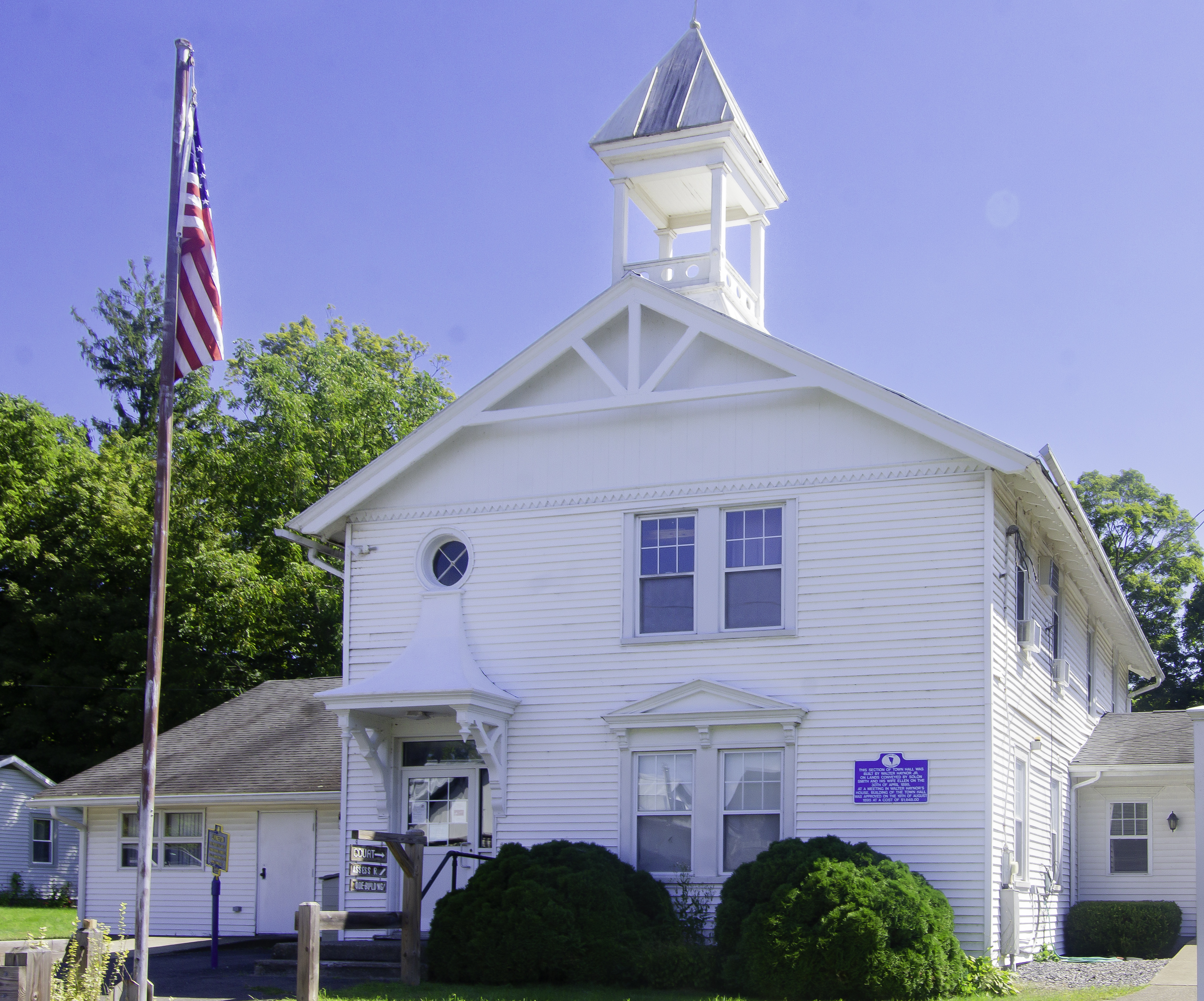

- Location within New York Location within the United States
- Location: 447 Church Rd., Livingston, New York
- Coordinates: 42°8′40″N 73°46′36″W
- Area: 5 acres (2.0 ha)
- Built: 1854
- Architectural style: Italianate
- NRHP reference No.: 05001614
- Added to NRHP: February 1, 2006

Linlithgo Reformed Church of Livingston is a historic Dutch Reformed church at 447 Church Road in Livingston, Columbia County, New York. It was built in 1854 and is a two-story brick building with a medium pitched gable roof, deep bracketed cornice, and semi-engaged tower in the center bay of the front facade in the Italianate style. The adjacent cemetery contains several hundred burials dating from about 1814 to the present.

It was listed on the National Register of Historic Places in 2006.
