= Hyphen (architecture) =

Architectural element

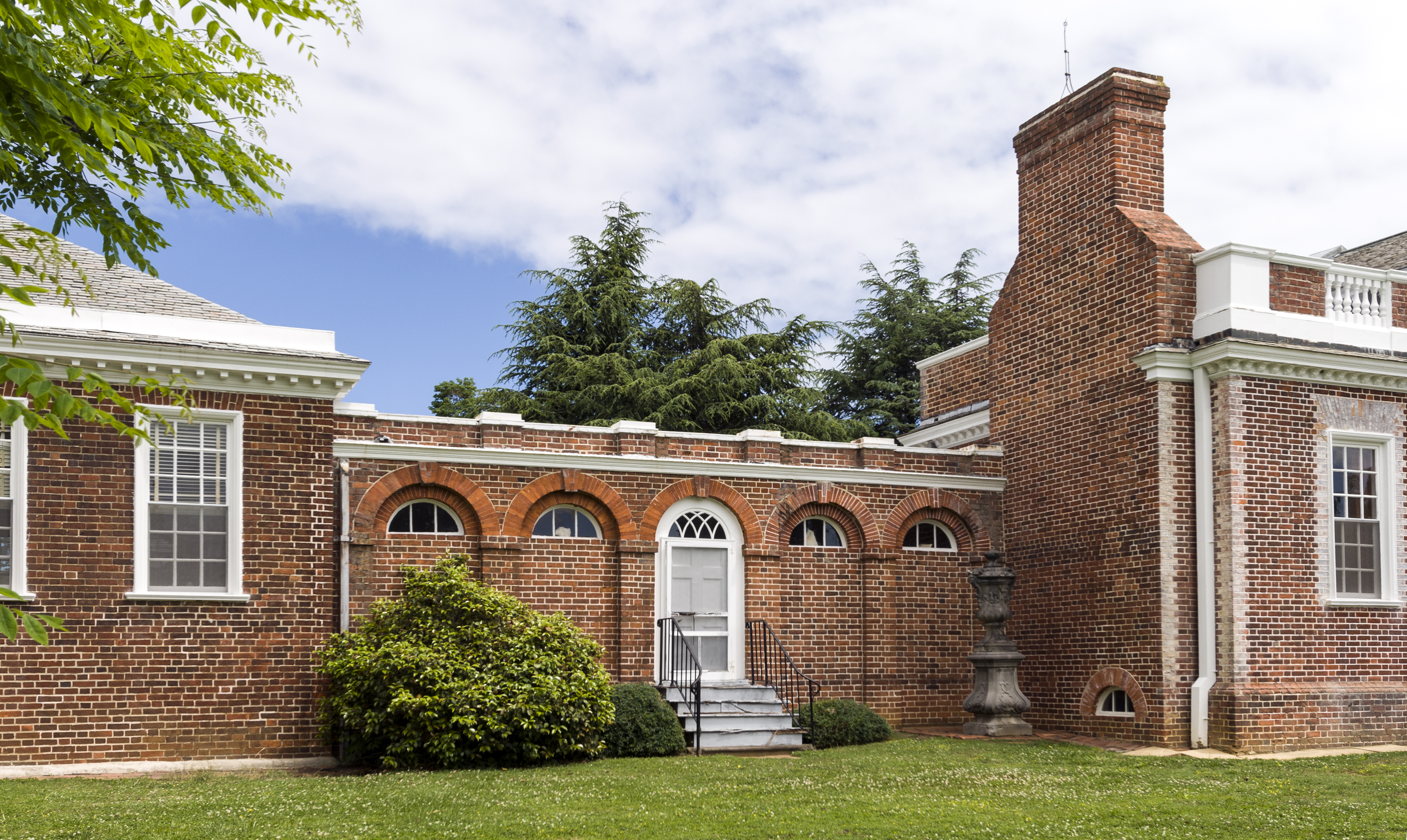
The hyphen connecting the main house (right) to the west end pavilion (left) at Whitehall (Annapolis, Maryland)

In architecture, a hyphen is a connecting link between two larger building elements. It is typically found in Palladian architecture, where the hyphens form connections between a large corps de logis and terminating pavilions.

== See also ==
- Ell (architecture)
