= Claverack-Red Mills, New York =

Claverack, New York
- Census-designated place
- Location within New York Location within the United States
- Coordinates: 42°13′31″N 73°43′17″W
- Country: United States
- State: New York
- County: Columbia
- Town: Claverack

Area
  - Total: 3.03 sq mi (7.85 km^{2})
  - Land: 3.01 sq mi (7.80 km^{2})
  - Water: 0.019 sq mi (0.05 km^{2})
- Elevation: 205 ft (62 m)

Population (2020)
  - Total: 953
  - Density: 316.3/sq mi (122.14/km^{2})
- Time zone: UTC-5 (Eastern (EST))
  - Summer (DST): UTC-4 (EDT)
- ZIP Codes: 12513 (Claverack); 12534 (Hudson)
- FIPS code: 36-16050

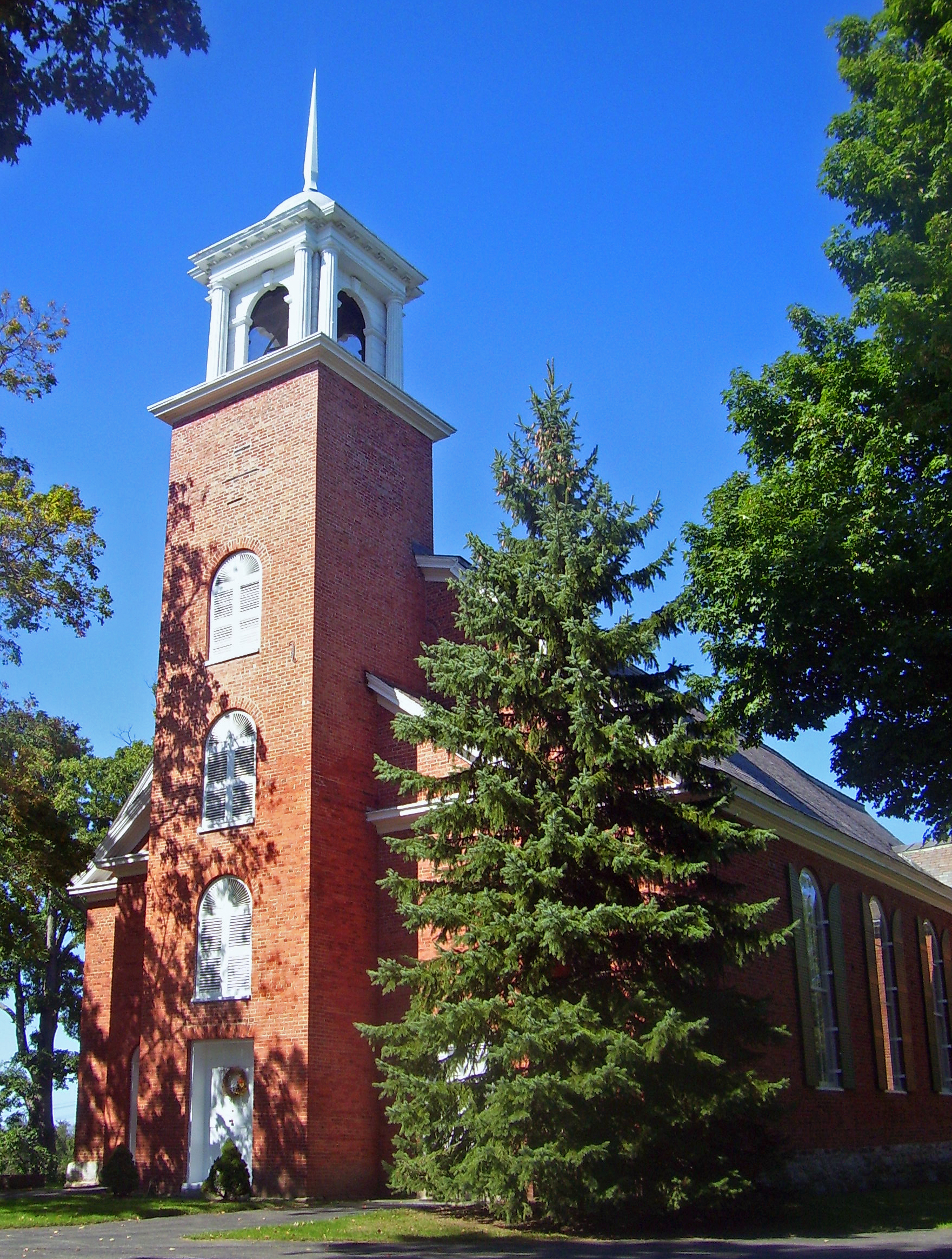
The Reformed Dutch Church of Claverack, New York, relevant to the census-designated place of Claverack-Red Mills

Claverack-Red Mills, commonly known as Claverack, is a census-designated place (CDP) in Columbia County, New York, United States. The population was 953 at the 2020 census.

The census region is in the western part of the town of Claverack and derives its name from the two hamlets of Claverack and Red Mills.

The community has a number of historic buildings, including the Harriet Phillips Bungalow. From 1779 to 1902, Claverack College operated in the village.

== Geography ==
Claverack-Red Mills is located in the western part of the town of Claverack at 42°13′31″N 73°43′17″W (42.225214, -73.721449). The center of Claverack hamlet is at the intersection of New York State Routes 9H, 23, and 23B. NY 23B leads northwest 4 miles (6 km) to downtown Hudson, NY 9H leads north 13 miles (21 km) to Kinderhook, and NY 23 leads east 12 miles (19 km) to Hillsdale and 15 miles (24 km) to the Massachusetts border. Routes 9H and 23 combined lead south 4 miles (6 km) to U.S. Route 9 in the town of Livingston. The center of Red Mills is along NY 23, 1 mile (1.6 km) east of Claverack hamlet. From Red Mills, NY 217 leads northeast 4 miles (6 km) to Philmont.

According to the United States Census Bureau, the CDP has a total area of 3.0 square miles (7.8 km^{2}), of which 0.02 square miles (0.05 km^{2}), or 0.60%, is water. Claverack Creek, a tributary of the Hudson River, flows westward as the southern edge of the CDP, south of the centers of the two hamlets.

== Demographics ==
Historical population
Census	Pop.	Note	%±
2000	1,061		—
2010	913		−13.9%
2020	953		4.4%
U.S. Decennial Census

As of the census of 2000, there were 1,061 people, 470 households, and 308 families residing in the CDP. The population density was 362.0 inhabitants per square mile (139.8/km^{2}). There were 510 housing units at an average density of 174.0 per square mile (67.2/km^{2}). The racial makeup of the CDP was 97.74% White, 0.75% African American, 0.09% Native American, 0.38% from other races, and 1.04% from two or more races. Hispanic or Latino of any race were 0.94% of the population.

There were 470 households, out of which 24.3% had children under the age of 18 living with them, 54.3% were married couples living together, 9.1% had a female householder with no husband present, and 34.3% were non-families. 30.0% of all households were made up of individuals, and 14.9% had someone living alone who was 65 years of age or older. The average household size was 2.26 and the average family size was 2.79.

In the CDP, the population was spread out, with 18.9% under the age of 18, 4.9% from 18 to 24, 23.3% from 25 to 44, 29.5% from 45 to 64, and 23.5% who were 65 years of age or older. The median age was 47 years. For every 100 females, there were 98.7 males. For every 100 females age 18 and over, there were 92.6 males.

The median income for a household in the CDP was $49,476, and the median income for a family was $60,677. Males had a median income of $41,591 versus $32,222 for females. The per capita income for the CDP was $30,237. None of the families and 3.1% of the population were living below the poverty line, including no under eighteens and 7.1% of those over 64.
