= History of the Connecticut Constitution =

Connecticut is known as "The Constitution State". The origin of this title is uncertain, but the nickname is assumed to be a reference to the Fundamental Orders of 1638–39 which represent the framework for the first formal government written by a representative body in Connecticut. Connecticut's government has operated under the direction of five separate documents in its history. The Connecticut Colony at Hartford was governed by the Fundamental Orders, and the Quinnipiac Colony at New Haven had its own Constitution in The Fundamental Agreement of the New Haven Colony which was signed on 4 June 1639.

In 1662, King Charles II of England granted governmental authority and a royal charter to the Connecticut colonies. These two documents laid the groundwork for the state's government but lacked characteristics of what is generally thought of as a constitution. Separate branches of government did not exist during this period, and the General Assembly acted as the supreme authority. The current state constitution was implemented in 1965; it absorbed the majority of its 1818 predecessor and incorporated a handful of important modifications.

== Connecticut's foundation as a religious colony ==
The Fundamental Orders of Connecticut were adopted on 14 January 1639, and the document has been referred to as the world's first written constitution. At the urging of influential preacher Thomas Hooker, the Connecticut legislative body (or General Court) began secret committee meetings to discuss drafting the orders in June 1638. The Council completed its efforts by the beginning of 1639, and the Fundamental Orders became the cornerstone of government in Connecticut soon after.

Connecticut was founded by Puritans from the Massachusetts Bay Colony between 1635 and 1636. The first settlers founded three towns on the Connecticut River in Windsor, Wethersfield, and Hartford, Connecticut, and one of the main purposes of the Fundamental Orders was to formalize the relationship among these settlements. The foundation of the Fundamental Orders incorporated the religious background of the colony's founders. They called for "an orderly and decent government according to God" in attempts to pursue "the liberty and purity of the gospel of our Lord Jesus" and stipulated that "the Governor be always a member of some approved congregation".

New Haven Colony was separate at the time, and their Fundamental Agreement (1639) states that "church members only shall be free burgesses". Voting rights were further limited under the Fundamental Orders. All males at least 21 years of age could become freemen (voters) if they met certain property qualifications. In order to vote, the citizen must own real estate assessed at a yearly rental value of 40 shillings or own taxable property assessed at 40 pounds sterling.

== Separation of powers from 1639 to 1818 ==
The governance of Connecticut developed over the roughly 180 years from the ideas presented by Rev. Thomas Hooker in 1638 to the Constitution of 1818. Connecticut's government had separation of powers as defined by the original Fundamental Orders of 1639, but with a strong single assembly. However, the colony elected its own governor and appointed its own judges, rather than having a royally appointed governor. It changed over the next 50 years into a bicameral legislature with a strong governor and a more independent judiciary.

The legislative body was the General Court, which began as a one-house legislature that wielded supreme authority. The General Court split in 1698 and was renamed the General Assembly, although it continued to enjoy dominance over the executive and judiciary until 1818. After the 1698 split, the General Assembly consisted of the houses of the Council and the Assembly. The council was the more powerful of the two houses, consisting of the governor and lieutenant governor ex officio and 12 elected assistants. The 12 assistants were not elected from particular jurisdictions, but represented the state as a whole. The Assembly varied in number up to 200 members, with each town sending one or two representatives.

Initially, the position of governor was somewhat symbolic. The executive had no power of pardon and no ability to veto bills passed by the General Assembly. Under the Fundamental Orders, the maximum term for the governor was two years, and he could not succeed himself. For many years, John Haynes and Edward Hopkins took turns with the position, each serving a two-year term and then rotating back to the role of lieutenant governor. The primary responsibilities of the governor were as an official statesman and a member of the legislature. Before the split into two houses, the governor acted as the moderator of the General Court. Afterwards, he held the spot on the council.

In 1667, King James II sent Sir Edmund Andros to take control as governor of the Dominion of New England, provoking the famous Charter Oak incident, and the office of governor was made stronger as a result. There were only nine Connecticut governors with an average of 10 years in office from the time of Robert Treat in 1689 to Jonathan Trumbull in 1776. Connecticut became known as "the land of steady habits" for re-electing the same men over and over. Various wars also strengthened the position of the governor, who organized the militia. The governorship was an extremely important role during the American Revolutionary War due to its responsibility as commander-in-chief of the state militia.

Perhaps the least influential branch of government under the Fundamental Orders was the judiciary. Until 1818, the legislative branch was the court of final resort in the state, holding appellate jurisdiction over all lower courts. If a litigant was dissatisfied with the court's decision, he simply had to go to the legislature to request a review. This often led to circumstances where a representative or assistant sat in review of a case in which he was personally interested as an attorney, litigant, or friend of one of the parties. When it became too burdensome for the entire assembly to handle appeals, the Supreme Court of Errors was created in 1784. Instead of being composed of the entire assembly, only the members of the Council sat as the Supreme Court of Errors. This change failed to alleviate many of the conflict of interest problems inherent in the appellate process.

Under political pressure, the General Assembly changed the makeup of the Supreme Court of Errors in 1806. Members of the Council no longer sat on the court; instead, the nine Superior Court judges acted as the Supreme Court of Errors when all of them sat together. This created a judicial body, but the General Assembly still retained the power to reverse decisions of the court. It also resulted in the constant situation of a Superior Court judge sitting in review of a case over which he had presided at the trial level.

A notorious instance of legislative interference with the courts occurred in 1815, when Peter Lung was convicted of murder and sentenced to death. Lung filed a petition with the General Assembly, and they overturned his conviction. The court retried him, convicted him again—and promptly executed him. Lung's Case outraged all Connecticut judges, most notably Chief Justice Zephaniah Swift, who spoke out for judicial independence in a pamphlet the following year. Establishment of an independent judiciary became one of the central rallying cries in support of a new constitution.

== The Connecticut Charter of 1662 ==
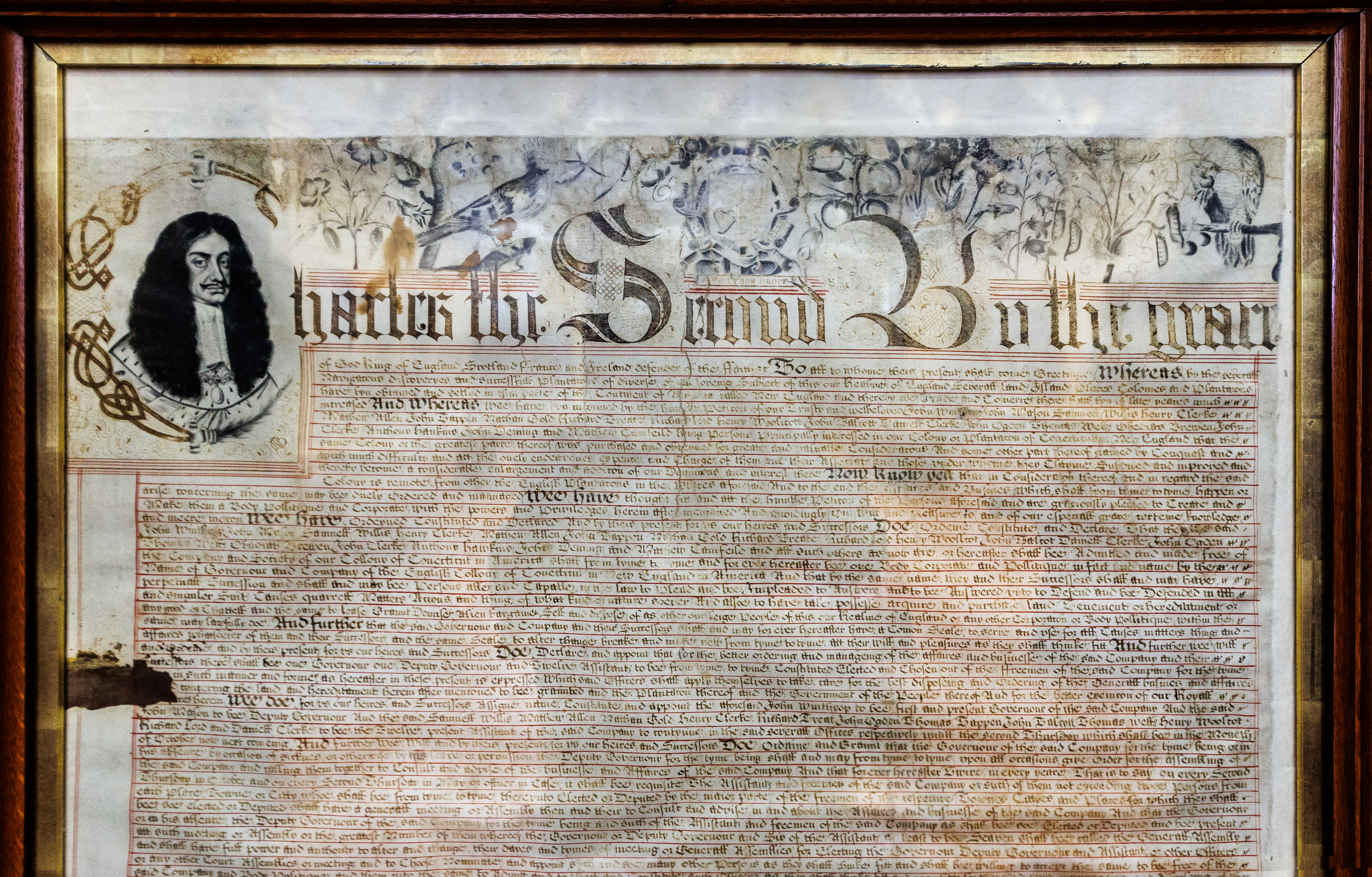
Connecticut's royal charter

Connecticut's claims according to the 1662 charter

The English Parliament restored the monarchy in 1660, and King Charles II assumed the English throne. Connecticut had never been officially recognized as a colony by the English government, so the General Court determined that the independence of Connecticut must be legitimized. Governor John Winthrop Jr. was sent as an emissary to negotiate with the English government, and set sail for England on 23 July 1661. He proved successful in his mission, and the English attorney general approved a bill for incorporation of the Connecticut Charter. The document was returned to Connecticut after being officially sealed and registered, and was adopted by the General Court on 9 October 1662.

The Connecticut Charter displaced the Fundamental Orders and became the governing authority for the colony. Its practical effect was minimal on the government, however, and Connecticut continued to operate much as it had under the Fundamental Orders. The Charter did incorporate a few noteworthy changes. All colonists in Connecticut were given "all liberties and immunities" of the realm of England. The governor was granted the additional authority to convene a session of the General Court, while freemen were stripped of this ability. The colony's borders were to be Narragansett Bay on the east and Massachusetts on the north, while its southwestern boundary was expanded to the "South Sea on the West", meaning the Pacific Ocean. Connecticut's borders never approached this limitation, but the Charter did place the separate New Haven Colony within its jurisdiction. Several judges who had sentenced Charles I to death had subsequently been given refuge in New Haven, and Charles II may have been exacting revenge. After a brief dispute, New Haven decided to voluntarily join Connecticut in 1665. Today the city of New Haven still maintains Three Judges Cave on West Rock as a tribute to the judges who hid from Charles II's agents.

== The Charter Oak ==
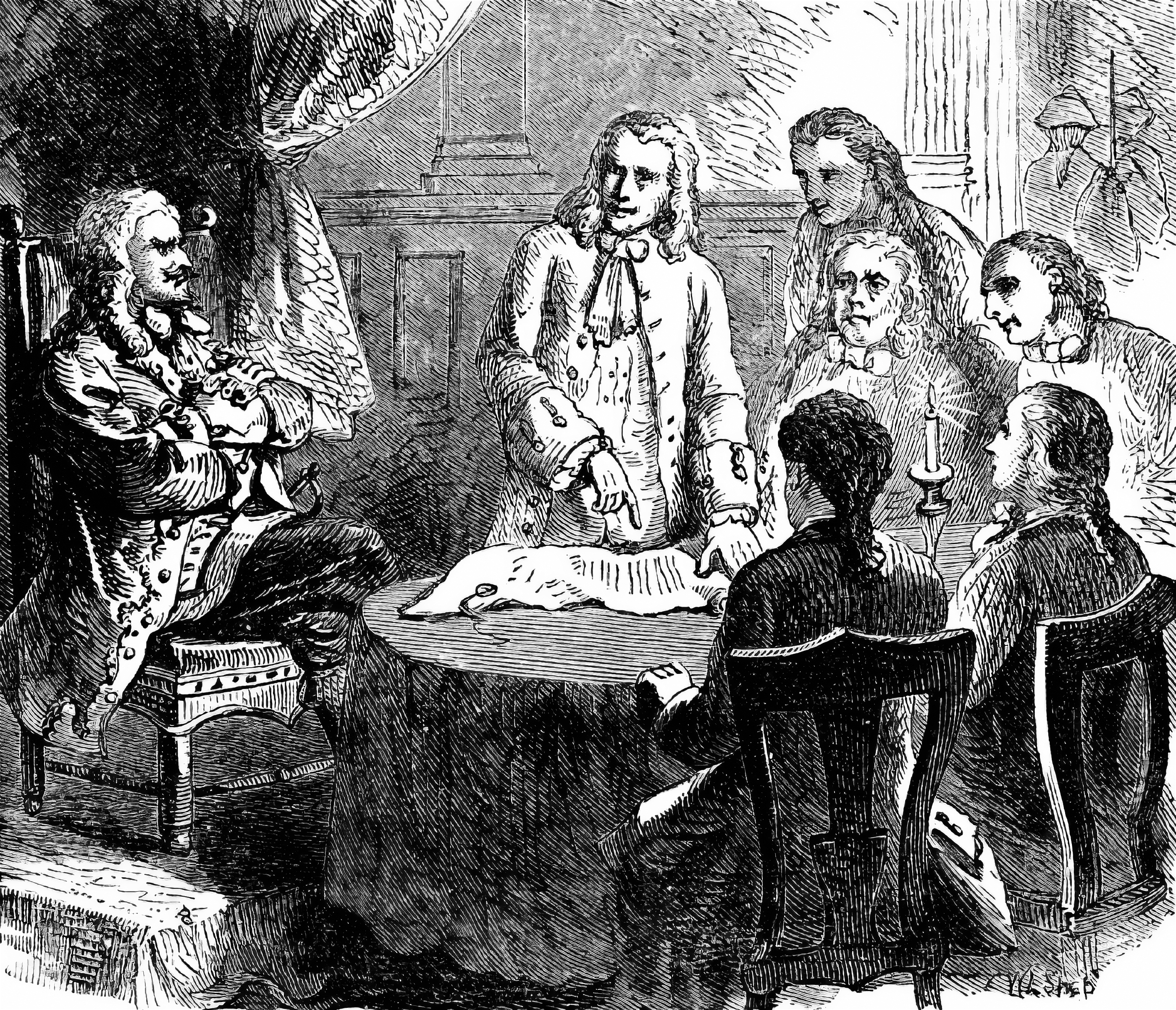
Andros in Connecticut

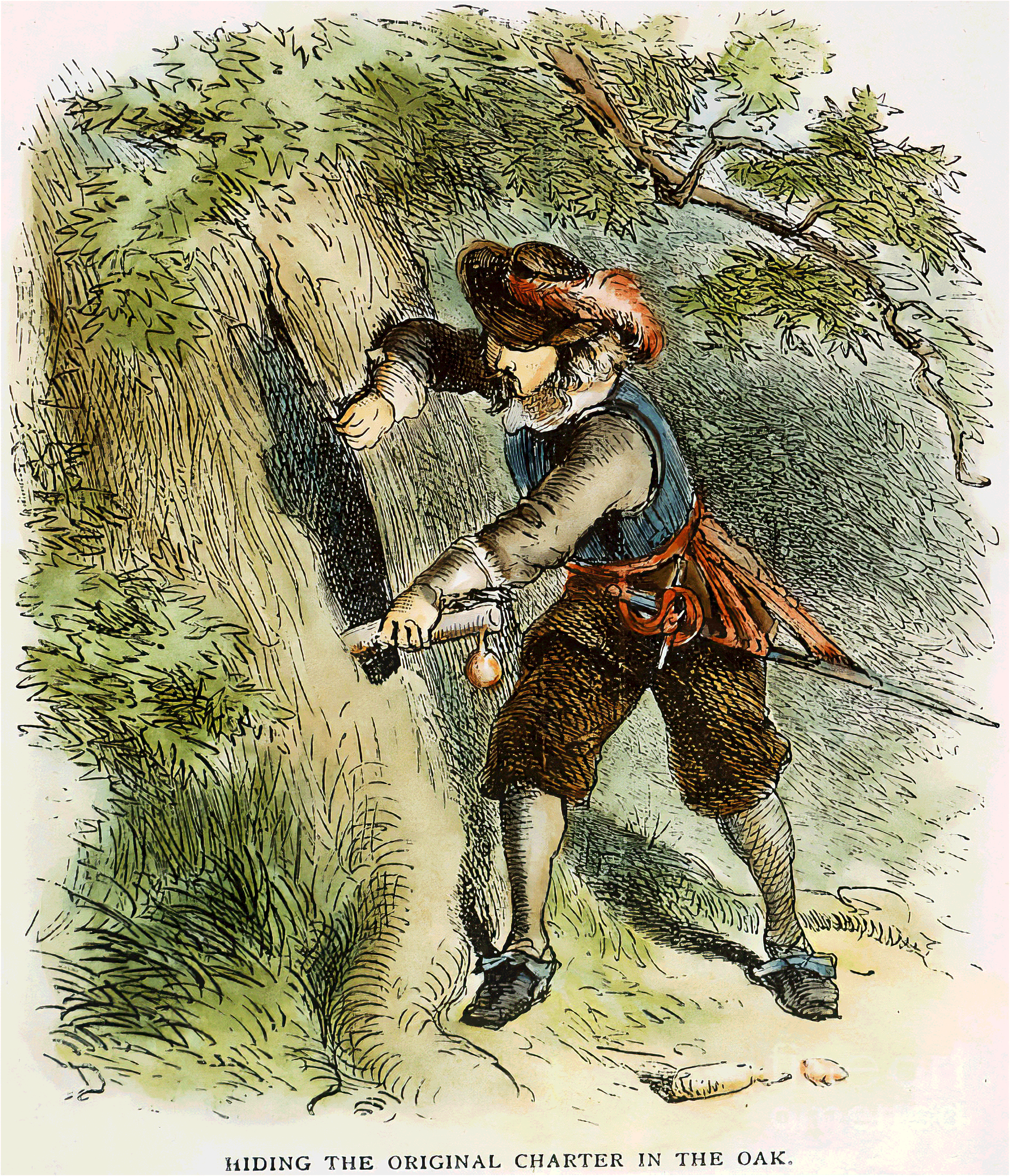
Hiding the charter in the oak

Two years after the Connecticut Charter was granted, Charles II granted his brother, James-Duke of York, a Patent for a New York Colony. It extended from the Delaware River to the Connecticut River, thus creating a conflict with the Connecticut Charter. Edmund Andros was appointed the third governor of the English Colony of New York in 1674. Andros sailed to Connecticut in 1675 demanding that all undeeded land west of the Connecticut river be relinquished to James. Captain Bull, of the Connecticut Militia, refused his entry into the Colony. Andros returned to New York. Ten years later, James ascended the Throne with the death of his childless brother Charles II. James II created a new colony by combining seven colonies into the Dominion of New England. The Dominion included all the Atlantic Colonies from New Jersey to New Hampshire. Sir Edmund Andros was appointed Governor. In 1686, he demanded that the seven colonies surrender their charters; all were null and void. Connecticut ignored the initial request. Andros served a writ on the governor, again demanding the surrender of the charter; he finally went to Hartford with a band of soldiers on 31 October 1687.

The historical accuracy of what followed is somewhat uncertain, but the commonly accepted version is that Andros met with the leaders of the colony one night at the meetinghouse, expecting them to relinquish the charter. They had it lying on a table, but they suddenly blew out the candles and threw the room into darkness; when the lights were reignited, it had vanished. Joseph Wadsworth fled with the document and hid it in an oak tree on the Wyllys estate, and this tree became known as the Charter Oak, a famous landmark in Connecticut. The precise details of this account have never been confirmed, but it is certain that Andros never got his hands on the charter.

Despite this accomplishment, Andros briefly succeeded in forcing Connecticut to succumb to his rule, and the General Court of Connecticut declared itself dissolved, but Andros's reign ended after The Glorious Revolution took place in England in November 1688. He was deposed from power shortly after.

Connecticut was left with several options on how to restart its government. Some advocated direct ties to the crown with a royal government, while others lobbied for drafting a completely new charter, but Connecticut finally opted to return to the status quo. The government under the Charter was reinstated, including the reinstatement of all leaders previously in place before the interruption. In May 1689, the General Court issued a declaration that "all the laws of this colony formerly made, according to the Charter, and Courts constituted in this colony for administration of justice as they were before the late interruption, shall be of full force and virtue for the future." After reaching this conclusion, the colony petitioned the monarchy for approval of their return to operation under the charter. In the meantime, New York Governor Benjamin Fletcher attempted to claim military authority over Connecticut. John Winthrop's son Fitz John went as the emissary to England as his father had done more than 30 years earlier in 1661, and he was successful in his mission. The Attorney General and Solicitor General reported to the king that the charter remained valid, and the king ratified it on 19 April 1694. This represented the end of serious challenges to Connecticut's autonomy.

== Connecticut governance after the Revolution ==
The General Assembly formally approved the Declaration of Independence with the other colonies, especially since its own Roger Sherman had helped to draft it. The legislature declared in its resolution that Connecticut's government "shall continue to be as established by Charter received from Charles the second, King of England, so far as an adherence to the same will be consistent with an absolute independence of this State on the Crown of Great Britain". Even in independence, Connecticut wished to remain governed in accordance with King Charles' Charter. Eleven of the Thirteen Colonies had drafted state constitutions by 1786, but Connecticut elected to continue operation under the Charter. Connecticut forged ahead under this scheme of government until 1818, when a formal state constitution was adopted.

== The Constitution of 1818 ==
In 1816, Connecticut was entirely in the control of the Federalist Party and the established Congregationalist Church. Connecticut was known as "the land of steady habits" for its custom of re-electing those in power until they died; the Democratic-Republican party had been organized in 1804, yet Connecticut remained one of the last holdouts of the Federalist party in America. Once Massachusetts passed the 1811 Religious Freedom Act, Connecticut was last state to effectively have an established state religion in practice and not just on paper; it also had the only Constitution going back to the days of the British Empire. In 1815, Episcopalians, Baptists, Methodists, and members of other dissident denominations to the established Congregationalist church combined with the Democratic-Republican party to form the Toleration Party. In 1816, they held a convention and ran a slate of candidates. In 1817, they took control of the state Assembly (lower house), and elected Oliver Wolcott Jr. as Governor and Jonathan Ingersoll as Lieutenant-governor.

In 1639, a year after the founding of the state, the Rev. Thomas Hooker had given a sermon that formed the basis of Fundamental Orders of Connecticut, the first state Constitution. Since then, an "Anniversary Election Sermon" was given at the Center Church in Hartford to celebrate the fusion of church and state. A procession of militia, assemblymen, and clerics from all over the state would move through Hartford; then a prominent cleric would preach a political sermon to the assembly. One measure of the event's importance is the attention given to the sometimes long-winded sermons; President Ezra Stiles of Yale preached one in 1783 that lasted five hours and was 99 pages when printed.

Governor Wolcott knew that the Toleration Party would soon have the votes to take a slim majority in the upper house, after the spring elections of 1818. He asked Episcopalian Rev. Harry Croswell to give the politically important Anniversary Election Sermon the next year. Croswell was a former Federalist crusading journalist who had been sued for seditious libel by the Jefferson-party in New York in the famous People v. Croswell case. He had entirely abandoned politics for religion; he was now the Rector of the large and influential Trinity Church on the Green in New Haven. But he did not give the expected triumphant political sermon, or yet another standard election sermon of the sort that had been delivered since almost the founding of Connecticut in 1638. Instead, he gave an Election sermon in the spring of 1818 that strongly insisted on the total separation of church and state. Croswell's sermon had strong and immediate impact. It was ordered printed in an unprecedented four editions around the state. Croswell had been a newspaper editor during a time when paper was scarce and space was tight; his sermon was only 11 pages when printed, or about 30 minutes long when preached.

The General Assembly met just after the unusually short Anniversary Election Sermon was delivered and made a significant change to voting rights in Connecticut. All white males who paid taxes or served in the militia were deemed eligible to vote. This eliminated the previous property requirements that had grown onerous, as more of the population moved to jobs in commerce or manufacturing rather than agriculture.

Even more significantly, the General Assembly also called for a constitutional convention that year. The most important ballot cast in the General Assembly was the vote on whether only a simple majority of the legislature would be required to approve whatever constitution was ultimately drafted. Many favored requiring anywhere from a sixty to eighty percent majority for adoption of a new government.

It seems that Croswell's well-received and short sermon was efficacious; those in favor of a simple majority carried the vote by 81–80. Thus a single-vote margin passed the resolution vital to the future success of the constitution that disestablished the state church and separated church and state.

Each town sent a number of delegates equal to the number of representatives held in the Assembly. The convention convened in Hartford on 26 August 1818. As one of the first orders of business, a twenty-four man committee was appointed to prepare a draft constitution. The very next day, the committee returned with the Preamble and Bill of Rights. Their speed was not due to ingenuity. The draft was borrowed "almost verbatim" from the constitution that Mississippi had created a year earlier in 1817. After the remainder of the constitution was drafted, the convention approved the document by a two-to-one margin on 16 September 1818. The voters were given three weeks to consider the proposed constitution. A vote was held on October 5. A small majority cast their ballots in favor of the constitution, with the resolution passing 13,918 to 12,364. The ultimate vote proved the importance of requiring only a simple majority's approval, for a sixty or eighty percent requirement would not have been met.

As a result of the new constitution, the Congregational Church was finally disestablished, although Christianity remained the constitutionally favored religion. Newly received voting rights were also solidified, as the convention provided constitutional rights to vote for all white males who paid taxes or had served in the militia. With the 1818 Constitution, separation of powers was finally brought to Connecticut government. The word "white" was also codified as a voting requirement. An independent judiciary was approved. Both Supreme and Superior Court judges were now given life tenure to the age of seventy (this was changed to eight years in 1856). The Supreme Court of Errors was reduced to five judges, with each judge retaining a role as a Superior Court judge. Decisions of the court could no longer be appealed to the legislature.

The constitution did not significantly change the role of the executive, and the branch remained relatively weak. The executive did become a constitutional and independent part of the government, however. The governor was no longer granted a seat in the legislature. He was granted the new power of veto, but any of his vetoes could be overruled by a simple majority vote from the Assembly. This made the veto power essentially useless since any bill would have to pass both houses by a majority anyway. The General Assembly retained the authority to nominate judges under the new constitution. This was not changed until 1880, when nomination powers were transferred to the governor.

The legislative branch also experienced a few changes. The council was renamed the Senate. By constitutional mandate, half the legislative sessions were to take place in Hartford with the other half convening in New Haven. Surprisingly, the method in which towns were assigned a number of representatives was left unchanged. Each town predating the constitution retained two representatives in the lower house regardless of population, with the exception of several newer towns which were granted one vote.

A state constitutional convention was held in Hartford in 1902 for reapportionment, but the proposed constitution was rejected by voters. Many amendments were added over the years, but the Constitution of 1818 remained in operation until 1965. There was also a Constitution of 1955, but it merely incorporated prior amendments into the main body of the constitution.

== Constitution of 1965 ==
Connecticut currently operates under the constitution passed in 1965. The primary purpose of the 1965 constitutional convention was reapportionment of the representatives in the lower legislative house. Assigning each town one or two representatives had resulted in grossly disproportional representation. Small rural towns enjoyed equal representation with large urban communities. Apart from this major change, a majority of the language from the 1818 Constitution was reaffirmed verbatim or almost verbatim in 1965. Non-Christians were finally granted official freedom of religion in 1965, although a law had been passed by the legislature in 1843 which recognized Jews' right to worship, though these laws were largely ignored following large-scale Jewish and Catholic immigration in the last half of the 19th century. The reference to Christianity from the earlier constitution was deleted. After 1965, the Supreme Court of Errors' title was changed to the Connecticut Supreme Court. The executive obtained a significant power under the new constitution. The governor still does not enjoy the privilege of pardon, but the office was granted a more significant power of veto under the latest constitution. Instead of being able to be overridden by a second majority vote, the legislature now must muster two-thirds support in both houses to defeat a veto. Also of note, the 1965 Constitution includes a constitutional right to free public education. In addition, the most recent constitution has provided a mechanism to convene future constitutional conventions if necessary.

The Constitution of 1965 remains the supreme authority in Connecticut today. It represents the fourth distinct document in state history laying out the mechanics for its form of government. Connecticut is known as the Constitution State because of its early adoption of the Fundamental Orders in 1639, thought to be the earliest document of its kind in western civilization. Since that time Connecticut has undergone several constitutional crises and alterations, which have led the state to its present state of affairs today.
