= World Cocktail Day =

International observance

World Cocktail Day is a global celebration of cocktails; it marks the publication date of the first definition of a cocktail on May 13, 1806.

The New York tabloid The Balance and Columbian Repository defined a cocktail as "a stimulating liquor, composed of spirits of any kind, sugar, water and bitters". It was written by editor Harry Croswell in response to a reader's inquiry.
