= Trinity Church on the Green =

Historic church in Connecticut, United States

- U.S. National Historic Landmark District – Contributing property
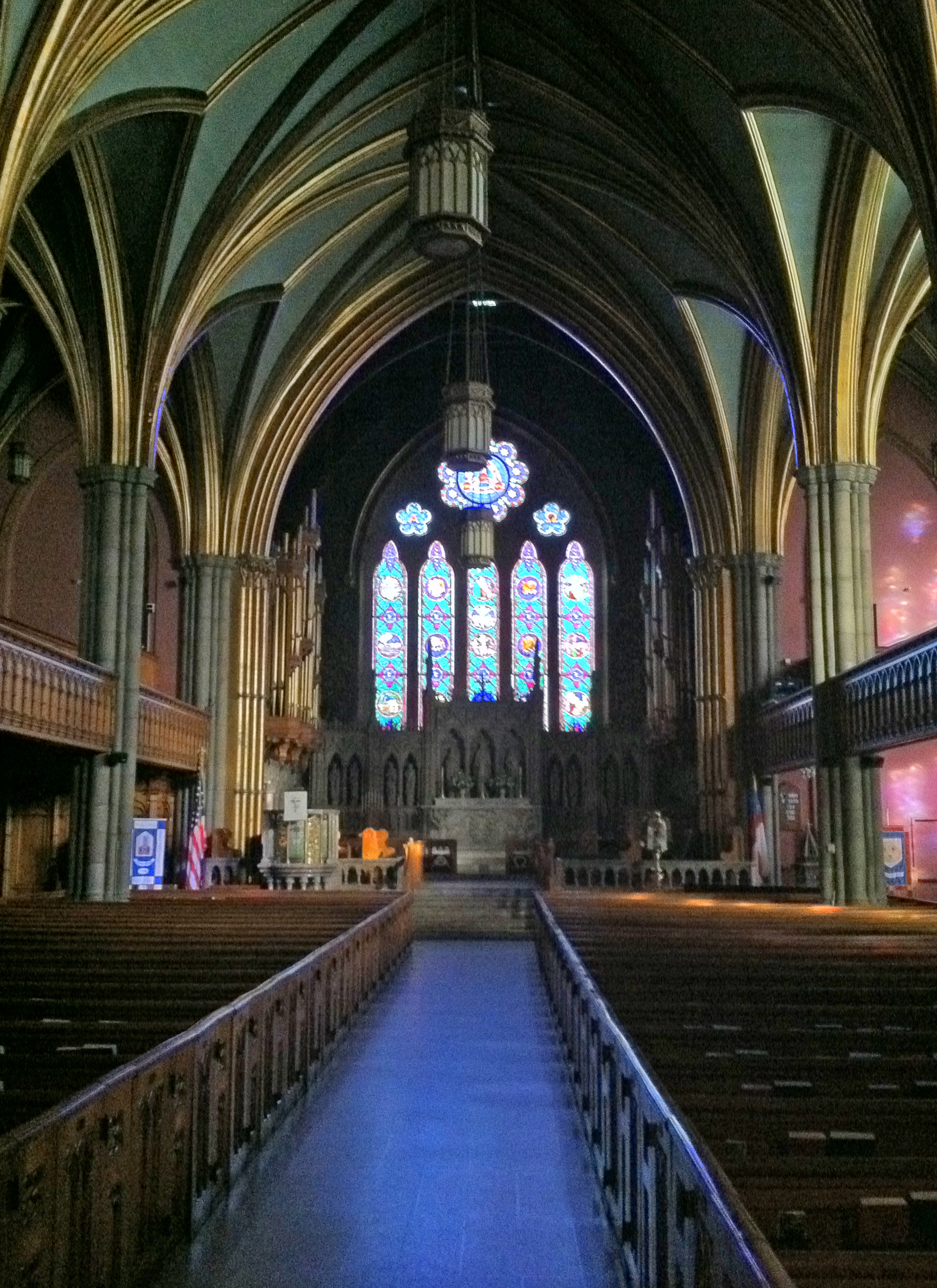

- Location within Connecticut Location within the United States
- Location: 230 Temple Street, New Haven, Connecticut
- Built: 1814-1816
- Architect: Ithiel Town
- Architectural style: Gothic Revival
- Part of: New Haven Green Historic District (ID70000838)
- Added to NRHP: December 30, 1970

Trinity Church on the Green or Trinity on the Green is a parish of the Episcopal Diocese of Connecticut in New Haven, Connecticut, United States. It is one of three historic churches on the New Haven Green. The church reported 831 members in 2020 and 426 members in 2025. Plate and pledge income reported for the congregation in 2025 was $531,932. Average Sunday attendance (ASA) in 2025 was 219 persons, down from a reported 535 in 2019.

This landmark building was designed by Ithiel Town in 1813, built between 1814 and 1815, and consecrated in 1816. It was built in what contemporaries such as the Rev. Samuel Jarvis labeled as the "Gothick style". It is the first example of a thoroughly Gothic style derived church building in North America, and predates the Gothic Revival architectural style in England by more than two decades.

It is notable for its historic architecture. It largely retains its original early Gothic exterior, using the indigenous New Haven trap rock, in this form, a red/brown/orange stone that changes color with light and moisture for its external walls. Its mostly newer Gothicizing interior has burgundy walls and deep-sea green ceilings, oak pews with closing doors leading into the aisle, and gilt arches, groining, and organ pipes. It has eight stained glass windows on the north and south sides, including four Tiffany stained glass windows, and a rare "nonafoil" or nonagon shaped nine-petal Trinity Rose Window on the chancel end of the church (to the west), added when the chancel was added in 1884. The west end (liturgical east) wall of the chancel also contains two pentafoils alpha/omega windows, and five narrow windows with medallions giving the history of creation, along with icons of the four gospels and other religious symbols. Most unusual is the east side outfacing window "Trinity's History and Vision," commissioned for the 250th anniversary of the first church and designed by glass artist Val Sigsted; it is back-lit at night and it shines out on the dark New Haven green for those passing by or waiting for the bus. The stone reredos in the chancel was dedicated in 1912, with statues carved by Lee Lawrie in both late Gothic Revival and very early Art Deco styles. There is also an historically sensitive architect-designed columbarium in the nave, completed in 2009, with a small altar used in healing services.

Trinity, along with its two neighboring churches on the Green, is part of the New Haven Green Historic District, that was designated a National Historic Landmark District on December 30, 1970.

Calling itself a "historic church in the heart of a city", Trinity is also known for its music. Its music program includes the Choir of Men and Boys, first formed in 1885, that has performed at the White House and toured England and the Continent, the more recently formed Choir of Adults and Girls, and an adult parish choir, all accompanied by a large Aeolian-Skinner organ. Its Trinity Players dramatic group performs original sermon dramas during services, and plays at other events.

Trinity Parish also sponsors the Chapel on the Green, a highly-accessible "outdoor church" that offers services and also lunch for the homeless every Sunday afternoon of the year regardless of weather. Its drumming circle, heard for blocks each Sunday, is its call to worship. Nearly a quarter of the parish income is spent is spent on local community outreach programs.

A cultural center, Trinity on the Green is often a venue for concerts, dramatic performances, and events by Yale University, Hopkins School, and the International Festival of Arts and Ideas.

== History ==
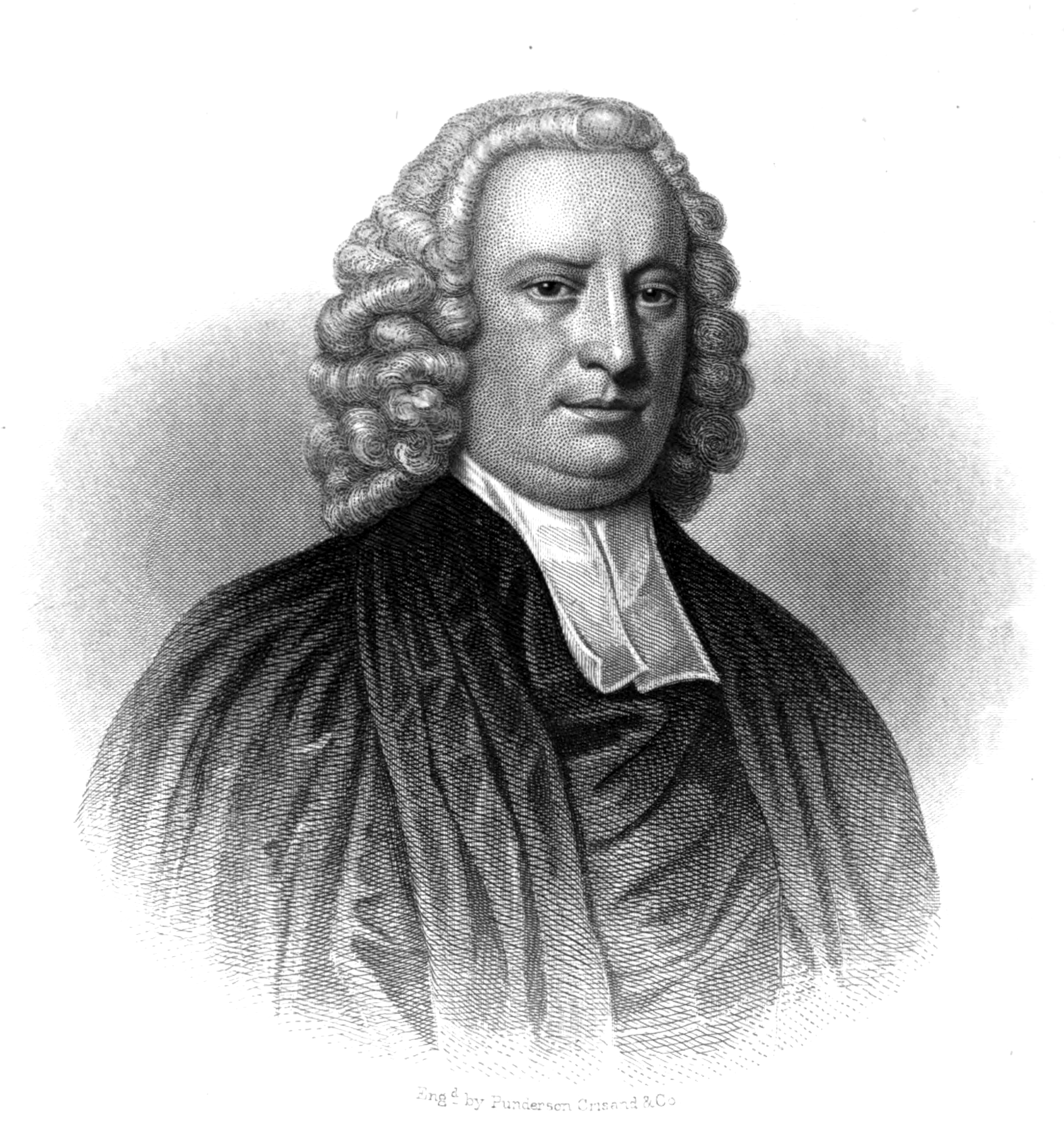
The Rev. Samuel Johnson

Officially known as "Trinity Episcopal Church on the Green, New Haven, Connecticut", the parish was organized in November of 1723 by the Rev. Dr. Samuel Johnson, a recent Anglican convert and a missionary priest of the Society for the Propagation of the Gospel in Foreign Parts - an organization now known as the United Society - immediately on his return from his ordination voyage to England. In January the next year he began baptizing parishioners in the parish. The parish was supplied by Johnson and a succession of missionary "priests in charge" until the Revolutionary War cut off funding from England and the parish became a self-funded church with a Rector around 1780.

Connecticut had been an established Congregationalist church colony since its founding in 1638, with only a single Anglican parish (and no church) in the village of Stratford, Connecticut, that had been only recently founded in 1707. Johnson on assuming his mission there in 1723 planned on using New Haven as a base to convert Yale students to the Episcopacy so they in turn could take orders and fill the newly founded parishes of his missionary territory in Connecticut. He was amazingly successful: Trinity Church would be the last of 25 churches he personally founded and saw built before he moved to New York City to found Columbia University: his disciples would build18 more churches in Connecticut by 1772. Johnson traveled to New Haven frequently between 1723 and 1752. During this time, services were conducted in private homes. Henry Caner, an English emigrant and the architect of the first 1718 Yale Hall, and his son Henry Caner Jr., were among the first members of Johnson's New Haven Anglican house church. Henry Caner Jr. later went on to study with Johnson, take orders, and lead Anglican churches in Fairfield, Connecticut, and King's Chapel, Boston.

=== First Wood Trinity Church 1752-1753 ===
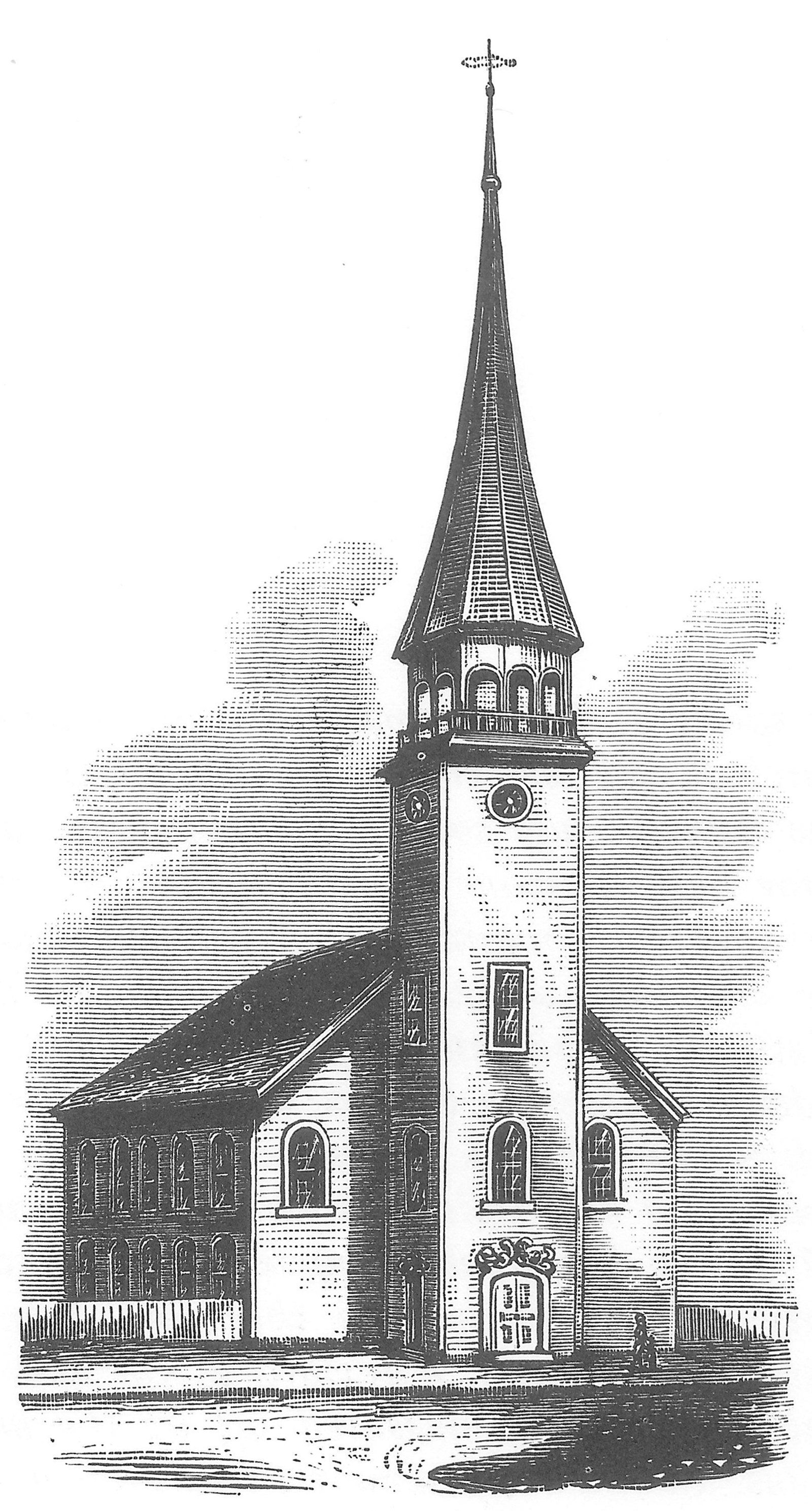
First Wooden Trinity Church 1752-3

In April 1728, the Rev. Samuel Johnson preached in New Haven: ten parishioners came up after the service and each subscribed £100 towards building a Church, though opposition by the town prevented its construction at that time, and for the next two decades. Undeterred by repeated failures, Johnson appointed two wardens around 1749, and collected money and timber to build a physical church for the parish. A hard-won deed to build a church in New Haven after opposition by New Haven Puritans was finally granted in 1752, and a wooden church was constructed in 1752-1753. Obtaining the deed, which took the parish nearly 30 years to obtain, was of such import and searing memory, that the date of the founding of the church for many years was dated from the day they formally obtained it as documented in city records. The second building, formed of trap rock, was built in 1814-1816 and still houses the parish today.

Trinity's First Church was built between July 1752 and the summer of 1753. It was located on the south side of Chapel Street and on the east side of what is today still called Church Street — named so after the church — about 100 feet from the corner. It was considered the first church in the town, as the three established Congregational places of worship in New Haven each called their buildings a meetinghouse. The first church was a small wooden structure measuring 58 feet by 38 feet and seated 150 persons.

As the dominantly Puritan town was boycotting its construction, workmen had to be imported into New Haven and boarded out among the parishioners. Beleaguered by Puritans (who greatly outnumbered the Anglicans, in spite of their being members of the "official", established religion of the Crown Colony of Connecticut), to proclaim its status in the larger British Empire, whose the British monarch has the constitutional title of Supreme Governor of the Church of England, a gold crown was placed atop the steeple. It was the sole steeple in a town that until then contained only Puritan meetinghouses that lacked steeples. The crown discreetly disappeared during the American Revolution.

In 1785, Trinity brought a pipe organ from the London builder Henry Holland, another item not then found in Puritan churches. In 1807, the top part of the steeple was replaced with a cupola, and the church expanded to make room for a choir.

The first wooden church's small wooden altar is still used for services today; it is located in the north side aisle chapel of the present building. In the wooden building, it was flanked by two Gothic arch-shaped tablets listing the Ten Commandments, which are presently displayed in Trinity's vestibule.

=== Second Stone Trinity Church 1814–1816 ===
By the early 1800s, the first church building, even after adding galleries, was too small to hold the rapidly growing parish. The earliest records of the intent to build a second church are recorded in notes from the Vestry meeting held October 20, 1810, at the home of Mr. John H. Jacocks. A site on the south side of the town Green was secured at a town meeting on December 14, 1812. That a church of Anglican origin was being allowed on the Green with the established Congregationalist churches was a testament to a growing tolerance of varied forms of worship in the new Republic.

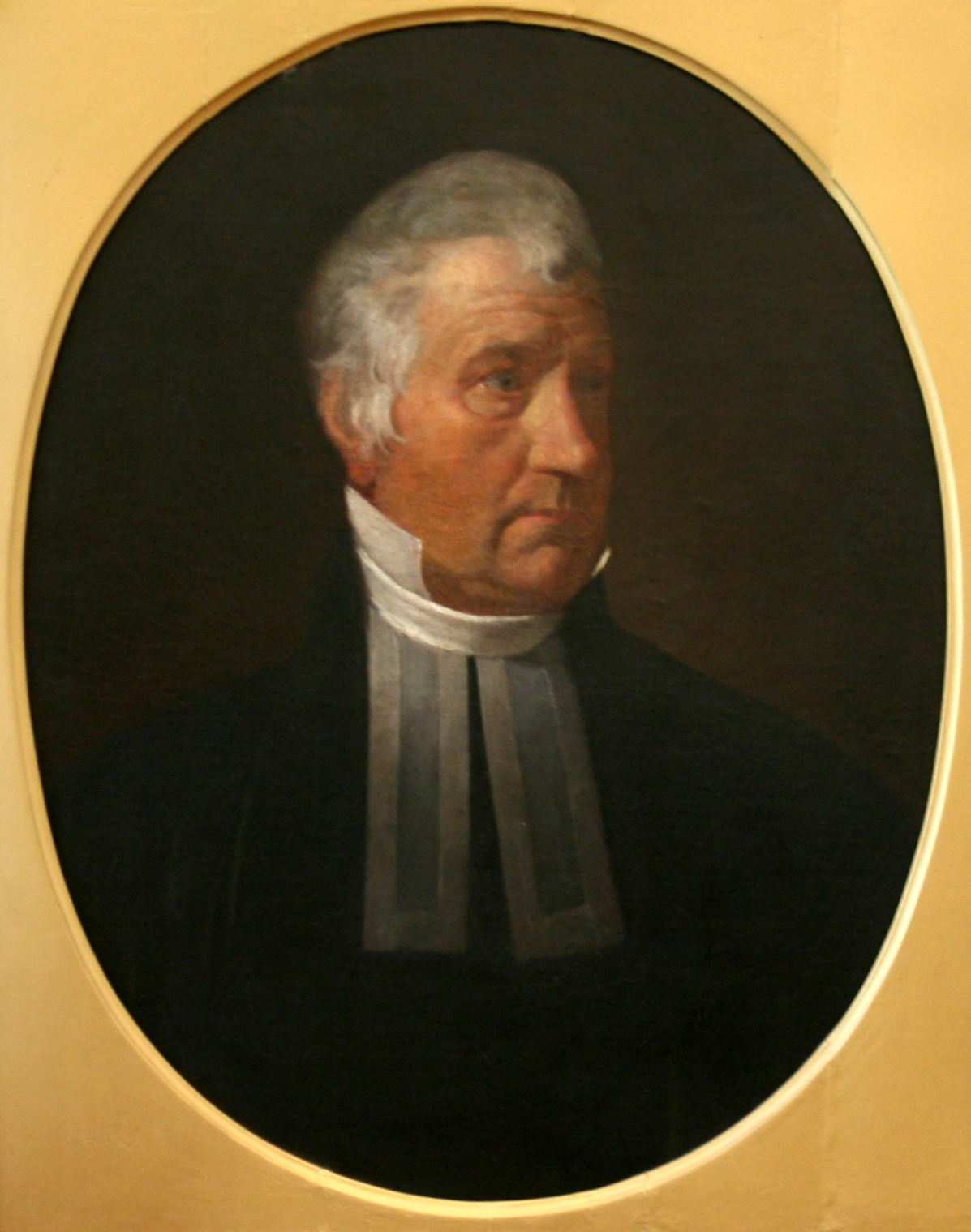
The Rev. Dr. Harry Croswell

Ithiel Town was selected as the architect. He designed the building in 1813. It thus predates St Luke's Church, Chelsea, often said to be the first Gothic-revival church in London, by more than a decade. In the Connecticut Journal newspaper on January 31, 1814, the Trinity Episcopal Society of New Haven placed an advertisement "To Builders", notifying them that "Proposals will be received by the subscriber until the 14th of February next, for the building of an Episcopal Church in this city. The building will be in the Common rock stone [New Haven Trap Rock] and built in the Gothic stile." Those who wanted to place a bid could "see the Plan or draft" kept in the New Haven offices of William McCracken, a member of the building Committee, who would only accept proposals "in writing and under sealed covers." Funding was raised by five-year pew leases, renewed as yearly rentals thereafter to support the church's ongoing programs. The distinctive numbered box pews with latchable doors on the pulpit-facing slips in the nave (though not the galleries) were already archaic in 1816, but reflect this early method of raising income.

The cornerstone for the building was laid on May 17, 1814, in a service that included an address by the Rev. Samuel Jarvis. The United States was at war with Great Britain at the time of its building in 1814; the church had to obtain permission from British Commander Hardy, whose fleet was blockading New Haven, to float its great wooden roof beams down the Connecticut River, along the sound and into New Haven Harbor. Commander Hardy reputedly said, "If there is any place on earth that needs religion, it is this New Haven. Let the rafts go through!"

The Gothic design of the building was chosen to distinguish Trinity from its two New Haven Congregationalist neighbors on the New Haven Green (both built in the more common Federalist style), and to express kinship with the Anglican tradition. The church "was heralded as the first attempt at Gothic in church building in New England, and one of the largest structures for that purpose in America" by Yale Historian Franklin Bowditch Dexter.

Work on the church was completed in 1815. It was consecrated on February 21, 1816, in ceremonies that extended over three days that included a sermon by Bishop John H. Hobart, the installation of the Rev. Harry Croswell as rector with a sermon by (future Bishop) Philander Chase, and the confirmation of 107 persons. About 3,000 persons attended the ceremonies in a building that could only seat 1,400 persons.

Attached to the publication of Bishop Hobart's sermon was a "Description of the building lately erected for public worship, by Trinity Church, in the city of New-Haven; by Mr. Ithiel town, Architect". Town notes that, "The Gothic style of architecture has been chosen and adhered to in the erection of this Church, as being in some respects more appropriate, and better suited to the solemn purposes of religious worship." The Rev. Harry Croswell attributed much of his success in growing the parish to its splendid architecture.

=== Description of the original Gothic building ===
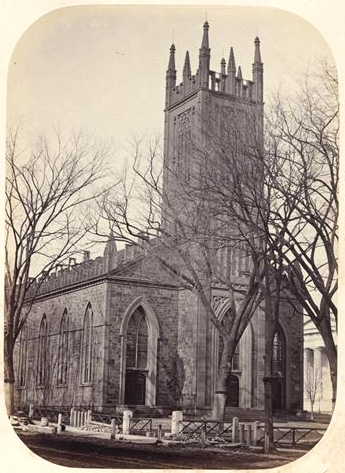
Trinity Church c. 1865, showing its original appearance

The reddish stone of Trinity's exterior was locally quarried seam-faced "trap rock" or diabase from Eli Whitney's East Rock Quarry in Hamden, Connecticut. According to Ithiel Town's description, the stone blocks were "layered with their natural faces out, and so selected and fitted as to form small but irregular joints, which are pointed. These natural faces present various shades of brown and iron-rust; and when damp, especially, different shades appear very deep and rich; at the same time conveying to the mind an idea of durability and antiquity, which may be very suitably associated with this style of architecture."

Diabase is a dark and very strong volcanic rock whose iron content weathers to a rusty orange-brown when exposed to the air, giving Trinity Church its distinctive reddish appearance with soft tints of orange and brown. Artists note that the church changes color with time of day and season, as well as with weather. Some 50,000 cubic feet of rough and hewn stone were used to raise the walls of the original church, which are five feet thick at the base of the foundation tapering to three feet at the top of the walls, 38 feet above the ground.

According to Town's description, the original church was 103 feet long, and 74 feet wide; the original stone and wood tower at the liturgical west or front end is 25 feet square projects forward with half of its footprint, making the entire length of the building 115.5 feet. The original stone and wood tower was 100 feet from the base at grade to its roof, and was capped with four corner frustums of elongated octagonal pyramids, each finished at their top with a decorative termination, iron-work, and vane, making their height 30 feet above the shallow roof of the tower. There were four other pinnacles, 20 feet high, placed between the pyramids and connected to the corner by a crenelated balustrade 7 feet high. There were five windows on each side of the building, and one just around each corner on the back end elevation, all twelve of which were 26 feet high and 8/1/3 wide. The great liturgical east altar window on this back end consisted of five lancets topped by a great circular mullioned Rose Window: In all, the altar window contains 1400 panes of glass, and was the greatest such window in the United States in its day.

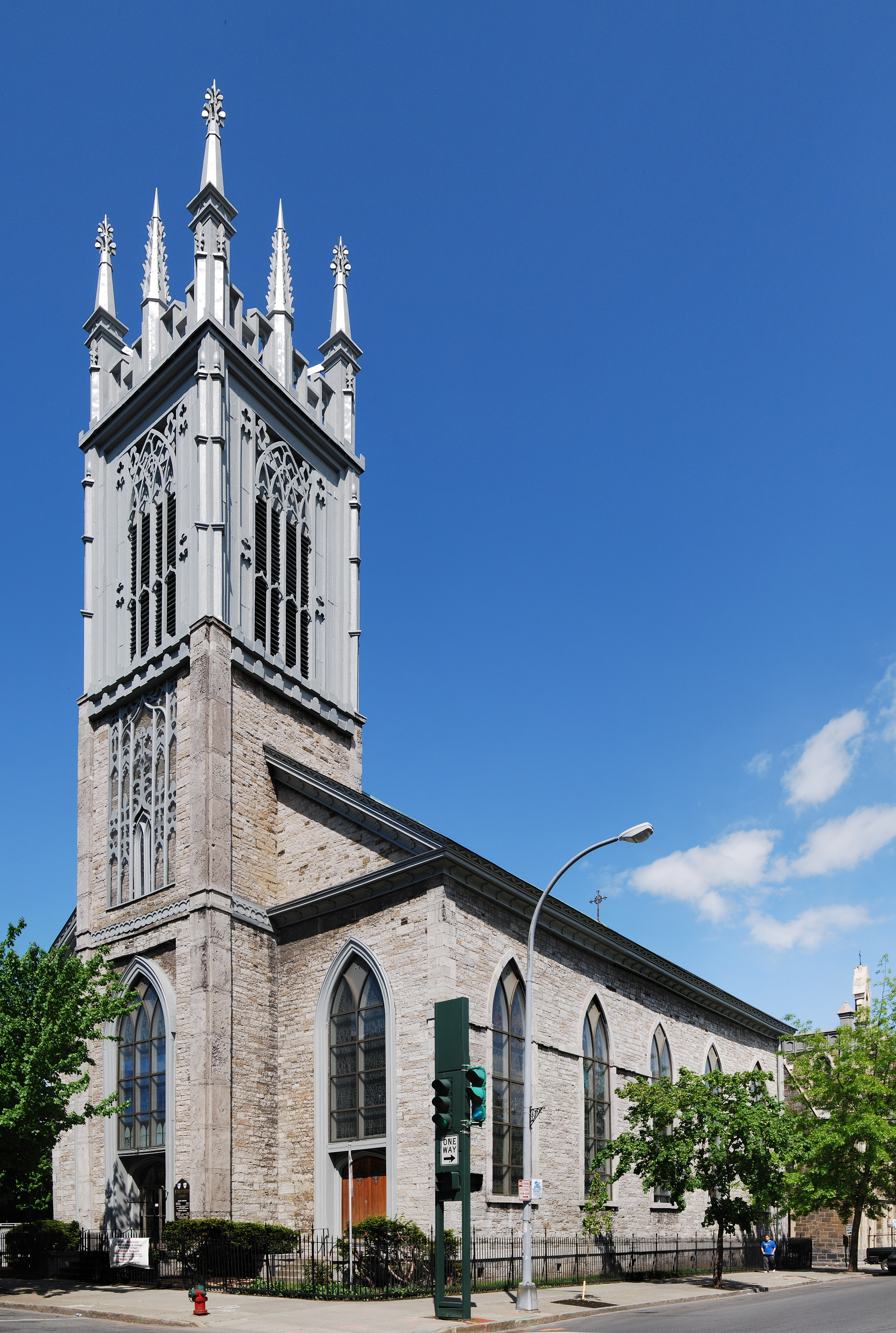
St. Paul's Troy, New York, 2009

St. Paul's Episcopal Church in the Hudson River town of Troy, New York closely resembles Town's Trinity Church except that it was built using a different type of stone of a different color: the building contract specified that the new church was to be a copy of Ithiel Town's Trinity Church in New Haven. While Ithiel Town may not have been on site at any time during St. Paul's construction, it appears he authorized the use of his original design for Trinity, given the accuracy of the replication. The major difference between the original Trinity and St. Paul's is that Trinity uses the dark, very hard red trap rock stone from the local Hamden, Connecticut quarry, whereas St. Paul's uses blue-gray limestone quarried in nearby Amsterdam, New York. Ground was broken for St. Paul's in 1826, and the church was finished and consecrated in 1828. It has been suggested that it reflects the original appearance of Trinity more than Trinity itself does, since Trinity's wood tower top was replaced with stone in 1871 and Trinity's 1884 Chancel and two flanking 1960s exit towers add to Trinity's original volume. St. Paul's stone and wood entrance tower, unchanged from its original form, lacks some of the original wooden corner pinnacle details noted at Trinity's original stone and wood tower. Both Trinity and St. Paul's lack their original wood crenelated nave roofline balustrades as well.

=== Nineteenth-century changes ===
"Extensive interior redecoration was undertaken at Trinity during the period from 1846 to 1849.". A comparison of the interior of the church before and after the extensive changes shows that the ceiling vault was extensively redesigned and the wooden columns were replaced by stone pillars. New Haven architect Henry Austin, a disciple of Ithiel Town, was "hired in 1847 to direct the decoration of the interior of Town's Trinity Episcopal Churches in New Haven. The major item listed on the expense account is 'frescoing'." Henry Austin was the 1844 translator of the book length A treatise on the pointed style of architecture in Belgium, by Antoine-Guillaume-Bernard Schayes. Influenced by his studies of the pointed style, Austin's high Gothic interior now contrasted with the early Gothic exterior. Gaslights were added in 1849. Henry Austin also designed in 1869 the Trinity George Street complex, comprising three buildings, the Trinity Home, the Church School, and a chapel in the middle; two of the buildings survive today, and hold the New Haven chapter of The Salvation Army.

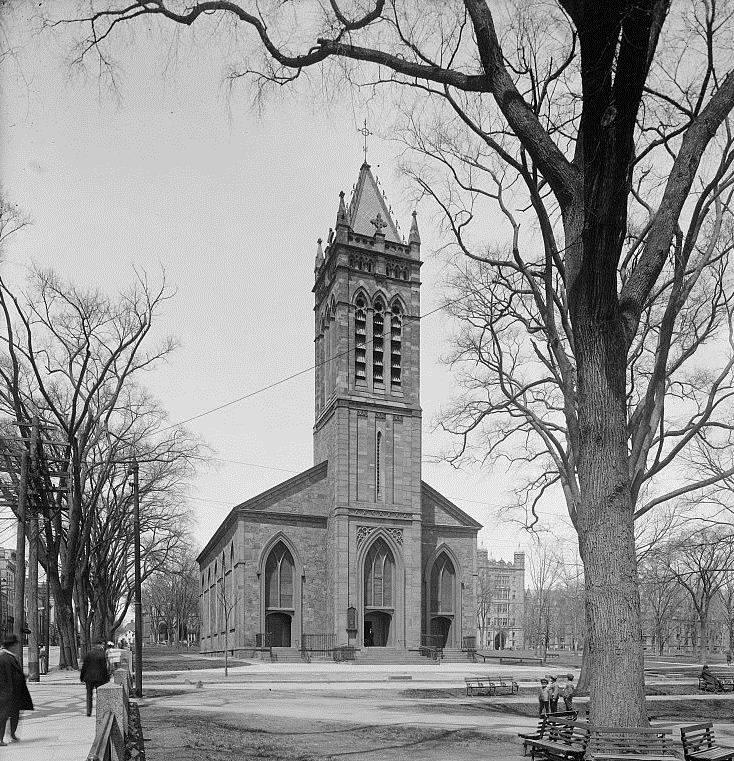
Trinity Church on the Green, New Haven, between 1900 and 1915

In 1871, during the tenure of the Rev. Dr. Edwin Harwood Trinity's rector from 1859-1894, Ithiel Town's wood upper portion of the tower was replaced with stone, and his wood crenellations at the rooflines were permanently removed due to their rotted condition. Stained glass windows were added from 1871 on through 1915, replacing Ithiel Town's original clear diamond-shaped panes set in lead, first with Grisaille windows throughout the nave (in 1871) and then with memorial windows replacing three of the grisaille windows between 1895 and 1915 by ones designed by Tiffany Studios. Further, the all-stone tower of 1871 was surmounted from 1893-1915 by a copper clad pyramidal roof spire.

In 1884, at the liturgical east end of the church, a chancel was added, raised up five steps from the level of the nave, accommodating Oxford Movement sacramental practices. Like his mentor Town, architect Henry Austin was a Freemason, and masonic symbol are also incorporated in the windows. In 1893, the present brass, tile, and marble pulpit was added, and in 1895 a donor presented to the church a fine ornamented marble high altar with two kneeling angels and a Chi Rho monogram. These changes, completed during the heart of the Gothic Revival period, were punctuated in December 1886 by a chime of ten bells installed in the entry tower.

=== Twentieth-century changes ===
In 1906, during the tenure of the Rev. Dr. Charles Otis Scoville, in response to structural issues caused by occupant weight loads to the much-used galleries of Ithiel Town's design, limestone surrounds to new steel columns replaced Ithiel's original wood cluster columns in the nave. A framework of steel was put in to support both gallery and roof. A new organ, having parts in chancel and gallery, was installed. This structural reworking required the complete removal of Harwood's stenciled nave ceiling. Visually strong gilt plaster groins rising from the limestone column surrounds formed the new nave ceiling, providing an effect reflective of a High Gothic cathedral.

On March 24, 1912, the Indiana limestone reredos in the chancel with its statues of Jesus, Mary, the Prophets and The Four Evangelists topped off by winged angels was dedicated by the Rt. Rev. Chauncey Brewster, replacing the dark Victorian wooden one, and adding to the cathedral-like effect. It was designed by architect Charles Coolidge Haight. The noted Yale sculpture teacher and carver Lee Lawrie carved the 17 statues standing in the reredos. The lower 11 statues in niche's are carved in the High Gothic style: they represent Christ in the center, flanked by Mary and Elizabeth, while the prophets Samuel, Elijah, Isaiah and Ezekiel stand in pairs on the Gospel side, and the evangelists Matthew, Mark, Luke and John stand in pairs on the Epistle side. The six tall, winged angels standing above are early Art Deco. The reredos thus shows the transition in style from high Gothic to modern in one work.

In the late 1920s, two additional memorial windows, this time by D’Ascenzo Studios in the manner of French Gothic windows of Chartres Cathedral, replaced more of Harwood's Grisaille windows.

Trinity parish built a parish house three blocks from the church at the corner of Whitney Avenue and Wall Street. The cornerstone was laid in 1923 and in August 1925 the formal opening ceremonies took place. It was designed by architect Charles Scranton Palmer, of Meriden, Connecticut, and built at a cost of $360,000; "it incorporated a lavish mixture of Tudor and Ivy League Gothic that allowed it to blend comfortably with its Yale neighbors. It contained three four-room apartments, a gymnasium, kitchen, dining room, offices and a jewel of an auditorium with seating for 416. In addition, there were (and are) many smaller rooms for classes, organizations, etc." In 1980, it was sold to Yale University and it now houses Yale's Whitney's Humanities Center.

In 1930, the pyramid or "candle snuffer" roof on the tower installed the previous century was removed. In 1961-1962 to provide fire exits and to improve the flow of communion takers, a two-story wing on both sides of the chancel was constructed using Eli Whitney's trap rock recovered from an old house on Wall Street belonging originally to the Daggett family that was being torn down to make room for a parking lot. In addition, an "undercroft" was dug out of the basement, and a choir room, kitchen, and 8 small class rooms around a central gathering space was created, allowing Sunday School and other events to be held at the church instead of the somewhat remote parish house.

When the choir moved to the new chancel in 1885, it became difficult to accompany the choir from the Hook organ's console in the gallery. The situation remained problematic, even though the Hook's mechanical-action console was turned around to face the chancel. In 1907 the Hook organ was replaced by a new organ built by the Hall Organ Company of West Haven, which had both gallery and chancel sections, played from a console in the chancel. Hall's nascent electro-pneumatic action proved troublesome, however, and that organ was replaced in 1935 by the present instrument built by the Aeolian-Skinner Organ Company under the direction of G. Donald Harrison. In the June 1935 issue of the American Organist, the new organ was reviewed: organ expert Emerson Richards gave it an enthusiastic review:

Trinity represents no passing fancy. It is not the product of a theory. It is the summation of four centuries of experience. We of the United States can be proud of our new artistic leadership . . . The Renaissance of the American organ has arrived.

Harrison's Aeolian-Skinner pipe organs are indeed considered by many to be the apotheosis of the American organ builder's art for their period. At Trinity Church, he retained the Hall Organ Company's handsome organ cases and three Pedal stops, but otherwise built an entirely new instrument, designated as Opus 927. The instrument has 78 ranks, 66 stops and 4,648 pipes, all played from a 3-manual console in the chancel. In 1949, Harrison made revisions to the chancel organ (some of which have subsequently been reversed), and in 1979, two Aeolian-Skinner stops from Opus 851 were added to the nave organ: Tuba and Vox Humana, the latter having been prepared-for in 1935.

Unfortunately, many of Harrison's Aeolian-Skinner organs have since been altered, rebuilt or modified in such a way as to no longer be entirely representative of his aesthetic. Trinity's organ is a notable exception. No electronic sound effects have been added, and even the builder's electro-pneumatic action technology remains intact, including its original "vertical selector" console and switching system, thereby preserving an important link with the history of American organ-building of that period. It is thus one of the best surviving examples of the "American Classic Organ," for which its builder is renowned.

Trinity, having been built on the New Haven Green, has always been limited in its possibilities for expansion by a legal restriction to within "two ox carts" from the outside wall of the church – about 3.8 meters or 12.4 feet. In 1961 and 1962, during the tenure of the Rev. C. Lawson Willard, 1940–70, in an event called "The Big Dig", the church was substantially enlarged by digging out under the church floor to create not a crypt or basement, but an English-inspired undercroft with choir rooms, classrooms, toilet rooms, a kitchen and meeting hall. Two-story towers were also added at this time to provide exits on either side of the chancel as well four small rooms for church use. Two more bells were added to the tower in 1957 with a bell console small keyboard installed adjacent to the organ console.

=== Twenty-first-century changes ===
An outwardly shining stained glass window, titled Trinity's History and Vision, designed by Val Sigstedt, a glass artist trained in the Tiffany tradition, was installed in 2002. It displays the then almost 300-year history and mission of the parish in nine quatrefoil medallions framed by an enveloping imagery of nature. "The Croswell," an elegant oak display cabinet in the vestibule, was built and installed in 2003, and a columbarium was dedicated in 2010; both were designed by M. J. (Peg) Chambers. Also in 2010, an accessible elevator and enclosure, designed by Robert Orr, and a side entry porch and updated undercroft, designed by Duo Dickinson, were completed. All these recent projects on the main floor and exterior of Trinity have been designed with sensitivity to the Gothic detailing of the entire building.

The Trinity Church Home Board has been a parish-affiliated tax exempt organization funding local philanthropy since 1934. It has active status as a 501(c)(3) Public Charity. In 2024, it reported total revenue of $84,509 and total assets of $1,455,094. The Home Board's directors are listed as Richard Lamere, Robert Werner, Margaret Atherton, Allan Atherton, Luk DeVolder, Bob Dorland, George Gillin, Lisa Levy, Linda Love, Warner Marshall, Charlotte Rea, Daniel Robles, Erica Robes, Jim Rothgeb, Deb Stewart, and Robert Windom.

== Ministers ==
The region that includes today's Trinity Parish in New Haven had seven Church of England missionary priests-in-charge from 1705 to 1778. They were funded by the Society for the Propagation of the Gospel in Foreign Parts (SPG), a missionary society that was founded in 1701 in London to spread the Church of England overseas. The Rev. Samuel Johnson remained priest-in-charge of Trinity Parish in New Haven from the time he founded it in 1723 until late in 1753, though he was assisted by a number of missionaries operating out of nearby town, and by lay-readers, including his son, William Samuel Johnson.

The Revolution in America not only separated Americans from the government and monarchy of Great Britain, it also severed ties with the Church of England. The seventh minister, the New Haven-born Ebenezer Punderson, began as a SPG missionary priest-in-charge, but on December 20, 1778 he became and independent Rector when the American Anglican churches could no longer be supported from England. In 1783, Dr. Hubbard became part of the Protestant Episcopal Church in the United States of America when is Connecticut colleague became its first bishop. From then on, Trinity would be led by members of the newly created Protestant Episcopal Church of America, and were entitled to be called Rector. From its founding in 1723 to 2017, there have been three missionary priests-in-charge of the New Haven parish region, eleven Rectors, and one minister (Hubbard) who was both.

Start	End	Minister	Birthplace
1723	1752	The Rev. Dr. Samuel Johnson, from Stratford, Connecticut. He was also founder of 27 Anglican churches and 43 parishes in Connecticut, and Founder and President of King's College (Columbia University); he built the first Trinity Church in 1752-1753	Guilford, Ct.
1753	1762	The Rev. Ebenezer Punderson, first priest resident in New Haven	New Haven, Ct.
1763	1766	The Rev. Solomon Palmer	Branford, Ct.
1766	1767	Interim - The Rev. Samuel Johnson returned to take charge when Palmer went to Litchfield in 1766.	Guilford, Ct.
1767	1812	The Rev. Dr. Bela Hubbard, who was the first Rector of the self-sustaining parish. He closed the church at the opening of the Revolutionary War, but reopened it on December 20, 1778.	Guilford, Ct.
1812	1814	The Rev. Henry Whitlock	Danbury, Ct.
1815	1858	The Rev. Dr. Harry Croswell, Founder of Washington College (renamed Trinity College)	West Harford, Ct.
1858	1859	Interim - The Rev. Samuel Benedict, assistant Rector	Litchfield, Ct.
1859	1894	The Rev. Dr. Edwin Harwood	Philadelphia, Pa.
1895	1898	The Rev. Dr. George William Douglas	New York
1899	1905	The Rev. Frank Woods Baker	Medford, Ma.
1908	1935	The Rev. Dr. Charles Otis Scoville	Montpelier, Vt.
1935	1939	The Rev. Theodore H. Evans	Virginia
1939	1940	Interim - Dr. Scoville (returning for one year)	
1940	1970	The Rev. C. Lawson Willard	Philadelphia, Pa.
1970	1977	The Rev. Craig Biddle III	Philadelphia, Pa.
1977	2009	The Rev. Andrew Fiddler	New York, NY
2009	2011	Interim - The Rev. James Sell	West Virginia
2011		The Rev. Dr. Luk De Volder	Brussels, Belgium

== Notable members and artists ==
- Henry Austin (December 4, 1804 – December 17, 1891) was a prominent nineteenth-century American architect who apprenticed with architect Ithiel Town. Austin worked in a range of styles, including Gothic Revival, Greek Revival, Italian/Tuscan, Egyptian and Indian/Moorish Revival styles. He is known today as the designer of the great Egyptian Revival style brown-stone gateway of Grove Street Cemetery, New Haven. He trained so many men in the fifty-five years of his professional life, he became known as the "Father of Architects."
- William Whiting Boardman (October 10, 1794 – August 27, 1871) was a lawyer from a wealthy and well known political family; he was the son of Senator Elijah Boardman. He was a Judge, Speaker of the Connecticut State House of Representatives, and a United States Representative from Connecticut.
- Lucy Boardman (November 19, 1819 - March 29, 1906) was the greatest woman philanthropist in nineteenth-century Connecticut, if not the whole United States. Originally from Portland, Ohio, she married William Whiting Boardman at age 36, on July 28, 1857, when Boardman was 63. After his death in 1871, Lucy donated most of her husband's fortune to charities at Yale, Trinity Church, and other charitable institutions in New Haven and around the country.
- Walter Chauncey Camp (April 7, 1859 – March 14, 1925) was an American football player, coach, and sports writer who is known as the "Father of American Football". He was married at Trinity Church in 1888.
- James Fenimore Cooper (September 15, 1789 – September 14, 1851), a famous American novelist and devout Episcopalian, likely attended Trinity Church when he was a student at Yale from 1802 to 1805, when he blew up the door of a vicious bully who beat him severely. Yale graduated the bully, but expelled Cooper, who was about 15 years old at the time.
- Abel Buell (1742–1822) was a silversmith, jewelry designer, engraver, surveyor, engineer, die cutter, armorer, inventor, auctioneer, ship owner, mill operator, mint master, textile miller, and counterfeiter. He is best known as the first type manufacturer in the United States, partnering with Isaac Doolittle to launch the domestic press manufacturing industry. In 1784, Buell published the first map of the new United States created and printed by an American.
- Ebenezer Chittenden (1726–1812) was an early American silversmith. He was born in Madison in 1726; he became a silversmith, and worked in Madison until moving to New Haven in 1770, possibly in company with his son-in-law and apprentice, Abel Buell. His mother was a sister of the American Rev. Dr. Samuel Johnson, of Stratford, Connecticut, known as "The Father of the Episcopal Church in Connecticut", and founder of Trinity Church parish in 1723, and the first president of King's College, now Columbia University, New York. His brother Thomas was the first governor of Vermont. He was also intimately associated as a skilled mechanic and friend with Eli Whitney, inventor of the cotton-gin.
- The Rev. Dr. Harry Croswell, D.D. (1778–1855) was the longtime rector of Trinity Church, an important figure in Federalist era politics, a hero in the struggle over freedom of the press in America in the case of the People v. Croswell, a major influence on the separation of church and state in America, an important figure in the history of New Haven and Trinity College, Hartford, the history of race relations and the negro struggle for equality in the pre-Civil War Episcopal church, and the author of a 5,000 page diary now in Yale Divinity Library.
- Frederick Croswell (1812 – July 11, 1863) was a judge of probate in New Haven county, and the author of the History of Trinity Church, New Haven written for the New Haven Colony Historical Society. He is also the subject of a printed work titled, An Address Made in Trinity Church, New Haven, All Saints' Day, Sunday, November 1, 1863, Commemorative of the Late Frederick Croswell by Edwin Harwood, 1863.
- The Rev. Dr. William Croswell (Nov. 7 1804 – Nov. 5, 1851) was the son of Trinity's rector Harry Croswell. He was a poet, a teacher, a journalist and newspaper editor, an author of hymns, and Founder and First Rector of Church of the Advent, Boston.
- Amos Doolittle (May 8, 1754 – February 2, 1832) was a copper engraver, silversmith, mapmaker, publisher, "tune book" printer, political cartoonist, founding member of the New Haven Mechanic Society, tax assessor, and member of the Masonic Fraternity, who is listed as author or illustrator of over 185 books, 100 Maps, 6 Musical scores, and other formats – with a total of 330 media listing him as "author". But he is best known as "The Paul Revere of Connecticut", as he was a silversmith who not only fought in the Revolutionary War, but engraved four copper plates with scenes of the Battle of Lexington and Concord, images that appear in almost every book on the American Revolution.
- Isaac Doolittle (1721–1800) was New Haven's first "Ingenious Mechanic". He is best known as the first person to build a printing press in America in 1769, which was a major milestone in American publishing. He was founding member of Trinity Church New Haven, and was perhaps the wealthiest and most important of the founders who helped build the first or wooden Trinity Church in 1752-3. He was variously a silversmith, a brass founder who manufactured the first brass wheel clocks in America – including hall or "grandfather" clocks – and who cast high-quality brass church bells, a silver watch maker, an instrument maker who created brass surveyor's instruments and mariners compasses, a printer, a "sealer of weights and measures", a "collector" of New Haven, and a grist miller. He was a fervent patriot and member of the New Haven Committee of Correspondence, and built two gunpowder mills in New Haven during the Revolutionary War to support the Connecticut's state militia, and was the designer and forger of the brass parts including the propeller on the Turtle, the world's first submarine used in combat and the first watercraft to use a propeller, as well as the designer of the first mechanical time bomb.
- Charles Coolidge Haight (1841 – February 9, 1917) was an American architect from New York City who designed the Parish house (1923-1926) that is now the Whitney Humanity Center at Yale.
- The Rev. Dr. Edwin Harwood (April 21, 1822 – January 12, 1902) was Rector of Trinity Church from 1859 to 1895. He was a considerable scholar. He was professor of New Testament and Mediaeval Church History in the Divinity School at Middletown. He was interested in church policy, and took a position of leadership in the councils of the Church as a founder and deputy of the General Convention of the Protestant Episcopal Church.
- The Rev. Dr. Bela Hubbard (1739 – 1812) was yet another disciple of the Rev. Dr. Samuel Johnson of Stratford, Connecticut. Hubbard was the missionary priest at Guilford and Killingworth until 1767 when the Venerable Society for the Propagation of the Gospel appointed him their missionary priest at New Haven and West Haven. He divided his labors equally between these two places until the Revolution, which despite some difficult times due to the British invasion of New Haven and having to suspend using the Book of Common Prayer as it called for public prayers for the King, he and his Church weathered fairly well. He was known for his charity and human sympathy, which made him the friend of every man regardless of creed or race, expressed by a lifelong, assiduous devotion to the needs of his parishioners. When the terrible yellow fever epidemic of 1795 struck New Haven, many fled to escape it; while Dr. Hubbard's ministrations to the sick were fearless and unceasing. He is also known as the first minister to keep records at Trinity Church.
- Abraham Jarvis (May 5, 1739 – May 3, 1813) was the second American Episcopal bishop of the Episcopal Diocese of Connecticut and eighth in succession of bishops in the Episcopal Church. He is buried beneath the altar of Trinity Church.
- The Rev. Dr. Samuel Johnson (1696 – 1772) is perhaps best called the "American President Rev. Dr. Samuel Johnson" to avoid confusion with the better known Dr. Samuel Johnson of London. Johnson, a Yale tutor and convert to the Anglican religion, founded Trinity Church parish in 1723. He was a renowned teacher, a brilliant language scholar, the founder of some 27 Connecticut Anglican churches and 43 parishes, for which he is known as The Father of the Episcopal Church in Connecticut, and the founder of King's College (now Columbia University). He is considered the first serious philosopher in America. There is an August 17 feast day of the Episcopal Church remembering him, his friend Timothy Cutler, and his disciple Thomas Bradbury Chandler.
- Lee Oscar Lawrie (October 16, 1877 – January 23, 1963) was one of the United States' foremost architectural sculptors, and a key figure in the American art scene preceding World War II. His work includes the details on the Nebraska State Capitol in Lincoln, Nebraska and the 1937 statue of Atlas at Rockefeller Center in New York City. He carved the 17 statues standing in the 1912 reredos.
- Charles Scranton Palmer (September 3, 1878 – August 17, 1954) was a Connecticut-based architect. He designed the Trinity Parish House, which was built between 1923 and 1926. Sold by the parish in 1980, it is now Yale's Whitney Humanity Center. Palmer designed several buildings in Connecticut, including the Torrington Armory.
- Oliver Sherman Prescott, Episcopal priest and Anglo-Catholic Ritualist leader.
- Nathan Smith (January 8, 1770 – December 6, 1835) was a United States Senator from Connecticut. There is a plaque just above the side altar to his memory.
- Ithiel Town (October 3, 1784 – June 13, 1844) was the architect of the 1815 Trinity Church building. He apprenticed with Asher Benjamin in Boston and became a seminal and influential American architect, making major contributions to the Federal, revivalist Greek and Gothic architectural styles.
