= People v. Croswell =

1804 criminal libel case

- Court: Supreme Court of New York
- Full case name: The People of the State of New York v. Harry Croswell
- Decided: February 13, 1804
- Citation: 3 Johns. Cas. 337 N.Y. 1804

Case opinions
- Judges deadlocked over whether truth of statements could be introduced by libel defendants

Keywords
- Defamation

The People of the State of New York v. Harry Croswell (3 Johns. Cas. 337 N.Y. 1804), commonly known and cited as People v. Croswell, is an important case in the evolution of United States defamation law. It was a criminal libel case brought against a Federalist journalist named Harry Croswell for his statements about a number of public officials, including then-President Thomas Jefferson.

Croswell was initially convicted in Columbia County court, where the jury was instructed to consider only the question of fact before them, as to whether Croswell had been the one to publish the statements at issue under a pseudonym. He appealed to the Supreme Court of New York, then the state's highest court, for a new trial on several issues including those instructions. In a famous and lengthy argument on Croswell's behalf, Alexander Hamilton tried to convince the judges that truthful statements should not be considered defamatory, regardless of what they concerned.

The judges deadlocked and Croswell's conviction stood, although he was never sentenced or retried. The following year the issue became legally moot as the New York State Legislature wrote Hamilton's argument into the state's libel law, breaking with English precedent under which the truthfulness of the statements alone is not a defense. Other states and the federal government followed suit. Since then it has been a cornerstone of American law on the subject that truthful statements are not actionable.

== Background ==
In 1801, the 22-year-old Harry Croswell, originally from West Hartford, Connecticut, moved across the Hudson River from Catskill, New York, where he had been apprenticed as a printer and learned the trade of journalism from his brother Mackay Croswell, moving to the growing port city of Hudson. A strong sympathizer with the Federalist Party of President John Adams, he took a job writing for the Balance and Columbian Repository, a newspaper with similar political leanings.

Around the same time, another journalist, Charles Holt, had come to Hudson. From Connecticut, he had sympathies that were strongly with the opposing Democratic-Republican Party, usually known as Republicans, of Thomas Jefferson. The two parties were often at odds, attempting to convince the public that their respective visions of the new nation and policies were the best and that those of the other party were flawed and would lead to disaster and tyranny. Holt came to Hudson to start The Bee so that he could counteract the influence of the Balance.

Croswell then convinced his own editor at the Balance to let him start The Wasp, a small sheet, dedicated to attacking and antagonizing Holt and disparaging Republican politicians and Jefferson. Croswell wrote under the pseudonym of "Robert Rusticoat". The two newspapers engaged in vicious and often witty exchanges over several months.

== Trial ==
In the September 9, 1802 issue of The Wasp, Croswell repeated a charge against Jefferson that had first appeared in the Evening Post, a New York City newspaper founded by Alexander Hamilton. Holt had mocked the Federalists' claims against Jefferson's character and said the worst they could say about him was that he had paid a fellow Virginian, James Thompson Callender, to attack the Adams administration in print. "This is wholly false," Croswell responded. Federalists had been charging that Jefferson had paid Callender not only to attack Adams but also to call the late George Washington "a traitor, robber and perjurer ... and for most grossly slandering the private characters of men who, he well knew, were virtuous." No supporter of Jefferson, he claimed, had ever responded, or would respond, to that charge "in an open manly discussion."

Ambrose Spencer, New York's Attorney General, took notice. Jefferson, a critic of the Alien and Sedition Acts passed under the previous administration, was encouraging the use of similar state laws against his many critics. Spencer, a former Federalist himself whose party switch had helped get DeWitt Clinton elected governor in 1798, was the target of one of Croswell's attacks in that same issue of The Wasp and so went before the Columbia County grand jury and got an indictment of Croswell on two charges of criminal libel and sedition. The defendant was accused of

... being a malicious and seditious man, and of depraved mind and wicked and diabolical disposition, and also deceitfully, wickedly and maliciously devising, contriving and intending, toward Thomas Jefferson, Esquire, President of the United States of America, to detract from, scandalize, traduce and vilify, and to represent him, the said Thomas Jefferson, as unworthy of the confidence, respect and attachment of the people of the said United States. ...

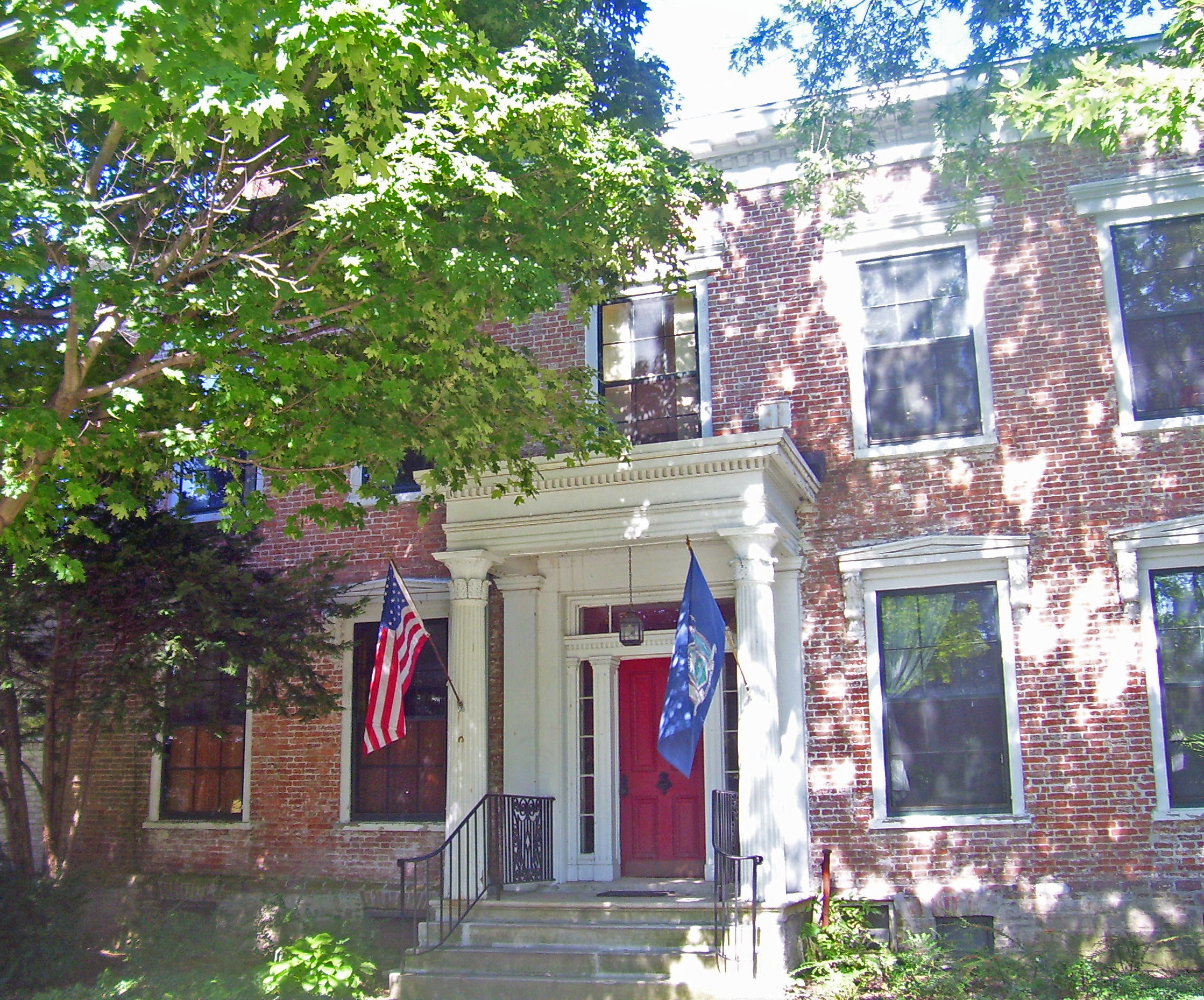
The courthouse in Claverack where the trial was held

On January 11, 1803, Croswell was arrested and brought to the county courthouse in Claverack, at that time the county seat. After the indictment was read, his attorney requested a copy of the allegedly slanderous documents but was denied. He also requested that the court continue the trial until Callender could be brought from Virginia to testify to the truth of the allegations.

That, too, was denied, and the trial began on July 11, 1803, with prominent anti-Federalist Supreme Court Justice Morgan Lewis presiding. Spencer prosecuted the case personally. Croswell, represented pro bono by a team of prominent attorneys, including William Peter Van Ness, pleaded not guilty to both charges. On July 17, 1803, one week after the trial began, Callender drowned in the James River, reportedly too drunk to save himself. Lewis instructed the jury to consider only the question of whether or not Croswell had beyond reasonable doubt indeed published the statements. He was convicted on both counts.

== Appeal ==
The Supreme Court heard the appeal on February 13, 1804. Alexander Hamilton, who had been unavailable to argue for Croswell at the trial, made a six-hour statement on his behalf. He built his appeal on three points:

- That the trial judge had erred in disallowing the continuance requested to allow Callender to testify;
- that the allegedly libelous statements were so substantially and materially different from what had previously been published in the Post as to not constitute libel, and
- that the judge erred in instructing the jury to consider only the facts of the case.

On the second point, Hamilton discoursed at great length, summarized in the opinion. Roman law had recognized truth as a defense to charges of libel; why had the English common law, from which the laws of New York derived, abandoned that, he asked. He found his answer in the Star Chamber, the secret medieval court that existed to try to punish those too powerful to submit to ordinary justice. "That is not the court from which we are to expect principles and precedents friendly to freedom," he observed. Hamilton concluded:

The right of giving the truth in evidence, in cases of libels, is all-important to the liberties of the people. Truth is an ingredient in the eternal order of things, in judging of the quality of acts.

James Kent agreed with Hamilton in a lengthy review of English law. The jury should have been allowed to consider the law of the case despite recent uncertainty in England as to whether that was sound in libel prosecutions. English law in the time of the Star Chamber had disallowed truth as a defense, saying "The reason assigned for the punishment of libels, whether true or false, is because they tend to a breach of the peace, by inciting the libelled party to revenge, or the people to sedition." But that, Kent held, had led to an overly tame English press, and laws in the new nation had already been tending toward allowing the truth, if justified, as a defense to a libel charge.

I adopt, in this case, as perfectly correct, the comprehensive and accurate definition of one of the counsel at the bar, that the liberty of the press consists in the right to publish, with impunity, truth, with good motives, and for justifiable ends, whether it respects government, magistracy, or individuals.

Justice Thompson concurred, but Lewis and the other justice concluded that the same English authorities required they affirm the conviction. The tie vote meant the conviction stood. But Croswell was never sentenced, and though he was eventually granted a new trial it never occurred. Thus the case was never disposed.

== Aftermath ==
In 1805 the New York Legislature wrote Hamilton's position into law: it was always lawful for a libel defendant to introduce in his defense that the statements at issue were true. That was written into the state constitution in 1821. In the meantime, similar provisions had also been added to the laws and constitutions of other states, some allowing even greater latitude. In 1809, the Pennsylvania General Assembly went the furthest by enacting into statute the provision that the truth of the charge alone was a sufficient defense in any criminal libel trial if the target of the alleged libel was an officeholder.

During the appeal, Hamilton had stayed with a friend in Albany, John Taylor. Over dinner one night with the Taylor family, he made some cutting remarks about Aaron Burr, his political rival. Charles D. Cooper, also in attendance, reported them later in the year, just days before the state's gubernatorial election. Burr lost and, blaming his defeat on Hamilton, challenged him to the duel that cost Hamilton his life.

== Legacy ==
Twenty years later, James Kent observed that courts had begun applying that standard to all civil defamation actions, regardless of who the plaintiff was. "If the charge, in its substance and measure, be true in point of fact, the law considers the plaintiff as coming into court without any equitable title to relief." He felt that a distinction still needed to be drawn between those in the public trust and others, with those accused of libel in the latter instance still required to justify their publication of defamatory, yet true, facts about those individuals.

Since many states later repealed their criminal libel statutes, the standard adopted for civil cases, where truth alone was a defense, became the standard for libel in the United States. A century and a half after Kent's commentary, the U.S. Supreme Court began distinguishing between public and private figures in defamation actions. In cases such as New York Times Co. v. Sullivan, Curtis Publishing Co. v. Butts, Associated Press v. Walker and Gertz v. Robert Welch, Inc., it afforded the media greater latitude, through the actual malice test, when challenged over allegedly false and defamatory statements by public figures than private ones.

Britain, as well as many of its former colonies, retains a libel standard where truthful statements with negative import must still be justified by some higher purpose to overcome a libel claim. In the 21st century, the Internet lessened the effect of international borders on the flow of information. This created some international issues when wealthy individuals filed suit against American authors in British courts alleging defamation. Some American states, including New York, have passed laws insulating their residents against what has been called libel tourism.
