= Franklin Bowditch Dexter =

Franklin Bowditch Dexter (September 11, 1842 – August 13, 1920) was an American author, genealogist, librarian, and university administrator affiliated with Yale University. He was a major historian of New Haven, Connecticut and Yale.

Dexter was a member of the Connecticut Academy of Arts and Sciences, and he was elected a member of the American Antiquarian Society in 1879.

== Works ==
- A Sketch of the Life and Writings of John Davenport (1875)
- The College Hymnal, for Divine Service at Battell Chapel, Yale College (1876)
- Memoranda concerning Edward Whalley and William Goffe (New Haven: Tuttle, Morehouse and Taylor, 1876)
- The Influence of the English Universities in the Development of New England (Cambridge: University Press, 1880)
- New Haven in 1784 ([New Haven:] no publisher, [1884])
- The Pilgrim Church and Plymouth Colony (1884)
- Biographical Sketches of the Graduates of Yale College (New York: Henry Holt and Company and New Haven: Yale University Press, 1886–1912)
  - volume one
  - volume two
  - volume three
  - volume four
  - volume five
  - volume six
- Estimates of Population in the American Colonies, from the Report of the Council of the American Antiquarian Society, Presented at the Annual Meeting held in Worcester, October 21, 1887 (Worcester, Massachusetts: Charles Hamilton, 1887)
- Sketch of the History of Yale University (New York: Henry Holt and Company, 1887)
- Selections from letters received by David Daggett, 1786-1802: Rread at the semi-annual meeting of the American Antiquarian Society, April 27, 1887
- A Catalogue with Descriptive Notices of the Portraits, Busts, etc. Belonging to Yale University (New Haven: Yale Corporation, 1892)
- On Some Social Distinctions at Harvard and Yale, before the Revolution (Worcester, Massachusetts: Charles Hamilton, 1894)
- (editor) Diary of David McClure, Doctor of Divinity, 1748–1820 (New York: Knickerbocker Press, 1899)
- An Historical Study of the Powers and Duties of the President in Yale College (New Haven: no publisher, 1899)
- (editor) The Literary Diary of Ezra Stiles (New York: Scribner's, 1901)
  - volume one
  - volume two
- The Manuscripts of Jonathan Edwards (1901)
- Abraham Bishop of Connecticut and His Writings (1905)
- Early Private Libraries in New England (1907)
- Student Life at Yale in the Early Days of Connecticut Hall (1907)
- Biographical Notices of Graduates of Yale College, including those graduates in Classes later than 1815, who are not Commemorated in the Annual Obituary Records (New Haven: no publisher, 1913)
- The New Haven of Two Hundred Years Ago (1913)
- Historical Catalogue of the Members of the First Church of Christ in New Haven, Connecticut (Center Church) A.D. 1639–1914 (New Haven: no publisher, 1914)
- The Removal of Yale College to New Haven (New Haven: no publisher, 1914)
- Ancient Town Records: New Haven Town Records (New Haven Colony Historical Society)
  - 1649–1662 volume one
  - 1662–1684 volume two
- Extracts from the itineraries and other miscellanies of Ezra Stiles, D. D., LL. D., 1755-1794, with a selection from his correspondence (1916)
- Jared Ingersoll Papers (New Haven: no publisher, 1918)
- Documentary History of Yale University, Under the Original Charter of the Collegiate School of Connecticut, 1701-1745 (New Haven: Yale University Press, 1918)
- New Haven Loyalists (New Haven: no publisher, 1918)
- A selection from the miscellaneous historical papers of fifty years (1918)
  - The Reverend Harry Croswell, D.D., and His Diary from Project Canterbury
