= Clarkson Chapel =

- U.S. National Register of Historic Places
- U.S. National Historic Landmark District – Contributing property
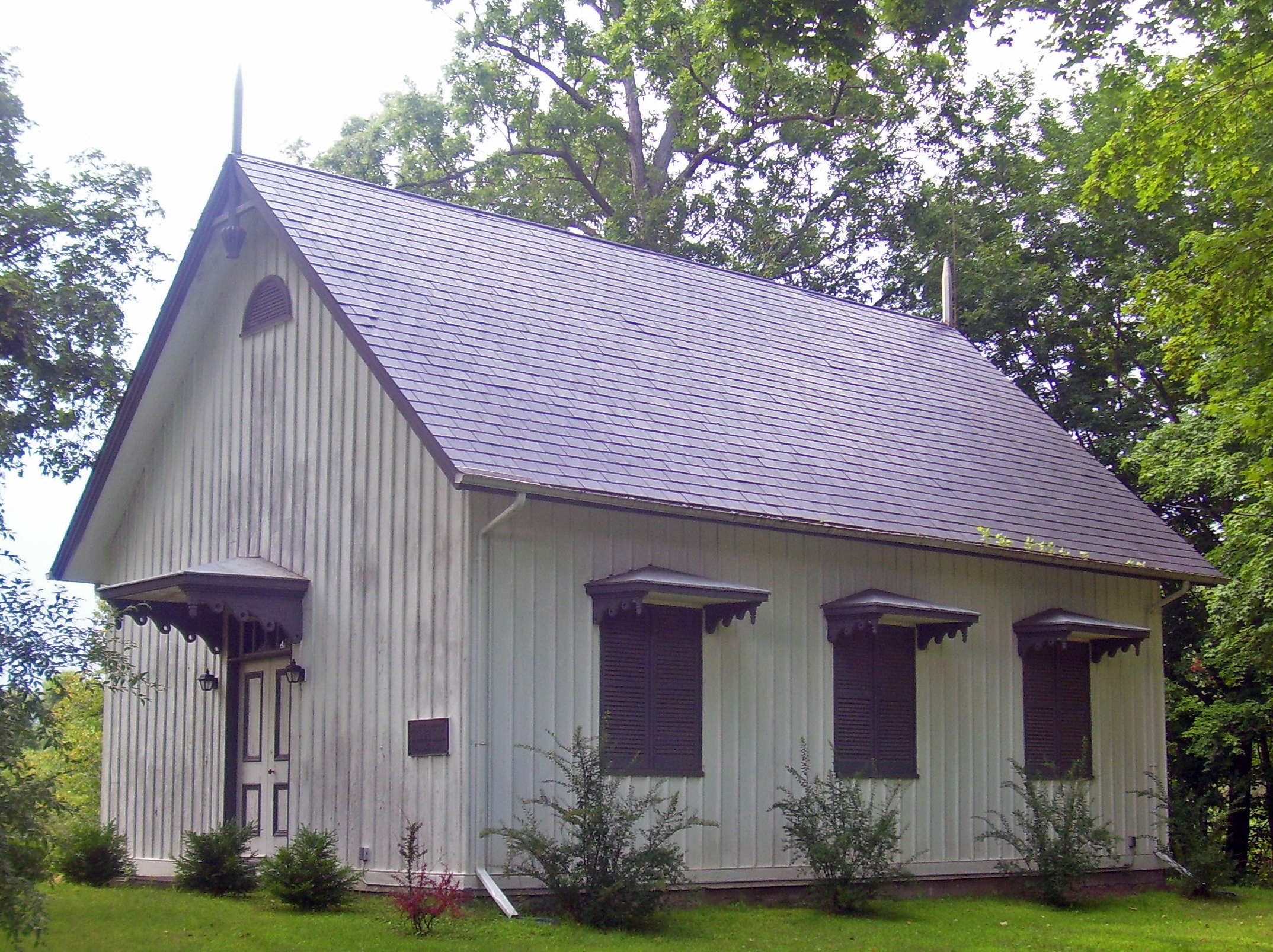
- South elevation and east profile, 2008
- Location: Clermont, New York
- Nearest city: Hudson
- Coordinates: 42°05′37″N 73°53′46″W
- Area: 1.1 acres (4,500 m^{2})
- Built: 1860
- Architect: Levinus Clarkson, Mary Livingston
- Architectural style: Carpenter Gothic
- MPS: Clermont MRA
- NRHP reference No.: 83003920
- Added to NRHP: 1983

Clarkson Chapel is located on New York State Route 9G (NY 9G) in Clermont, New York, United States, just across from the Coons House. It is a mid-19th century wooden building in the Carpenter Gothic style.

Levinus Clarkson, a local landowner who had married into the Livingston family, constructed it in 1860 for a group of dissident Episcopalians that included himself. At the time it was on the grounds of his estate, Knollwood.

In 1983, it was listed on the National Register of Historic Places. Nine years later, when the Hudson River Historic District was created and designated a National Historic Landmark, it also became a contributing property to that district.

It has since passed from the Livingston descendants to Columbia County.

== Building ==
The chapel is located on a 1.1-acre (4,500 m^{2}) lot on the west side of Route 9G, roughly 0.7 mile (1 km) south of the Stone Jug at the Jug Road intersection. It is screened from the road by a row of trees. A driveway approaches it from the southeast. The Coons House, across the road slightly north, is also listed on the Register.

It is a one-story frame structure with a steeply pitched gable roof and board-and-batten siding. Projecting hoods with scrolled brackets shield the windows and main entrance, a paneled double door with transom light. Pinnacles and pendants are at both gable ends, with a louvered vent beneath them. The bellcote is separate from the rest of the building, to the southeast.

Inside, the chapel has a center aisle between painted wooden pews. The furnishings include hanging lanterns and a cast iron wood-burning stove. A pump organ is also inside.

== History ==
In 1854, Levinus Clarkson, husband of Edward Philip Livingston's daughter Mary, left his position as vestryman at St. Paul's Episcopal Church in Tivoli, south of Clermont. He was joined by other congregants who had been alienated by a dispute. Six years later he built the chapel for the dissidents, on part of his Knollwood estate.

It was a personal application of the popular Carpenter Gothic style in a Picturesque setting. The chapel is still Episcopalian in its form and materials, and particularly the detached bellcote. Its decorative hoods distinguish from Richard Upjohn's similarly Gothic St. Luke's on US 9 elsewhere in Clermont.

The Livingston family retained it until the late 20th century, using it for special events. Later in the century it became the property of Columbia County, when developers defaulted on their taxes for a nearby horse farm. In 2001, the environmental group Scenic Hudson obtained an easement for a trail that would connect the site to the horse farm at Clermont State Historic Site to the east.

== See also ==
- National Register of Historic Places listings in Columbia County, New York
