= German Reformed Sanctity Church Parsonage =

Historic church in New York, United States

- U.S. National Register of Historic Places
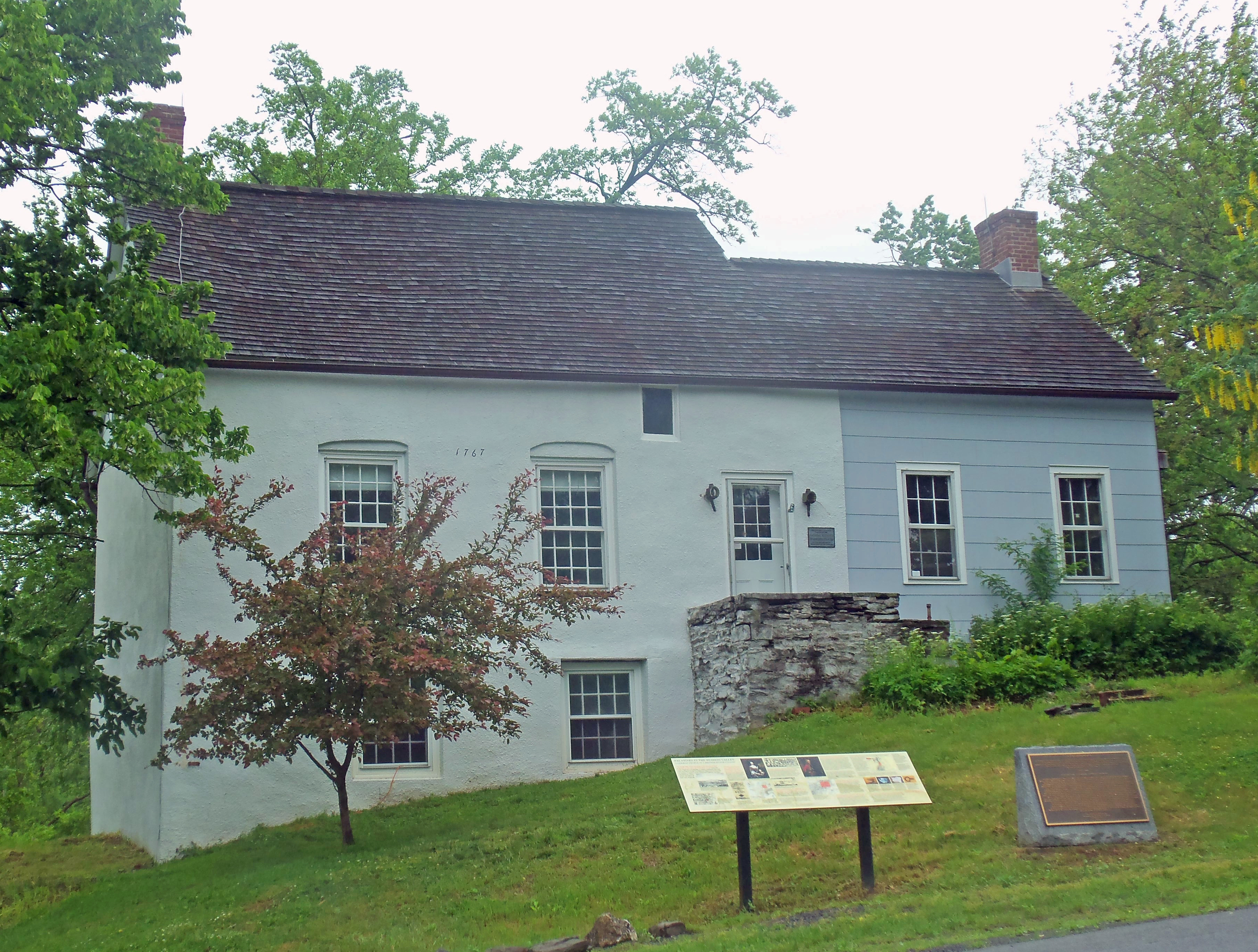
- South (front) facade, 2013

- Location within New York Location within the United States
- Location: Germantown, New York
- Coordinates: 42°8′30″N 73°52′57″W
- Area: 1.3 acres (5,300 m^{2})
- Built: c. 1746
- NRHP reference No.: 76001209
- Added to NRHP: January 30, 1976

The German Reformed Sanctity Church Parsonage, also known as the First Reformed Church Parsonage, is located on Maple Avenue in Germantown, New York, United States. It is a wood, brick and stone building dating to the mid-18th century, the oldest building in the town of Germantown. In 1976 it was listed on the National Register of Historic Places.

At the time of its construction the area, known as East Camp, supported a thriving Palatine German population. The residents were either refugees who had fled to England during the War of the Spanish Succession and been resettled in the Hudson Valley as part of a failed scheme to produce naval stores in the Hudson Valley, or their descendants; many later generations in turn moved on to other areas. The church had been established shortly after the first Palatines arrived; the parsonage was built in the 1740s. Two decades later it was expanded to its current size.

The church sold the house in the early 19th century; its pastors continued to live there for another quarter-century. Throughout most of the later 19th and 20th centuries it housed different local families, primarily African American. By the 1940s it required extensive renovations that added modern amenities.

Today it is the property of the town of Germantown. It houses the town's history department. An archaeological dig in the vicinity by a professor at nearby Bard College has yielded many artifacts, some of which are on display inside. Information about Bard's dig can be found online in a Germantown Exhibits portal.

== Building ==
The parsonage sits on a 1.3-acre (5,300 m^{2}) lot on the north side of Maple Avenue, roughly a thousand feet (300 m) east of New York State Route 9G, on the northern edge of the developed areas of central Germantown. Its neighborhood is rural in character, with two farms to the west on either side of Maple and houses on similarly sized lots to the east. On the north is a large woodlot; a smaller one to the south buffers the baseball diamonds and fields of nearby Palatine Park. The terrain slopes gently westward to the Hudson River, a half-mile (800 m) in that direction.

In front of the building is a low stone wall, a memorial to the early settlers and a modern interpretive plaque. The parsonage itself is a one-and-a-half-story five-by-three-bay structure in two sections, one fieldstone, the other wooden with a side-gabled roof. Brick chimneys pierce the roof at either end. It is built into a slope that exposes the basement on the east side.

The walls of the eastern section are three feet (1 m) thick; consisting of stone blocks faced with stucco and bound by hair and lime mortar in an interior and exterior section with dead air space in between and painted on the outside. On the west the structural system consists of wood frame filled with bricks and faced in asbestos shingles. All windows are recessed and set with double-hung sash.

Window treatments depend on the location. On the exposed portion of the basement, the two windows are eight-over-eight in plain surrounds. Above, on the first story, they are 12-over-12 in recessed surrounds topped by a slight decorative recessed arch over the lintel. The east section is set with two six-over-six modern storm windows in plain surrounds. A small single-pane casement window is located just below the roofline between the center bay and the first one to its west.

On the sides, the building is blind on its basement and first story. The rear has one door leading to the kitchen and another to the cellar. Above a cornice at the south elevation's roofline, the east gable field is faced in wood, with two one-over-one double-hung sash. The steeply pitched roof has slight overhanging eaves and is covered in slate shingles.

The main entrance consists of a modern two-paned glass door in front of an older wooden door with recessed panels on its bottom portion below a 12-light top section. It opens into the central hallway, with two rooms to the east and one to the west. Flooring throughout the house is original wide planks of pine; original pine woodwork remains in many rooms as well. The only exception is the cellar, with its original pressed clay floor. It also has a large fireplace with an oven. Upstairs, the garret is divided into three small rooms separated by a central hall.

Between 2010 and 2014, students at Bard Archaeology's Field School, under the direction of Christopher Lindner, PhD, excavated the buried 18th century well and reconstructed the outer wall with the rocks that had filled the shaft's 10-foot depth. The lawn hid the slabs that rested under a thick layer of earth. A slide show of the process can be viewed online at Bard College's Archeology site.

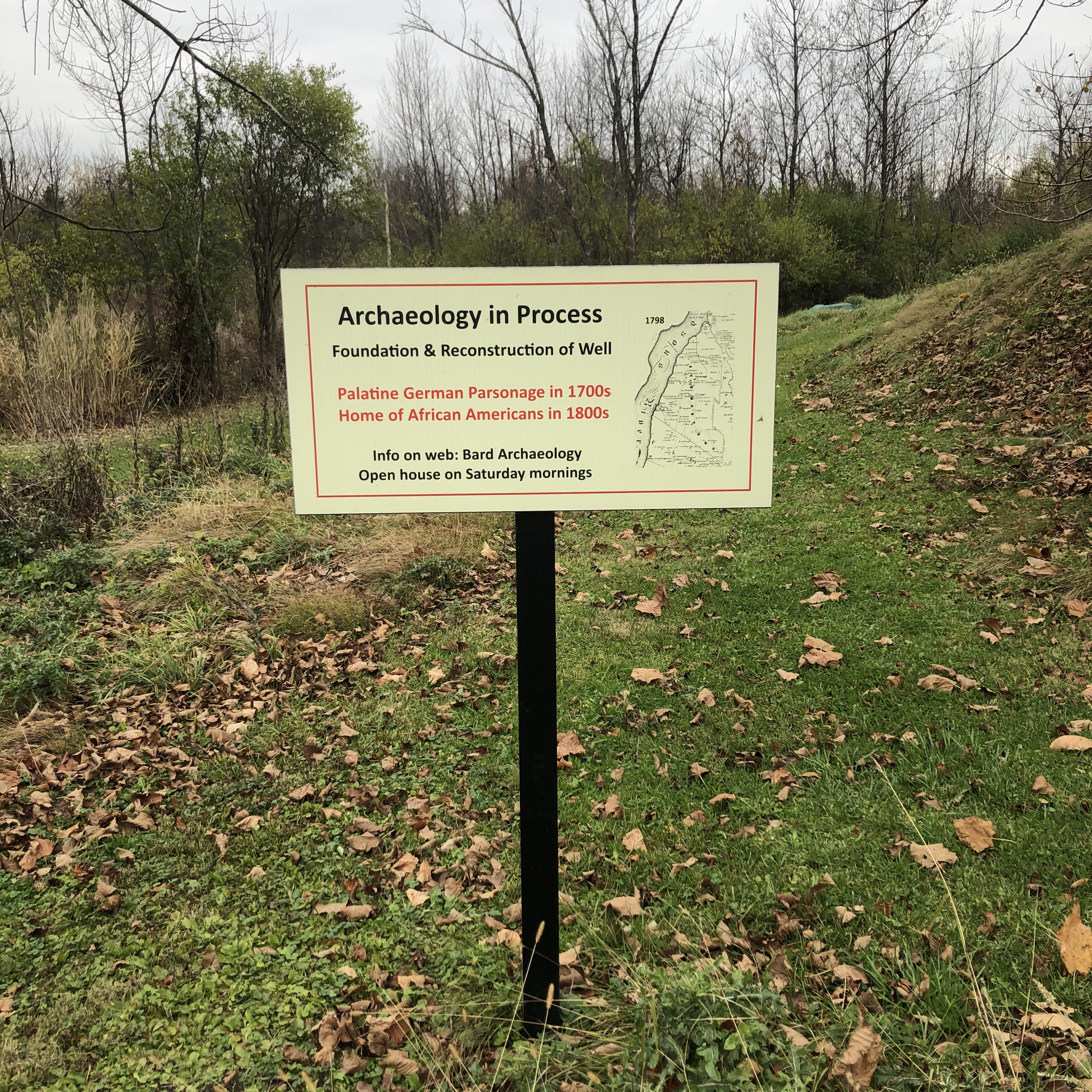
Plaque from Bard 2017 Parsonage Archaeohistory Project;

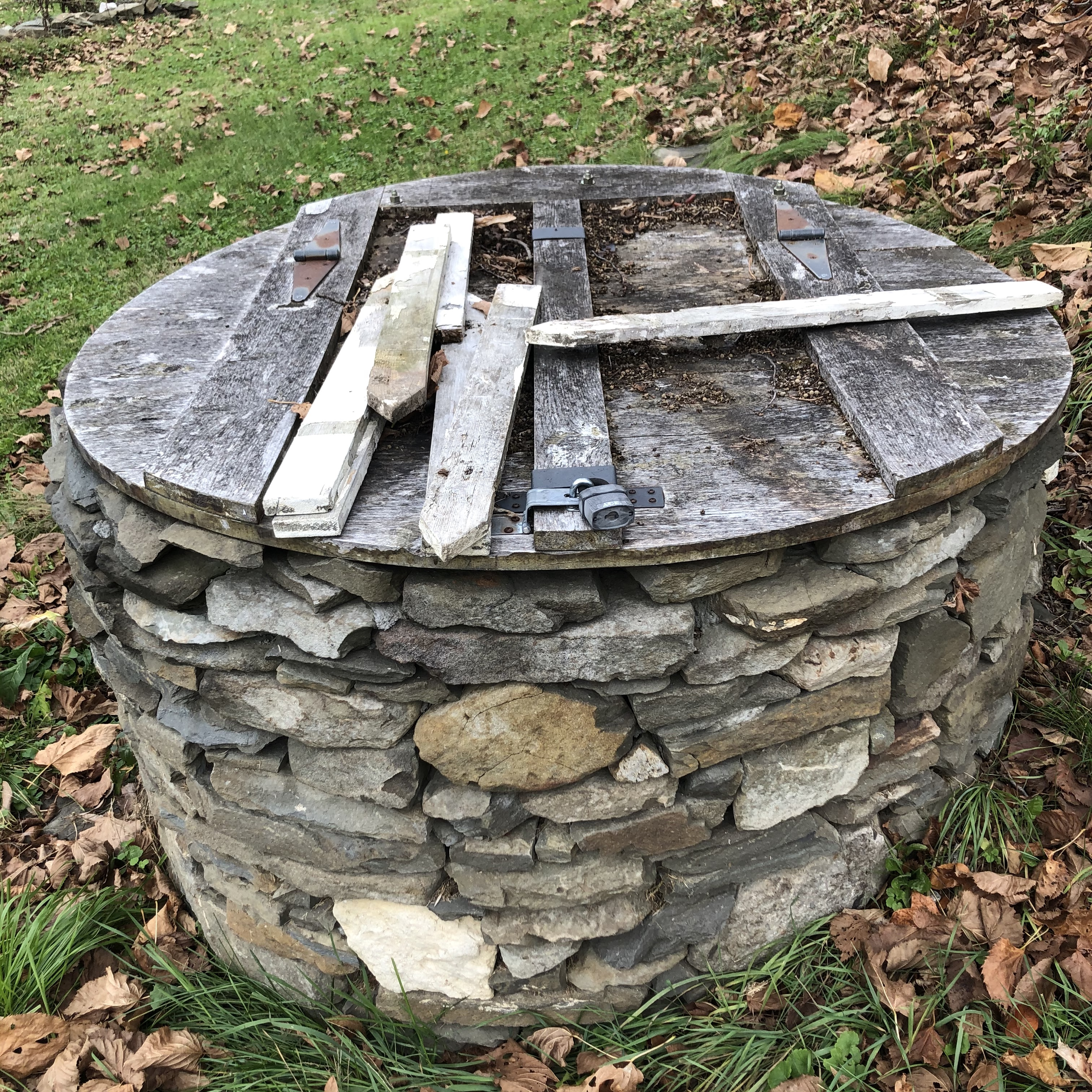
Well with reconstructed wall

== History ==
Displaced by the War of the Spanish Succession, refugees from Germany made their way to England in great numbers during 1709. They came to be known as Palatines even though not all of them were from the Palatinate region in the middle Rhine Valley. At a loss for how to handle them, the British government embraced a plan to resettle them in the upper Hudson Valley, where in return for their passage across the Atlantic they would collect pitch pine tar for the Royal Navy, replacing naval stores previously sourced from the Baltic areas. Their presence on land colonial governor Robert Hunter had purchased for the crown from landowner Robert Livingston the Elder, one tract on the present site of Germantown, would also shore up the northern frontier of the Province of New York from the threat posed by the French to the north.

Within two years of the Palatines' 1710 arrival, the naval stores venture had failed due to lack of support in Parliament and the settlers' unwillingness to see themselves as government employees. Afterwards, some left for other areas of New York, going either south to today's Rhinebeck or northwest to the Mohawk Valley. Finding the terrain similar to that they had left behind in Germany, the 63 Palatine families in the "East Camp" area established farms, and by 1726 those lands were officially transferred to them by letters patent.

The German Reformed Sanctity Church was established by the Palatines soon after they settled in East Camp. By the 1720s a church (no longer extant) had been built roughly two blocks west of the parsonage site. Land records show the church owned the parsonage land as early as 1741. While some sources suggest the parsonage had been built by 1743, it had likely been built by 1746, when Casper Ludwig Schnoor was hired as the church's first resident pastor.

At that time the building consisted solely of its current western section. The entrance was originally what is now the west window of the cellar on the south elevation. It is possible also that the second story and attic were added later. As a whole the structure is architecturally similar to other edifices built by the Palatines in the Germantown area as well as in other areas settled by Germans around the same time, such as the Rondout Creek valley near New Paltz and, outside of New York, some areas of Pennsylvania.

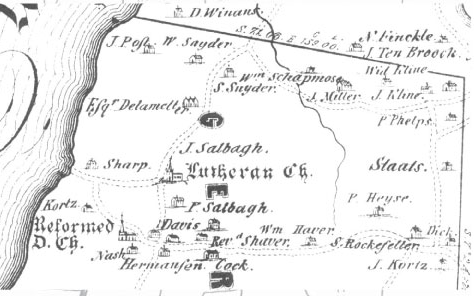
1798 map of Germantown showing church and parsonage

Schnoor was replaced by Johannes Casparus Rubel in 1751. He remained there longer than his predecessor, at least through 1767 when the parsonage was expanded with the construction of the eastern wing. In 1805 the church sold the building to a woman named Maria Delamater. Its pastors continued to live there until 1829, when it was sold to a local doctor of Dutch descent named Wessel Ten Broeck Van Orden.

Van Orden lived in the house for another two decades. After him it passed through a number of local families, primarily African Americans whom local lore has it were once slaves in the area, bought it. By that time, 200 years after its construction, the house had severely deteriorated. lived there for several generations. In 1944 the Ekert family, then of Long Island, bought it. By that time, 200 years after its construction, the house had severely deteriorated.

The ensuing restoration efforts were extensive, aimed primarily at repairing the building's structural system. New framing members were cut from local oak to replace the existing ones in the west section, reinforced by concealed steel girders above the windows. Rotten floor joists were likewise capped with steel. The chimneys were repaired and the cellar door on the south facade converted into a window (supposedly for security reasons). On the inside, the kitchen was modernized and the house wired for electricity. Modern plumbing and heating systems were also added, in a way that detracted from the house's historic appearance as little as possible.

In 1990 the Ekerts left the house to the town. It has used it as headquarters for its historian. In the late 2000s Christopher Lindner, an archaeologist at Bard College in nearby Annandale, concentrating on Hudson Valley sites, began leading digs in the vicinity of the parsonage. These have yielded pottery fragments such as china dating to the early years of the parsonage, suggesting that the pastors of that era lived like wealthy members of society. Some of them have been placed on exhibit in the house, which is open to visitors on Saturdays. There is also evidence suggesting a former second structure in the yard to the west.

== See also ==
- National Register of Historic Places listings in Columbia County, New York
