= Clermont Civic Historic District =

Historic district in New York, United States

- U.S. National Register of Historic Places
- U.S. Historic district
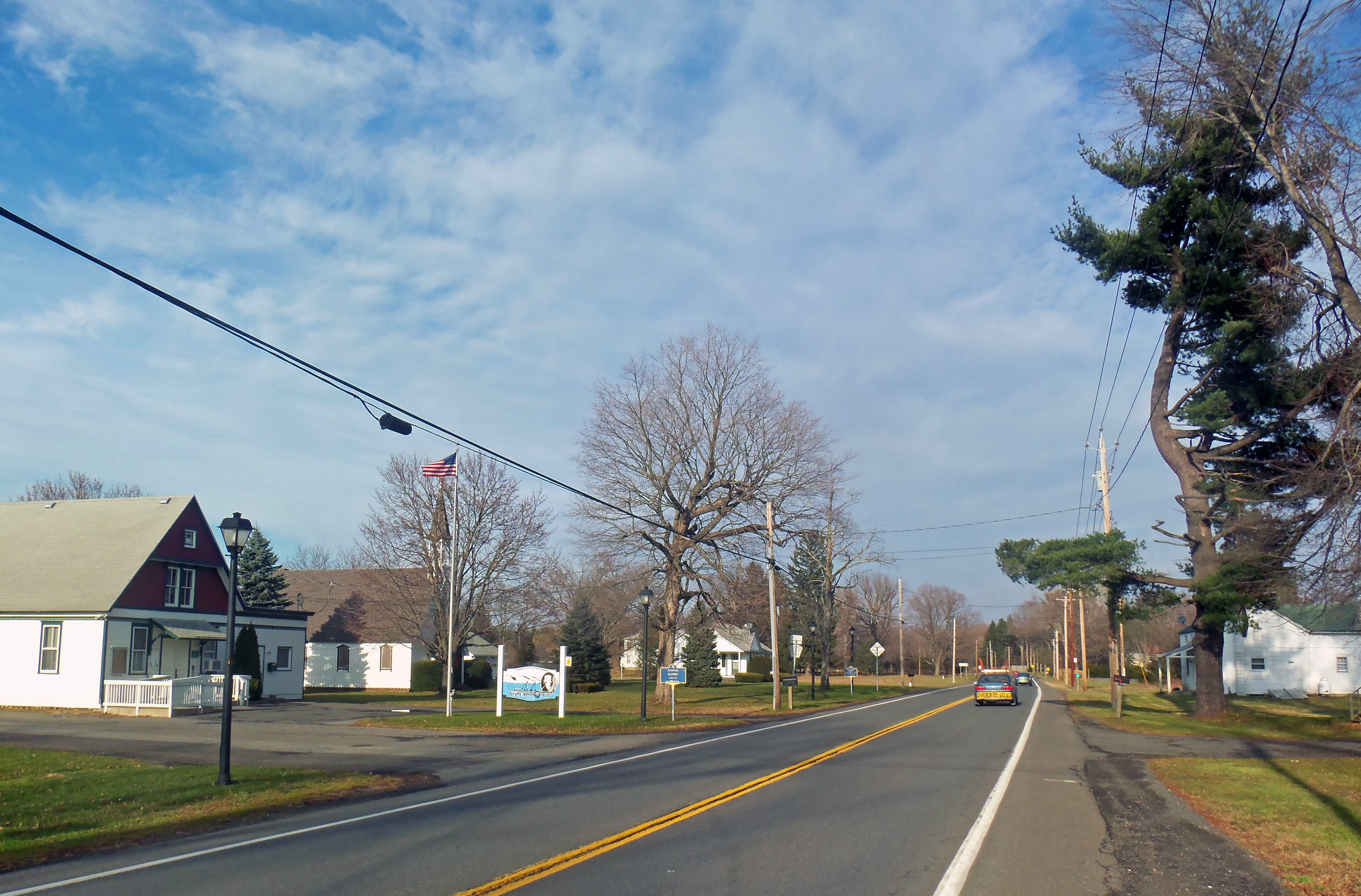
- View north along US 9 through the district, 2012

- Location within New York Location within the United States
- Location: 1795 US 9, Clermont, New York
- Coordinates: 42°5′14″N 73°49′34″W
- Area: 3 acres (1.2 ha)
- Built: 1834
- Architectural style: Federal, Gothic Revival, Queen Anne
- MPS: Clermont MRA
- NRHP reference No.: 03000604
- Added to NRHP: July 3, 2003

Clermont Civic Historic District is a national historic district located at Clermont in Columbia County, New York. The district includes one contributing building and one contributing site: the Clermont Town Hall and the Clermont Cemetery. Within the district boundaries, but listed separately are Clermont Academy and St. Luke's Church. The district unites the three buildings and cemetery.

The Clermont Town Hall is a modest Queen Anne–style building constructed in 1894. It is one and one half stories, with a high-pitched gable roof and set on a low stone foundation. The Clermont Cemetery was established about 1850 and is next to St. Luke's Church. It includes approximately 300 burials, mostly dated from the mid-19th to mid-20th centuries.

It was listed on the National Register of Historic Places in 2003.
