= Charles H. Coons Farm =

- U.S. National Register of Historic Places
- U.S. Historic district
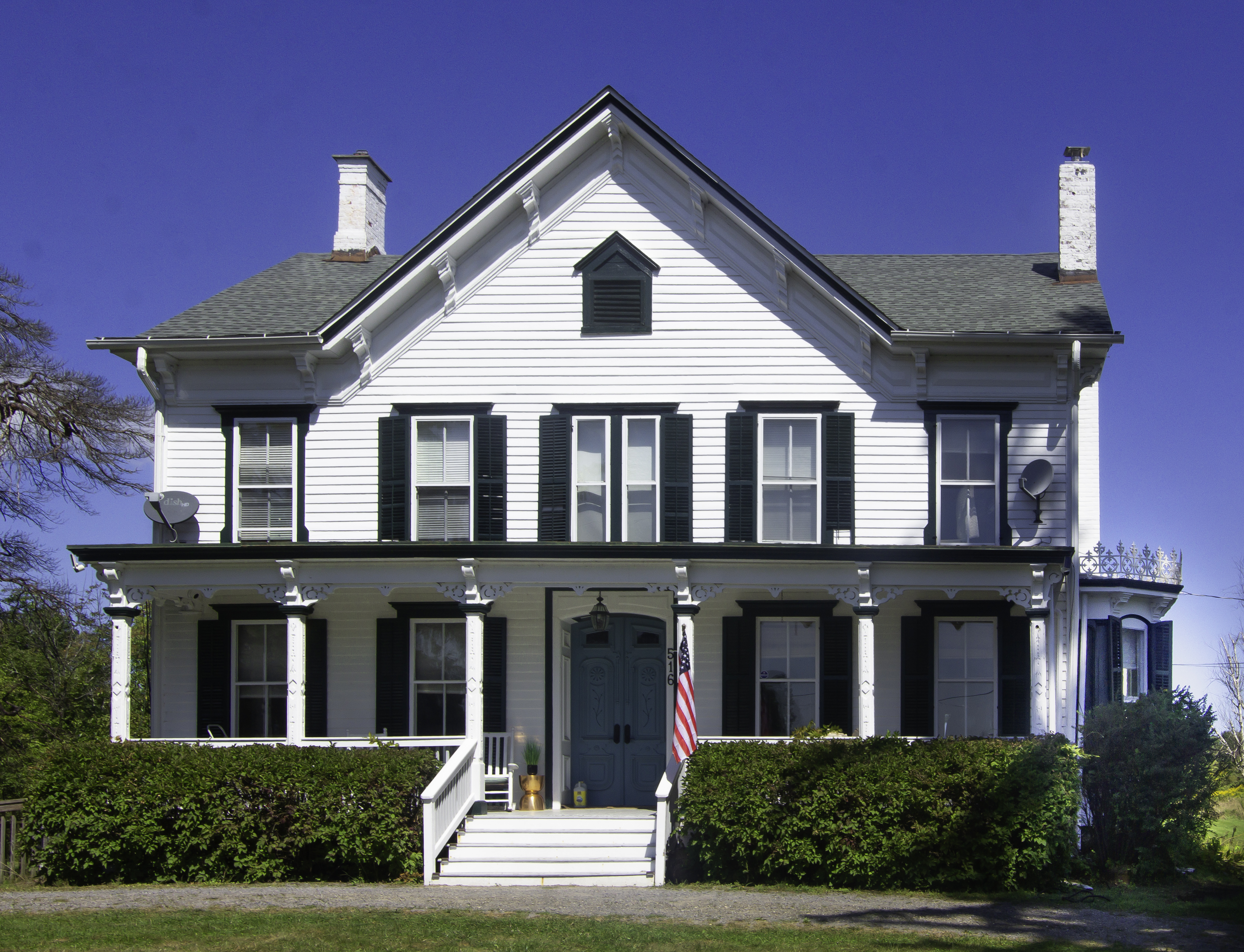

- Location within New York Location within the United States
- Location: 516 Church Ave., Germantown, New York
- Coordinates: 42°06′43″N 73°53′06″W
- Area: 5.95 acres (2.41 ha)
- Built: c. 1810, c. 1880
- Architectural style: Italianate
- NRHP reference No.: 15000475
- Added to NRHP: July 22, 2015

Charles H. Coons Farm, also known as the Prospect Fruit Farm, is a historic home and farm and national historic district located at Germantown, Columbia County, New York. The main farmhouse was built about 1880, and is a two-story, rectangular frame dwelling with Italianate style design elements. It sits on a stone foundation and has an intersecting gable roof. The front facade features a full-width veranda. Also on the property are the contributing New World Dutch Barn and attached shed (c. 1810), Horse Barn (c. 1880), Small Shed (c. 1900), and Windmill and water pump (c. 1910).

It was added to the National Register of Historic Places in 2015.
