= Hickory Hill (Clermont, New York) =

Historic home in Clermont, New York

- U.S. National Register of Historic Places
- Location within New York Location within the United States
- Location: Buckwheat Bridge Rd., Clermont, New York
- Coordinates: 42°5′39″N 73°49′6″W
- Area: 14.6 acres (5.9 ha)
- Built: 1859
- Architectural style: Greek Revival
- MPS: Clermont MRA
- NRHP reference No.: 83003934
- Added to NRHP: October 7, 1983

Hickory Hill is a historic home located at Clermont in Columbia County, New York. The house was built in 1859 and is a square, two-story, frame residence with a distinctive three-bay pedimented facade in a late Greek Revival style. It features a full-width, one-story porch supported by Ionic order columns. Also on the property is a brick smoke house. It was added to the National Register of Historic Places in 1983.
