= Dick House =

Historic house in New York, United States

- U.S. National Register of Historic Places
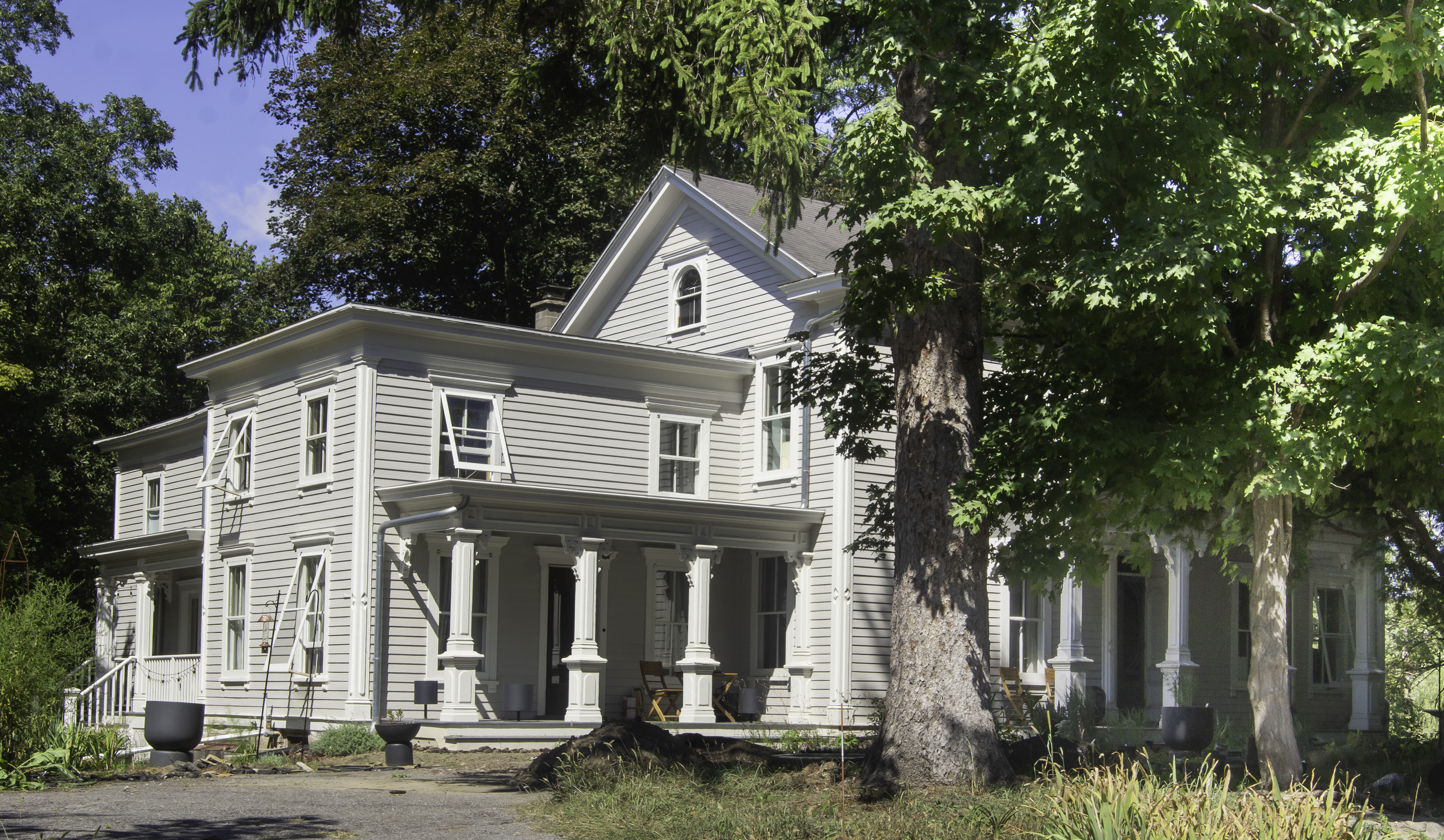

- Location within New York Location within the United States
- Location: 641 Co. Rte. 8, Germantown, New York
- Coordinates: 42°7′36.42″N 73°51′17.2″W
- Area: 3.6 acres (1.5 ha)
- Built: 1860
- Architectural style: Italianate
- NRHP reference No.: 09000573
- Added to NRHP: July 29, 2009

Dick House is a historic home located at Germantown in Columbia County, New York. It was built about 1860 and is five bays wide and two bays deep with a gable roof. There is a flat roofed west wing. It has a center hall plan with Italianate style detailing on the interior.

It was added to the National Register of Historic Places in 2009.
