= Stone Jug =

Historic house in New York, United States

- U.S. National Register of Historic Places
- U.S. National Historic Landmark District – Contributing property
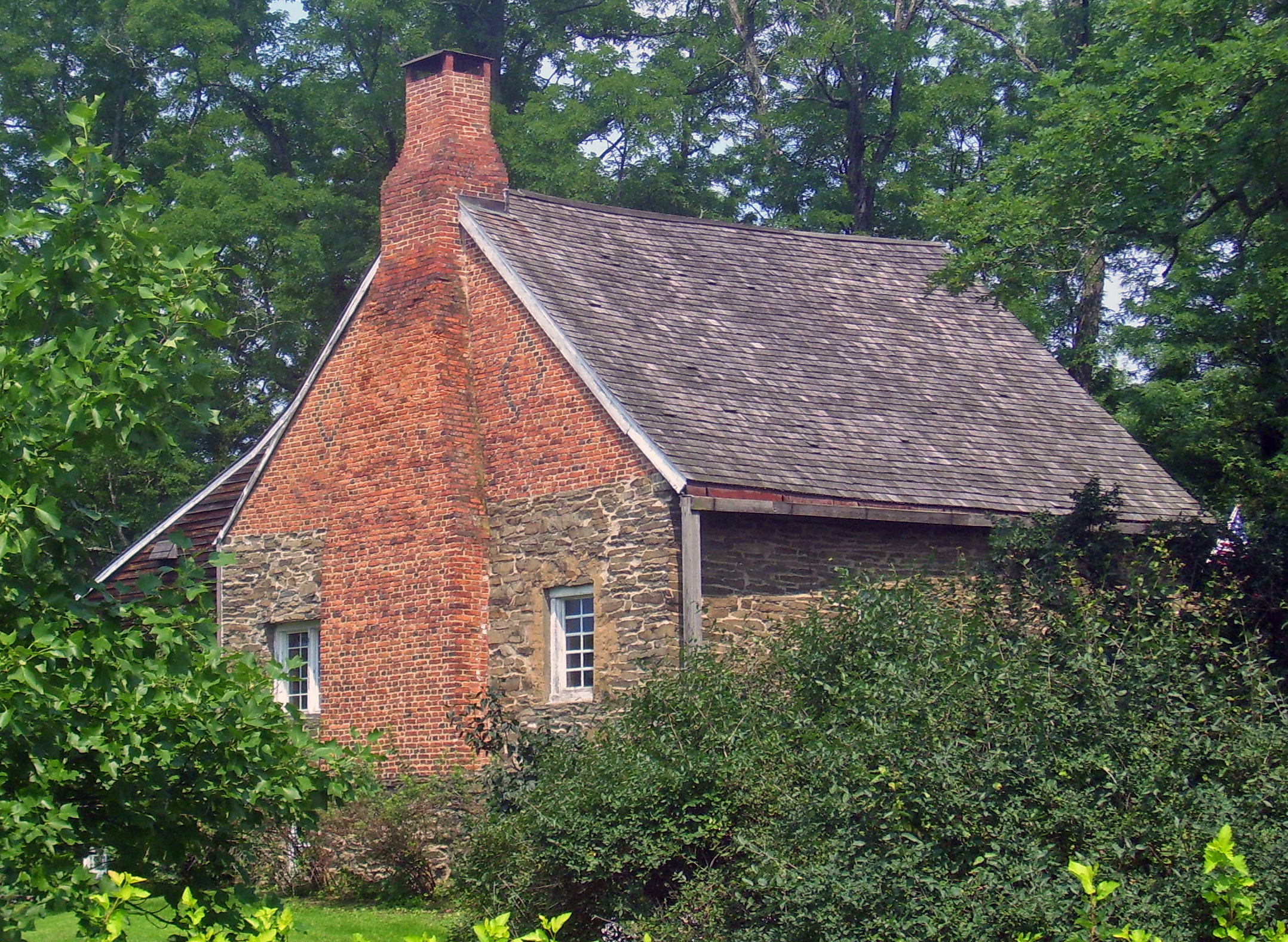
- West profile and south elevation, 2008
- Location: Clermont, NY
- Nearest city: Hudson
- Coordinates: 42°6′13″N 73°53′46″W
- Area: 9.7 acres (3.9 ha)
- Built: 1752
- NRHP reference No.: 78001847
- Added to NRHP: April 20, 1978

The Stone Jug is a historic house at the corner of NY 9G and Jug Road in Clermont, New York, United States. It dates to the mid-18th century and is largely intact, although it has been expanded somewhat since then.

It was built by Konradt Lasher, a Palatine German immigrant to the area who first farmed as a tenant of Robert Livingston. Unusually in an area where brick was the favored material, he chose stone. In the mid-19th century his descendants bought the land and built a farmhouse, now across the street. It, the stone house and several other buildings from the Lasher family farm were listed on the National Register of Historic Places in 1978. Later, in 1992, it became a contributing property to the Hudson River Historic District, a National Historic Landmark.

== Property ==
The house is part of a 9.7-acre (3.9 ha) former farm property on both sides of Route 9G. It includes another farmhouse, a barn, and the remaining foundations of two other stone houses. All are considered contributing properties to its historic character.

The Stone Jug is a 1 1/2-story house consisting of a main block faced mostly in stone with a gabled roof. The west gable end is in brick, as is the chimney that rises from that side. The north wing, added more recently, is of concrete block faced in fieldstone on the east and weatherboard on the north and west.

Original Dutch doors are on both entrances, at the south of the basement and east of the first story. The lintel above the east entrance has the year 1752 and "K.B.L & J." carved into it. The lower one opens into a large room with a 7-foot (2.1 m) hearth built into the west wall. The staircase is original except for the steps. Upstairs, the main room is also mostly intact except for a small entry hall partitioned off to the east. Most of the windows are original except for the double casement on the west wall. On the top is a garret with exposed rafters.

Across Route 9G is a five-bay, 1 1/2-story frame farmhouse. South of Jug Road is an L-shaped frame barn. West of the house on either side of Jug are the remains of two other 18th-century stone houses. A garage on the southeast corner of the intersection is modern and non-contributing.

== History ==
In the early 18th century, several thousand Palatine refugees from the War of Spanish Succession were temporarily housed in London. Britain decided in 1710 to resettle them to the lands of Robert Livingston in the Hudson Valley, lands now making up northwestern Dutchess and southwest Columbia counties. They were to work for Livingston on a scheme to produce naval stores for the crown.

The scheme failed because many of the crops required could not survive the harsh winters of the region. In 1713 Livingston released the Germans, and many settled elsewhere in the area. Their impact can be seen today in placenames like Germantown and Rhinebeck and the many Lutheran churches in the area.

One of them, Bastian Lasher, stayed on the land he had originally settled. He and his three sons were able to work it as tenant farmers, and by 1752 Konradt had built his house near his brothers George and Johannis, using stone rather than the brick more popular with the Palatinate settlers. The family kept the farm, and in 1846 Philip Lasher was able to buy an 85-acre (34 ha) parcel and build the frame farmhouse across the road.

In the 1950s the north wing was added. In the process of doing so the original staircase's steps were replaced with wider ones. There have been no other changes to the house.
