= Bouwerie =

Historic house in New York, United States

- U.S. National Register of Historic Places
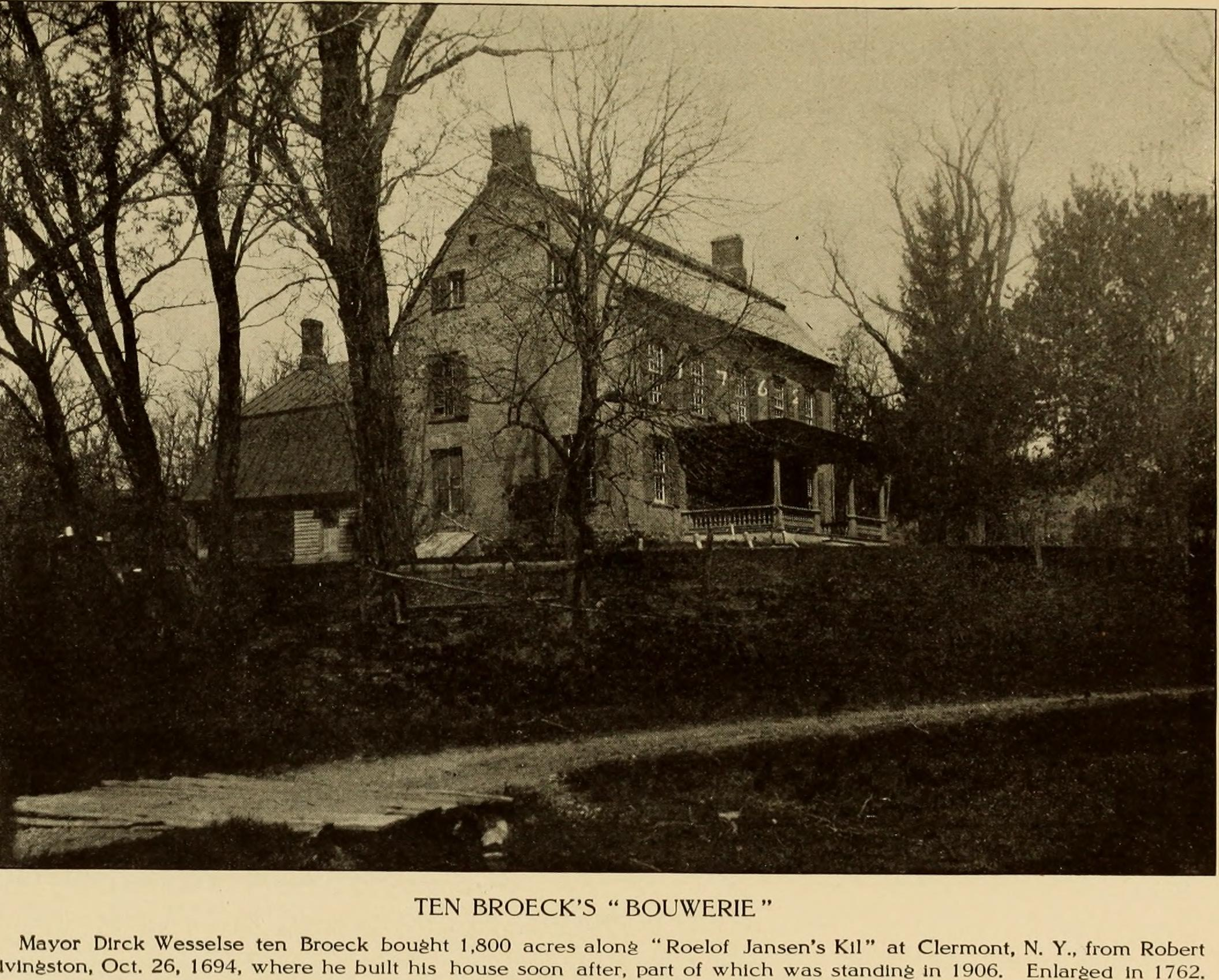

- Location within New York Location within the United States
- Location: Buckwheat Bridge Rd., Clermont, New York
- Coordinates: 42°5′22″N 73°48′46″W
- Area: 60.6 acres (24.5 ha)
- Built: 1762
- Architectural style: Georgian
- MPS: Clermont MRA
- NRHP reference No.: 83003918
- Added to NRHP: October 7, 1983

Bouwerie is a historic home located at Clermont in Columbia County, New York. The house was built in 1762 and is a large, two-story patterned-brick residence with a gambrel roof and rear frame wings. Also on the property are three interconnected barns.

It was added to the National Register of Historic Places in 1983.
