= Coons House =

Historic house in New York, United States

- U.S. National Register of Historic Places
- U.S. National Historic Landmark District – Contributing property
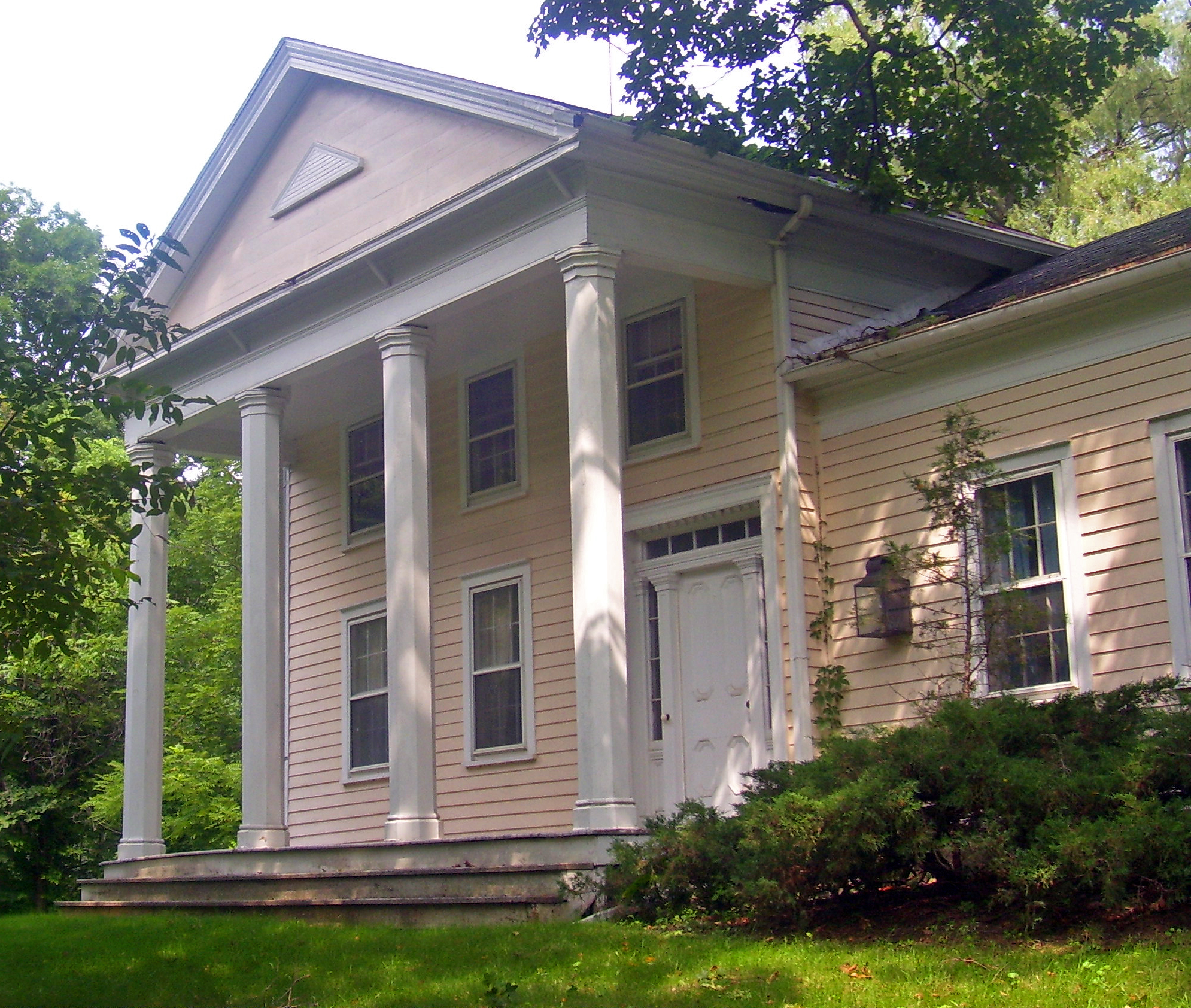
- Partial west elevation, 2008
- Location: Clermont, New York
- Nearest city: Hudson
- Coordinates: 42°05′36″N 73°53′44″W
- Area: 15.5 acres (6.3 ha)
- Built: ca. 1850
- Architectural style: Greek Revival
- MPS: Clermont MRA
- NRHP reference No.: 83003932

The Coons House is located along NY 9G in Clermont, New York, United States, across the road from the Clarkson Chapel. It was built in the mid-19th century in the Greek Revival architectural style.

It is the only Greek Revival house in Clermont to have been built in the full temple style, with a front colonnade. In 1983 it was listed on the National Register of Historic Places, where it is also a contributing property to the Hudson River Historic District, a National Historic Landmark.

== Building ==
The house is at the front of a 15.5-acre (6.3 ha) lot, with trees screening it from the road on its west and a driveway to the north. The neighborhood is rural, with pastures from a nearby horse farm and woodlots.

It is a clapboard-sided frame building two stories high and three bays wide. On the west (front) facade, a two-story portico is supported by four polygonal columns with the entrance on the south. It is flanked by pilasters and topped with a transom light.

A brick chimney rises from the north. On the south end is a one-story gabled wing.

There are two outbuildings on the property. A small shed is behind the house, and a barn is to the south. Both are considered contributing properties to its historic character and Register listing.

== History ==
The building is known to have been erected around 1850. Little is known of its owner or resident at that time. It was on the estates of the Livingston family, and its architectural detail, with a somewhat relaxed application of the Greek Revival style, suggests some prominence for the owner. Its location away from the main buildings of the estate and modest scale make it likely that it was the home of a favored or senior employee of the Livingstons.

== See also ==
- National Register of Historic Places listings in Columbia County, New York
