= Clermont Academy =

Historic school building in New York, US

- U.S. National Register of Historic Places
- U.S. Historic district – Contributing property
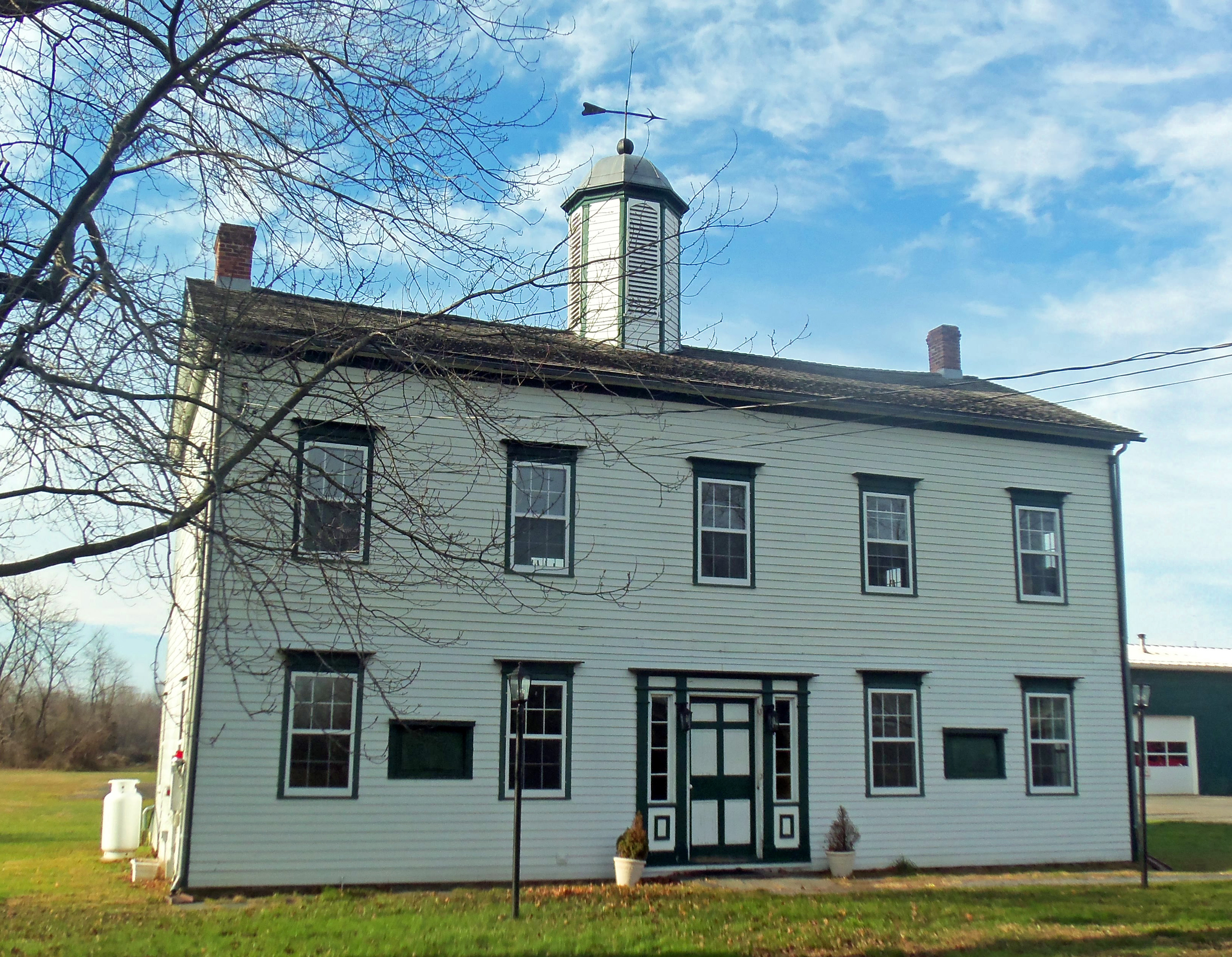
- East elevation, 2012

- Location within New York Location within the United States
- Location: US 9, Clermont, New York
- Coordinates: 42°5′12″N 73°49′34″W
- Area: less than one acre
- Built: 1834
- Architect: Stoats, Philip S.
- Architectural style: Federal
- MPS: Clermont MRA
- NRHP reference No.: 83003931
- Added to NRHP: October 7, 1983

Clermont Academy is a historic school building located at Clermont in Columbia County, New York. It was built in 1834 and is a two-story, five bay frame building in the Federal style. It features a gable roof with centrally located octagonal cupola. It originally functioned as a private secondary school, but became a public school and community center in 1855.

It was added to the National Register of Historic Places in 1983. It is located within the Clermont Civic Historic District, established in 2003.
