= Barringer–Overbaugh–Lasher House =

Historic house in New York, United States

- U.S. National Register of Historic Places
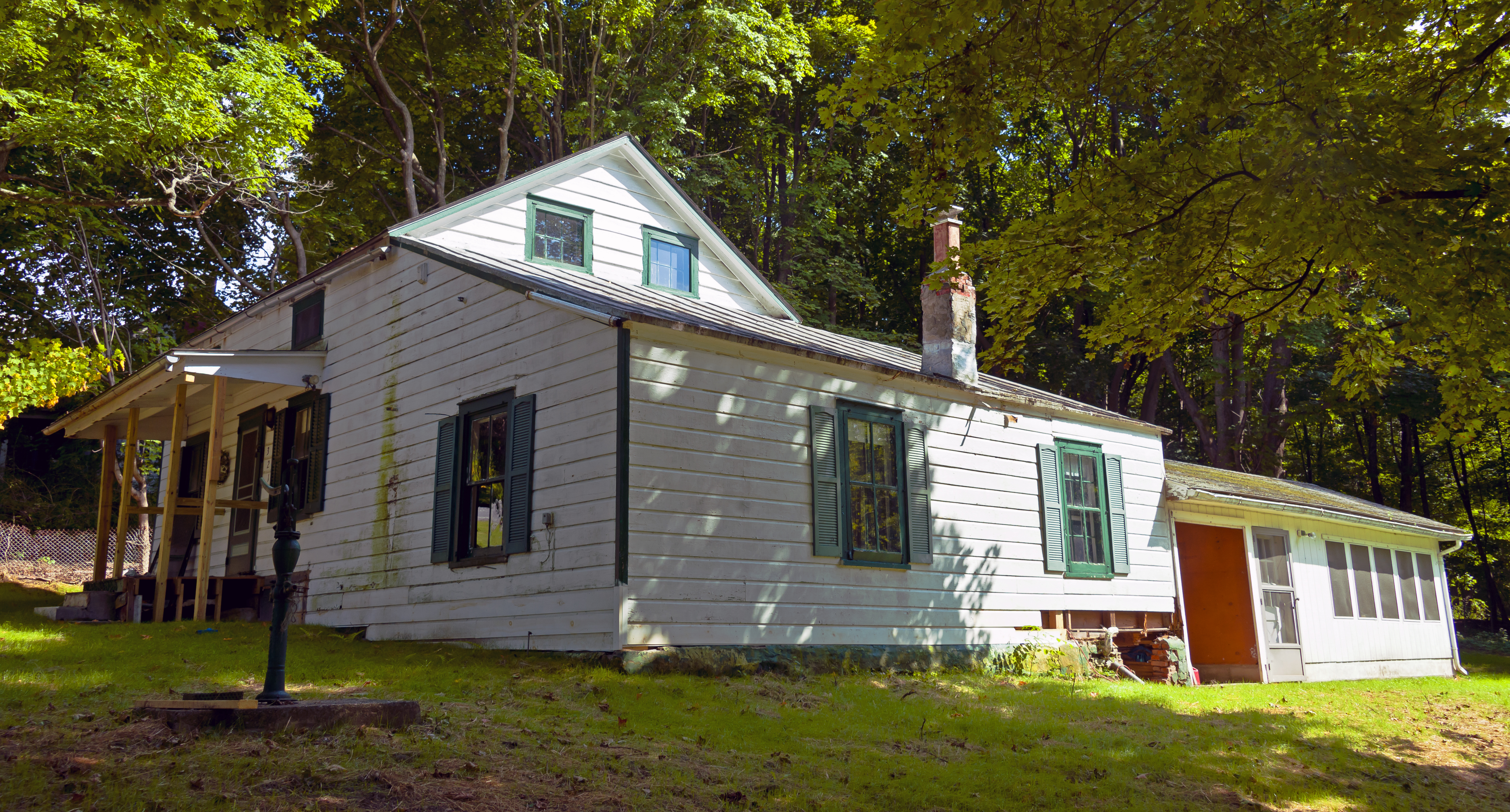
- Barringer-Overbaugh-Lasher House, September 2014

- Location within New York Location within the United States
- Location: 321 Main St., Germantown, New York
- Coordinates: 42°07′57″N 73°52′48″W
- Area: 2.51 acres (1.02 ha)
- Built: c. 1800, c. 1865
- Architectural style: Early Republic, Late Victorian
- NRHP reference No.: 14000980
- Added to NRHP: December 2, 2014

Barringer–Overbaugh–Lasher House is a historic home located at Germantown, Columbia County, New York. The original section was built about 1800, and expanded about 1865. It is a small 1 1/2-story, L-shaped vernacular frame dwelling with a lean-to addition. The front facade features a Late Victorian period porch.

It was added to the National Register of Historic Places in 2014.
