= Clermont, New York =

- Town
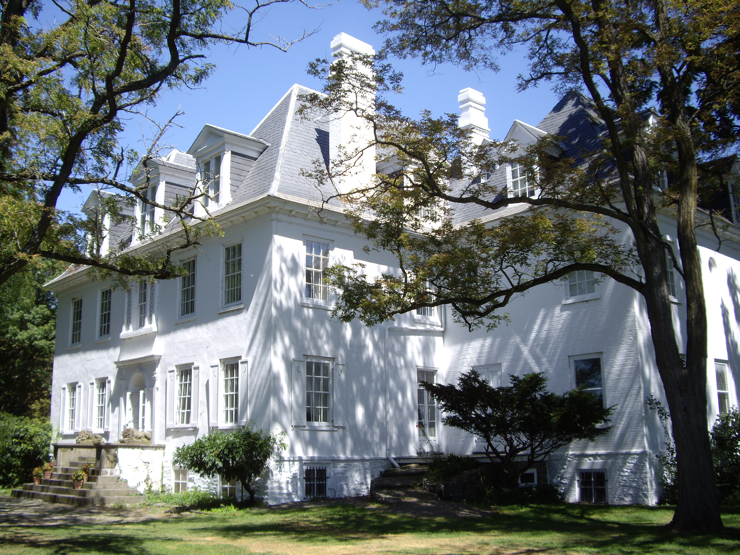
- Clermont Manor

- Location of Clermont, New York
- Coordinates: 42°4′57″N 73°51′9″W
- Country: United States
- State: New York
- County: Columbia

Government
  - Type: Town Council
  - Town Supervisor: Raymond Staats (D)
  - Town Council: Members' List: • Edward Kahle (R); • Evan Hempel (R); • Nancy Moore (D); • Robert Desmond (R)

Area
  - Total: 19.19 sq mi (49.71 km^{2})
  - Land: 18.00 sq mi (46.61 km^{2})
  - Water: 1.20 sq mi (3.10 km^{2})
- Elevation: 194 ft (59 m)

Population (2020)
  - Total: 2,058
  - Density: 114.4/sq mi (44.15/km^{2})
- Time zone: UTC-5 (Eastern (EST))
  - Summer (DST): UTC-4 (EDT)
- ZIP Codes: 12526 (Germantown); 12571 (Red Hook); 12583 (Tivoli)
- Area code: 518
- FIPS code: 36-021-16177
- GNIS feature ID: 0978837
- Website: clermontny.gov

Clermont (/ˈklɛərmɒnt/ KLAIR-mont) is a town in Columbia County, New York, United States. The population was 2,058 at the 2020 census. The name of the town is French for "Clear Mountain", in reference to the mountain views in the town.

The town is in the southwestern corner of Columbia County, south of the city of Hudson.

== History ==
"Clermont" was originally one of the oldest of the great estates of the mid-Hudson valley. The Clermont Manor was established in 1728, in what is now the town of Clermont. The manor was originally part of the 160,000-acre (650 km^{2}) Livingston Manor; Clermont was a 13,000-acre (53 km^{2}) section in the southwest corner that was bequeathed to Robert Livingston, a younger son. His descendants would come to own more than 500,000 acres (2,000 km^{2}) in the Catskill Mountains and more than 100,000 acres (400 km^{2}) in Dutchess County.

Clermont marked the northernmost penetration by British troops up the Hudson River during the American Revolution; Livingston's home was burned because of his prominent role in the Revolution. It was rebuilt between 1779 and 1782. The house is now a 500-acre (2.0 km^{2}) New York State Historic Site and a National Historic Landmark.

In 1788, Clermont Manor was organized as the town of Clermont.

Clermont was the port of registry of Robert Fulton's first steamboat, co-owned by Livingston, which was called the North River. Today it is known as the Clermont. The ruins of its dock on the Hudson River can still be found at the historic site.

The estate, and later the town, was home to seven generations of the Livingston family until 1962.

The Bouwerie, Thomas Brodhead House, Clarkson Chapel, Clermont Academy, Clermont Civic Historic District, Coons House, Hickory Hill, Old Parsonagee, Sixteen Mile District, and St. Luke's Church are listed on the National Register of Historic Places.

== Geography ==
According to the United States Census Bureau, the town has a total area of 19.2 square miles (49.7 km^{2}), of which 18.0 square miles (46.6 km^{2}) is land and 1.2 square miles (3.1 km^{2}), or 6.23%, is water.

The southern town line is the border of Dutchess County, and part of the western town boundary, marked by the Hudson River, is the border of Ulster County. The northeastern border of the town follows the Roeliff Jansen Kill, a tributary of the Hudson River. The border formed by the kill is, for much of its length, quite close to the town's southern border; then is its border with the town of Germantown to the west, resulting in long, narrow extensions of the town to the southeast and north.

== Demographics ==
Historical population
Census	Pop.	Note	%±
1820	1,164		—
1830	1,203		3.4%
1840	1,231		2.3%
1850	1,130		−8.2%
1860	968		−14.3%
1870	1,021		5.5%
1880	918		−10.1%
1890	798		−13.1%
1900	812		1.8%
1910	800		−1.5%
1920	667		−16.6%
1930	805		20.7%
1940	806		0.1%
1950	898		11.4%
1960	980		9.1%
1970	1,120		14.3%
1980	1,269		13.3%
1990	1,443		13.7%
2000	1,732		20.0%
2010	1,965		13.5%
2020	2,058		4.7%
U.S. Decennial Census

As of the census of 2000, there were 1,726 people, 593 households, and 437 families residing in the town. The population density was 96.0 inhabitants per square mile (37.1/km^{2}). There were 725 housing units at an average density of 40.3 per square mile (15.6/km^{2}). The racial makeup of the town was 96.58% White, 1.27% African American, 0.23% Native American, 0.35% Asian, 0.52% from other races, and 1.04% from two or more races. Hispanic or Latino of any race were 2.72% of the population.

There were 593 households, out of which 36.9% had children under the age of 18 living with them, 57.3% were married couples living together, 11.8% had a female householder with no husband present, and 26.3% were non-families. 21.4% of all households were made up of individuals, and 9.1% had someone living alone who was 65 years of age or older. The average household size was 2.85 and the average family size was 3.33.

In the town, the population was spread out, with 30.3% under the age of 18, 7.2% from 18 to 24, 27.8% from 25 to 44, 22.9% from 45 to 64, and 11.8% who were 65 years of age or older. The median age was 36 years. For every 100 females, there were 96.4 males. For every 100 females age 18 and over, there were 91.0 males.

The median income for a household in the town was $47,039, and the median income for a family was $51,012. Males had a median income of $35,526 versus $26,250 for females. The per capita income for the town was $21,566. About 6.4% of families and 9.4% of the population were below the poverty line, including 8.7% of those under age 18 and 8.5% of those age 65 or over.

== Communities and locations in Clermont ==
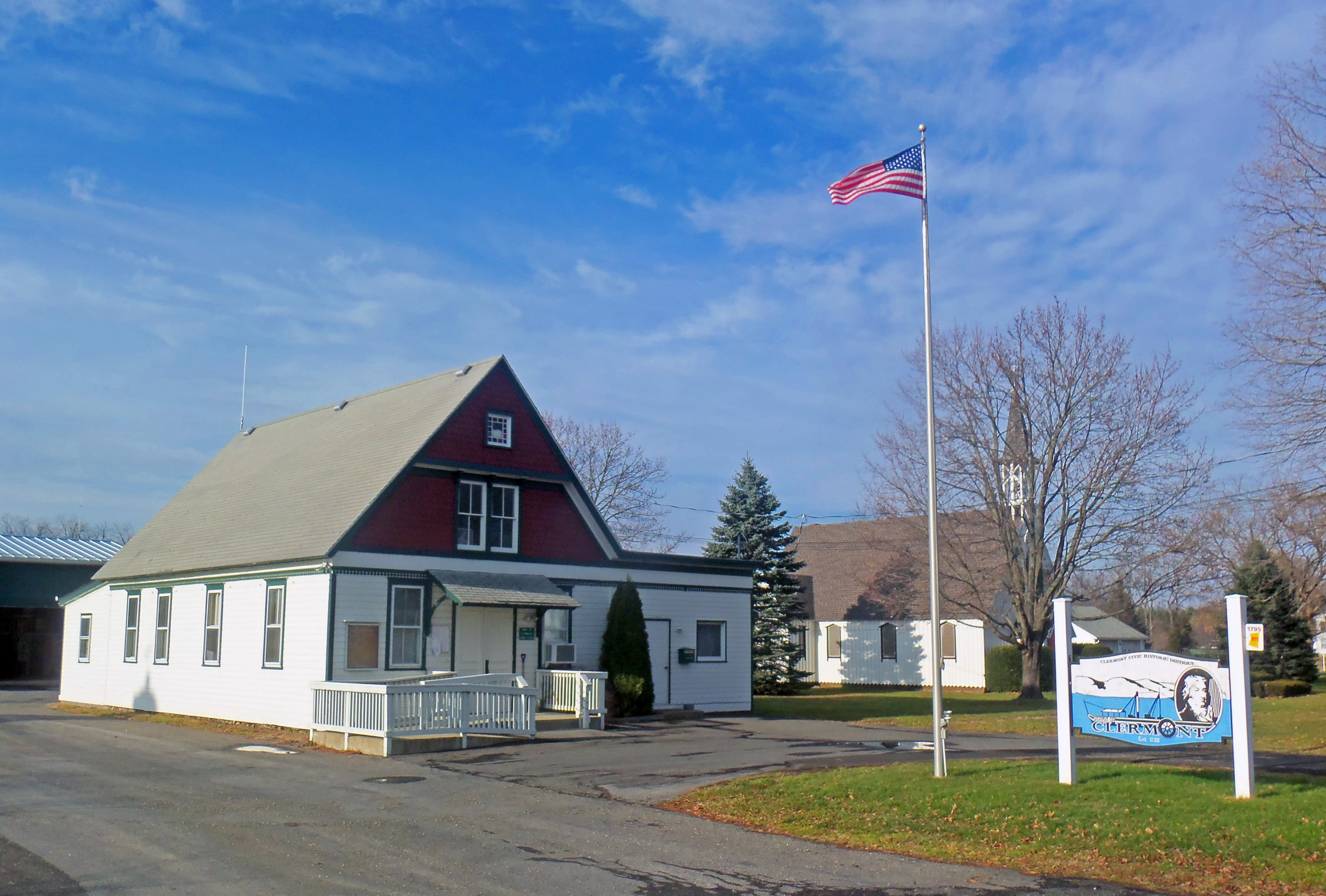
Clermont town hall

- Clermont – The hamlet of Clermont in the northeastern part of the town.
- Clermont State Historic Site – A state and national historic site at the Hudson River, comprising the core of Clermont Manor.
- Cross Hill – A hamlet in the western part of town, east of the state historic site.
- Elizaville – A hamlet in the southeastern corner of the town.
- Nevis – A hamlet south of Clermont on Route 9.
- Viewmont – A hamlet on the northern town line, north of Cross Hill.

== Callendar House, Clermont ==
"Callendar House" was built on a bluff overlooking the river in 1794 by Henry Gilbert Livingston (1758–1817), whose country seat was next door. He was the great-grandson of Robert Livingston the Elder through his grandfather Gilbert. In 1795 he sold it to his cousin Philip Henry Livingston (1769–1831), great-grandson of Gilbert's older brother Philip Livingston (1686–1749), the second Lord of Livingston Manor. Philip and his wife called it "Sunning Hill" and occupied it until 1828, when it was purchased by Robert L. Tillotson. In 1835, Tillotson sold the property to architect Richard T. Auchmuty.

William E. Toler acquired the premises in 1854; and then Jacob R. LeRoy, son of Herman Leroy, who founded Le Roy, Bayard & Co. Jacob's sister, Caroline LeRoy married Daniel Webster. Jacob LeRoy gave "Sunning Hill" to his daughter Charlotte, the wife of Rev. Henry De Koven. De Koven had served at St. Paul's Episcopal Church in Tivoli; he founded and was first rector of Christ Church in Red Hook.

In 1860 it became the property of Johnston Livingston, and then that of his son-in-law, Geraldwyn Redmond. Livingston was on the boards of both Wells Fargo and American Express. "Callendar House" is the name of a former Livingston mansion in Fallkirk, Scotland. It was one of the names Robert Livingston had considered for the Lower Manor, but family members objected that it was a prerogative of the head of the family, and so he chose Clermont instead.

It later came into the possession of Jean de Castella, who raised thoroughbred race horses there. Castella renamed it "Tivoli".

The property included thirty-five acres. The house has a Federal-style core. A hall bisects the downstairs from front to back. In 1828 one-story wings were added, and around 1830, a veranda. In 1910, a living room was added to the first floor by McKim Mead & White, as well as a south wing. The murals were painted in 1921 by Olin Dows.
