= Simeon Rockefeller House =

Historic house in New York, United States

- U.S. National Register of Historic Places
- Location within New York Location within the United States
- Nearest city: Germantown, New York
- Coordinates: 42°07′52″N 73°51′50″W
- Area: 6 acres (2.4 ha)
- Built: 1755
- Architectural style: Colonial, Federal
- NRHP reference No.: 09000479
- Added to NRHP: May 21, 2009

The Simeon Rockefeller House, also known as Rockefeller Tavern, is a historic house located in Germantown, New York.

The beginnings of the noted family in American history can be traced to this historic home. As indicated on the historical marker placed by the State of New York, it was the home Simeon or Simon Rockefeller (1730–1795), son of the immigrant Diell Rockefeller. This family originated among the Palatine Germans who immigrated to Columbia County seeking religious freedom. Descendants include John D. Rockefeller who was known to have visited the site. It was added to the National Register of Historic Places in 2009. While it is now undergoing restoration as a private residence, it was originally a stage stop, tavern, and restaurant. In addition, the early settlers engaged in farming. It is a plain structure with colonnades on a double porch. It is built with fieldstone and as was typical, had a basement kitchen.

The house was in poor condition and had had many unsympathetic alterations when it was bought by Mary Black and Michael J. Gladstone. The two friends restored the building and used it as separate but conjoined residences; the central hall was agreed upon as the dividing line, and both agreed to give the other veto power over any exterior alterations.
