= Thomas Brodhead House =

Historic house in New York, United States

- U.S. National Register of Historic Places
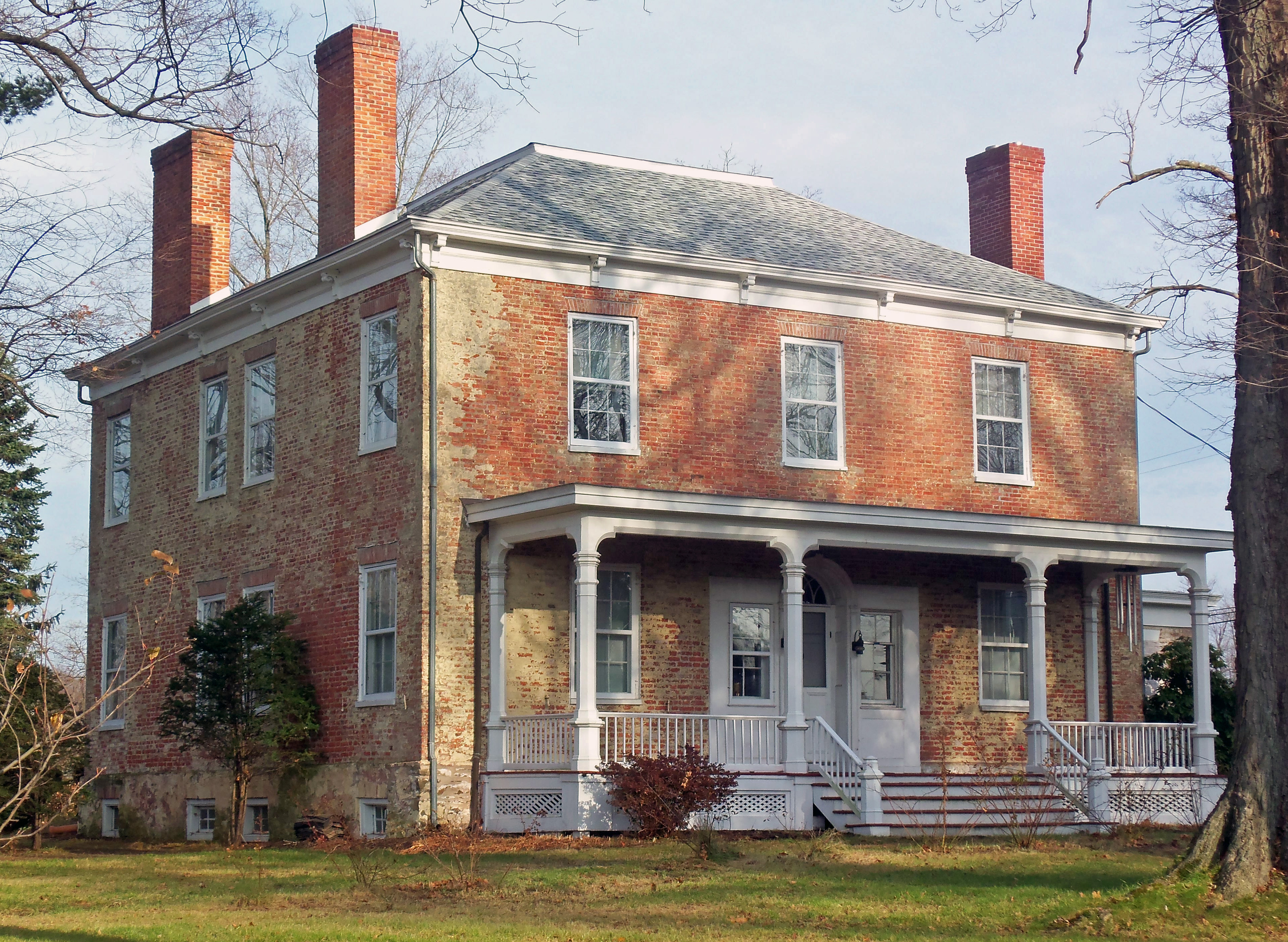
- West profile and south elevation, 2012

- Location within New York Location within the United States
- Location: US 9, Clermont, New York
- Coordinates: 42°5′24″N 73°49′21″W
- Area: 1.8 acres (0.73 ha)
- Built: 1795
- Architectural style: Federal
- MPS: Clermont MRA
- NRHP reference No.: 83003919
- Added to NRHP: October 7, 1983

Thomas Brodhead House, also known as The Brick House, is a historic home located at Clermont in Columbia County, New York. The house was built about 1795 and is a two-story, three bay Federal style brick residence with a hipped roof. Also on the property is a brick smoke house.

It was added to the National Register of Historic Places in 1983.
