= Germantown (CDP), New York =

Germantown, New York
- Census-designated place
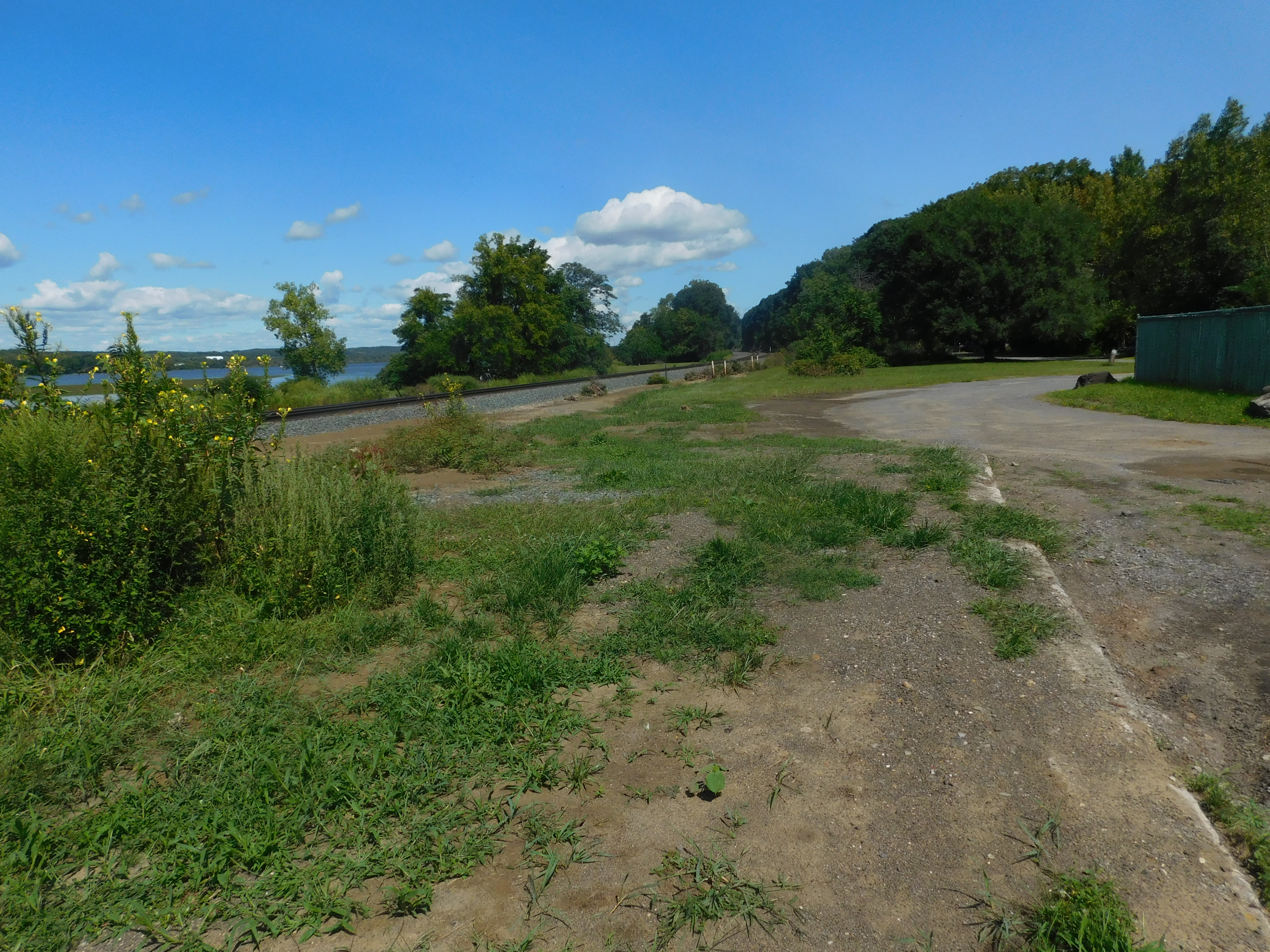
- The site of the former Germantown New York Central Railroad station in August 2026. The station foundation is in the foreground.

- Location within the state of New York
- Coordinates: 42°8′9″N 73°53′16″W
- Country: United States
- State: New York
- County: Columbia
- Town: Germantown

Area
  - Total: 3.66 sq mi (9.48 km^{2})
  - Land: 3.64 sq mi (9.44 km^{2})
  - Water: 0.015 sq mi (0.04 km^{2})
- Elevation: 135 ft (41 m)

Population (2020)
  - Total: 1,121
  - Density: 307.6/sq mi (118.75/km^{2})
- Time zone: UTC-5 (Eastern (EST))
  - Summer (DST): UTC-4 (EDT)
- ZIP code: 12526
- Area code: 518
- FIPS code: 36-28761
- GNIS feature ID: 0951036

Germantown is a census-designated place (CDP) in the town of Germantown in Columbia County, New York, United States, on the east side of the Hudson River. The population of the CDP was 1,121 at the 2020 census, out of a total town population of 1,936.

== Geography ==
Germantown is located at 42°8′9″N 73°53′16″W (42.135865, -73.887886). The CDP includes all of the hamlet of Germantown but also extends north as far as North Germantown and south to include most of the hamlet of Cheviot. The CDP is bordered to the west by the Hudson River; to the north by Anchorage Road, Northern Boulevard, and Camp Creek Road; to the east by Hover Avenue and Church Avenue; and to the south by Roundtop Road and Cheviot Road.

New York State Route 9G passes through Germantown, leading north 10 miles (16 km) to Hudson and south 9 miles (14 km) to Annandale-on-Hudson.

According to the United States Census Bureau, the Germantown CDP has a total area of 2.7 square miles (7.0 km^{2}), of which 0.015 square miles (0.04 km^{2}), or 0.59%, is water.

== Demographics ==
Historical population
Census	Pop.	Note	%±
2020	1,121		—
U.S. Decennial Census

As of the census of 2000, there were 862 people, 351 households, and 236 families residing in the CDP. The population density was 322.3 inhabitants per square mile (124.4/km^{2}). There were 408 housing units at an average density of 152.6 per square mile (58.9/km^{2}). The racial makeup of the CDP was 96.40% White, 0.93% Black or African American, 0.23% Native American, 0.58% Asian, 0.58% from other races, and 1.28% from two or more races. Hispanic or Latino of any race were 1.74% of the population.

There were 351 households, out of which 29.6% had children under the age of 18 living with them, 55.0% were married couples living together, 9.4% had a female householder with no husband present, and 32.5% were non-families. 25.6% of all households were made up of individuals, and 9.4% had someone living alone who was 65 years of age or older. The average household size was 2.44 and the average family size was 2.93.

In the CDP, the population was spread out, with 23.5% under the age of 18, 7.5% from 18 to 24, 28.3% from 25 to 44, 26.7% from 45 to 64, and 13.9% who were 65 years of age or older. The median age was 40 years. For every 100 females, there were 89.5 males. For every 100 females age 18 and over, there were 89.9 males.

The median income for a household in the CDP was $44,141, and the median income for a family was $51,875. Males had a median income of $40,395 versus $25,563 for females. The per capita income for the CDP was $22,015. About 3.2% of families and 7.2% of the population were below the poverty line, including 9.5% of those under age 18 and 7.3% of those age 65 or over.
