= Germantown, New York =

- Town
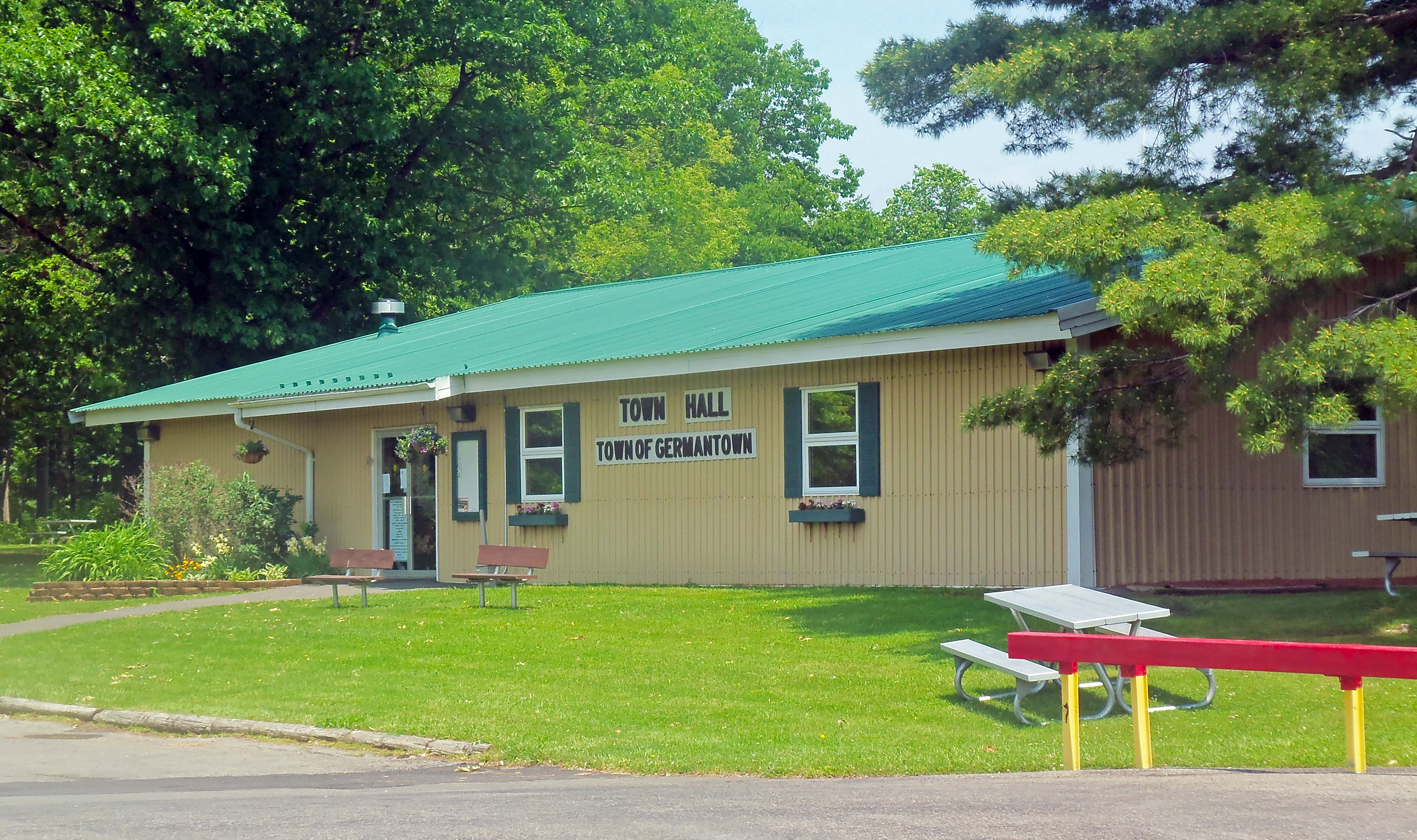
- Town hall, 2013

- Location in New York
- Coordinates: 42°08′03″N 73°52′16″W
- Country: United States
- State: (New York (state)) New York
- County: Columbia
- Established: 1788

Government
  - Type: Town Council
  - Town Supervisor: David Helsley Sr.
  - Town Council: Members' List: • Joan Snyder (R); • Joel Craig (D); • Jerry Smith (D); • Graceann Lamberta (R)

Area
  - Total: 13.9 sq mi (36.1 km^{2})
  - Land: 12.1 sq mi (31.3 km^{2})
  - Water: 1.8 sq mi (4.7 km^{2})
- Elevation: 249 ft (76 m)

Population (2020)
  - Total: 1,936
  - Density: 160/sq mi (61.9/km^{2})
- Time zone: UTC-5 (Eastern (EST))
  - Summer (DST): UTC-4 (EDT)
- ZIP Code: 12526
- Area code: 518
- FIPS code: 36-28772
- GNIS feature ID: 0978998
- Website: germantownny.gov

Germantown is a town in Columbia County, New York, United States. The population was 1,936 at the 2020 census, down slightly from 1,954 in 2010. Germantown is located in the south-western part of the county along the east side of the Hudson River.

== History ==
=== Early indigenous history ===
The area currently known as Germantown was originally occupied by the Mohican people. In the early eighteenth century, Hendrick Aupaumut recorded the movement of his people who had settled along the rivers that would later be named the Delaware and Hudson. Those who had continued north settled in the valley of the river they named the Mahicannituck (today's Hudson River), meaning 'the Waters That Are Never Still'. They named themselves the 'Muh-he-con-neok' after the river, a name that eventually evolved to the present day Mohican or Mahican.

The Mohicans settled in the valley, building wigwams and longhouses. The river and woodlands were abundant with life and food, which they supplemented with the corn, beans, and squash they grew. Mohican women were usually in charge of this agriculture, along with the homes and children, while men traveled to fish, hunt, or serve as warriors.

=== Colonization and European-Mohican relations ===
In September 1609, Henry Hudson, a trader for the Dutch, sailed up the Mahicannituck. The valley was rich with beavers and otters, whose fur the Dutch coveted, and in 1614 a trading post was established. As the fur trade expanded, making desired furs harder to find, tensions arose between the Mohicans and the Mohawk, who each sought to maintain their share in the fur trade and relations with European allies. Wars and their effects contributed to the loss of Mohican land to the point where territory in the Hudson Valley dwindled almost completely by the end of the seventeenth century. Mohicans were especially affected by European wars such as King Philip’s War where soldiers from Massachusetts and Connecticut attacked Mohicans. In general after war, Mohicans sold land to the Dutch in exchange for needed resources lost in the destruction of indigenous farming and preserved resources. As more and more Europeans arrived and settled on the land, the Mohicans’ self-reliance and reliance on the land was eroded by increased dependency on the settlers and their provisions. Settlers began dividing the land, establishing fences and boundary lines. Eventually, the Mohicans were driven from their territory west of the Mahicannituck and continued to move further east in the early 1700s.

Robert Livingston, a Scottish immigrant, bought thousands of acres from the Native Americans. In 1683, Mohicans sold the first land parcel along the Roeliff Jansen Kill to Livingston in exchange for goods as well as rights to hunting and fishing in the area. Livingston received a Mohican deed to the Tachkanick settlement in 1685, where he built a house in 1689. These exchanges were the beginning of a trade relationship that lasted through 1768. He owned a total of 160,240 acres (64,850 ha) at what became Livingston Manor.

=== Moravian-Mohican relations ===
In the summer of 1740, the first Moravian mission was established in the Mohican village of Shekomeko. Before that, Moravian missionary Christian Henry Rauch approached two Mohican leaders, Maumauntissekun (AKA Shabash) and Wassamapah, who were sojourning in New York City. Rauch wanted them to help bring Christianity to Mohican settlements. Maumauntissekun had a vision in 1739 where he and his Indian brethren laid dead in the woods. Because they suffered from alcoholism, he believed in the need for religion and temperance. Maumauntissekun agreed to bring Rauch to his town, Shekomeko. Initially, many Mohicans were skeptical of Rauch's presence because Mohican land had been bought in such great quantities by Europeans. Nevertheless, Maumauntissekun was among the first three Shekomeko residents to be baptized on February 11, 1742. Maumauntissekun then became known as Abraham of Shekomeko.

The Moravians lived among Mohicans in Dutchess County and Connecticut's Housatonic Valley. Many Moravians missionaries learned Mohican languages, while often in areas of strong English and German influence, they did not. Children of Mohican converts learned to read and write in Moravian schools. By the mid-eighteenth century, much of Mohican territory was divided by colonial powers, with the private property of others having displaced traditional communal lands. Although many Mohicans were divided on the new way of life, some adapted to it by converting to Christianity. Families often sent their children to be baptized and raised at Moravian headquarters in Bethlehem, Pennsylvania, due to the high mortality rates of children from European diseases and war.

In the 1740s, there were regional Indian raids on European settlements in New York and Massachusetts. Settlers believed that the French in Canada supplied Indians with weapons. Moravian missionaries were perceived as both allies of Canada and Indians, and were accused of disloyalty for fomenting the uprisings. When Moravian missionaries refused to enter colonial militias in early 1744, the New York colonial government issued a September 1744 order that discontinued Moravian missionary activities in the province.

=== Mohican-settler land disputes ===
In the 1720s, white settlers began to survey Dutchess County land that they claimed according to exchanges originating from the Great Nine Partners Patent. The latter was a landholding of between 8 and 10 miles in width from east of the Hudson almost to Connecticut at the Oblong. It was granted to white settlers in May 1697 and the result of negotiations with Indians in eight grants from the Little Nine Partners Patent signed in April 1706.

Abraham of Shekomeko (formerly known as Maumauntissekun or Shabash) protested the claims but was still willing to sell some land. His grievance was based on Mohican tradition which provides that land that was not used is open for his people to continue hunting and fishing in the area. The Dutchess County territory being surveyed was unoccupied by white settlers for over four decades, making European claims de jure. The Mohicans, on the other hand, had been hunting and farming on the land for over two decades. According to a missionary memorandum recorded in 1743, Abraham went to New York City in 1724 where the governor promised to pay for Mohican land and leave them with a square mile for Mohican settlement. In September 1743 that square mile was divided by white settlers. In response, Abraham wrote to the governor disputing the unlawful claims. He tried to prove Mohican ownership by producing witnesses to the Little Nine Partners and even sent a petition around Shekomeko. In the end, the land was divided, and Abraham moved from the village site while Shekomeko was claimed by a proprietor.

=== Founding of Germantown ===
In 1710, Robert Livingston sold 6,000 acres (2,400 ha) of his property to Anne, Queen of Great Britain, for use as work camps and resettlement of Palatine German refugees. Some 1,200 persons were settled at work camps to manufacture naval stores and pay off their passage as indentured labor. Known as "East Camp", the colony had four villages: Hunterstown, Queensbury, Annsbury, and Haysbury. The area was later renamed "Germantown". In 1775 Germantown was formed as a "district". Germantown was one of the seven original towns of Columbia County established by an act passed March 7, 1788, alongside Kinderhook, Canaan, Claverack, Hillsdale, Clermont, and Livingston.

In March 1845, a boat-load of people from East Camp, who had been to Hudson to make purchases, was run over first by a scow, and then by the steamboat South America. All nine individuals were lost.

=== Removal ===
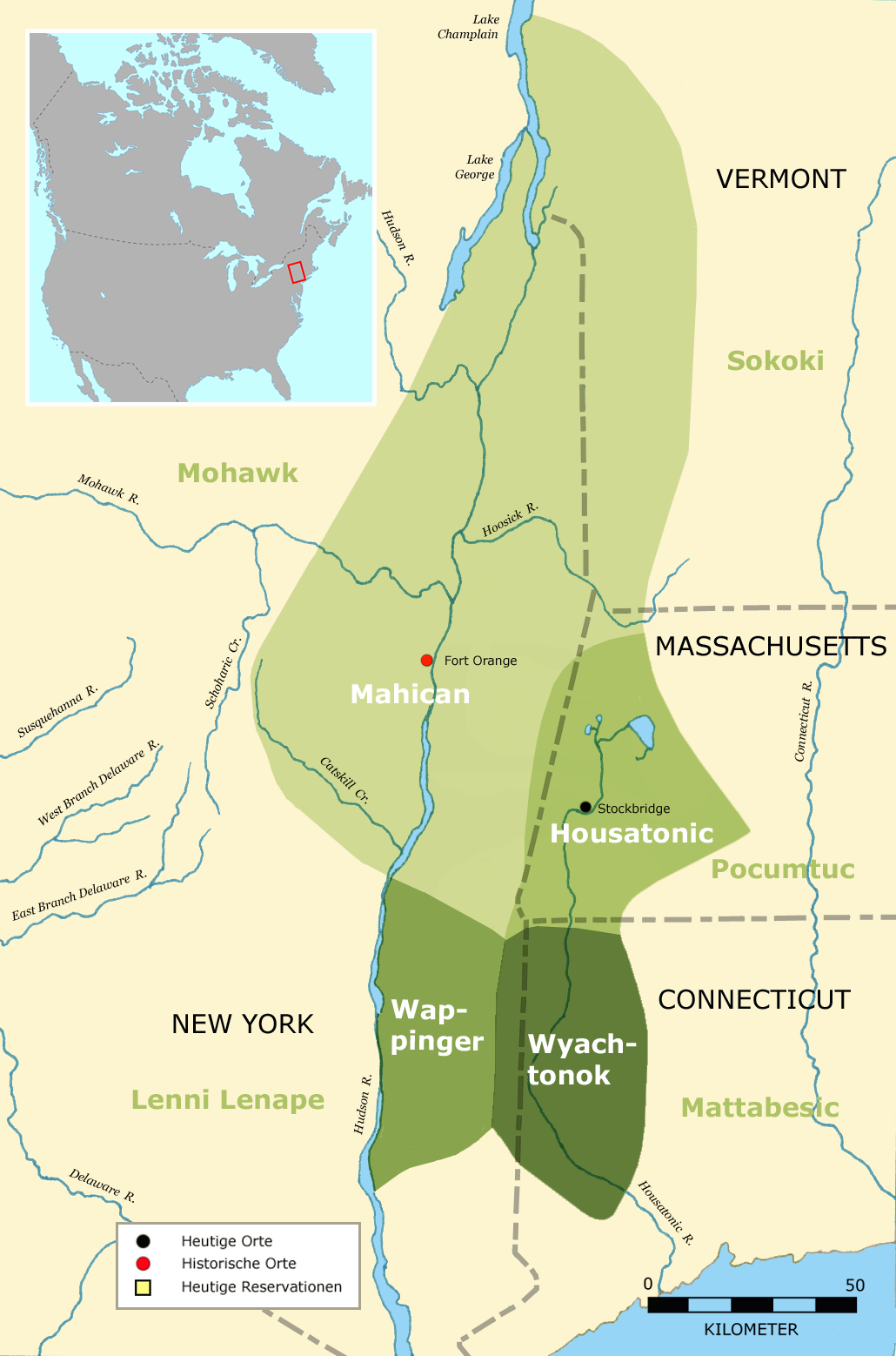
Traditional Mohican, Housatonic, Wappinger, and Wawyachtonoc territory at one point within the area currently known as the Hudson River Valley

During the American Revolution, the Mohicans supported the colonists. After the war concluded, however, they were not welcomed in the area's villages. The Oneida offered them a portion of land and in the mid-1780s they began to move to the prayer town of New Stockbridge. Although the community thrived and the population grew steadily, land companies, hoping to make a profit from the land inhabited by Indigenous communities, proposed that New York State remove all Native Americans from within its borders. In 1822 agents from New York, missionaries, and commissioners from the War Department negotiated with the Menominee and Ho-Chunk communities of Wisconsin for a tract of land on which to relocate the indigenous tribes of New York. In the following years, members of the community were relocated to Shawano County, Wisconsin, and settled on the reservation land. The modern Stockbridge-Munsee Community comprises the descendants of these and other bands and tribes relocated people.

== Geography ==
According to the United States Census Bureau, the town has a total area of 13.9 square miles (36.1 km^{2}), of which 12.1 square miles (31.3 km^{2}) is land and 1.8 square miles (4.7 km^{2}), or 13.07%, is water. The western town line, marking the center of the Hudson River, is the border of Greene and Ulster counties.

== Demographics ==
Historical population
Census	Pop.	Note	%±
1820	891		—
1830	967		8.5%
1840	969		0.2%
1850	1,023		5.6%
1860	1,353		32.3%
1870	1,393		3.0%
1880	1,608		15.4%
1890	1,683		4.7%
1900	1,686		0.2%
1910	1,649		−2.2%
1920	1,424		−13.6%
1930	1,462		2.7%
1940	1,427		−2.4%
1950	1,418		−0.6%
1960	1,504		6.1%
1970	1,782		18.5%
1980	1,922		7.9%
1990	2,010		4.6%
2000	2,018		0.4%
2010	1,954		−3.2%
2020	1,936		−0.9%
U.S. Decennial Census

As of the census of 2000, there were 2,018 people, 831 households, and 546 families residing in the town. The population density was 166.0 inhabitants per square mile (64.1/km^{2}). There were 984 housing units at an average density of 81.0 per square mile (31.3/km^{2}). The racial makeup of the town was 96.93% White, 1.14% Black or African American, 0.15% Native American, 0.45% Asian, 0.40% from other races, and 0.94% from two or more races. Hispanic or Latino of any race were 1.29% of the population.

There were 831 households, out of which 28.3% had children under the age of 18 living with them, 53.7% were married couples living together, 7.5% had a female householder with no husband present, and 34.2% were non-families. 28.8% of all households were made up of individuals, and 14.0% had someone living alone who was 65 years of age or older. The average household size was 2.41 and the average family size was 2.95.

In the town, the population was spread out, with 23.1% under the age of 18, 6.0% from 18 to 24, 27.1% from 25 to 44, 25.8% from 45 to 64, and 18.1% who were 65 years of age or older. The median age was 42 years. For every 100 females, there were 94.4 males. For every 100 females age 18 and over, there were 95.5 males.

The median income for a household in the town was $42,195, and the median income for a family was $50,885. Males had a median income of $36,806 versus $26,250 for females. The per capita income for the town was $22,198. About 5.0% of families and 7.9% of the population were below the poverty line, including 9.3% of those under age 18 and 5.7% of those age 65 or over.

== Points of interest ==
=== Germantown Library ===
The Germantown library was first founded in 1948 by the Germantown Garden Club and Emily Finger Lappe. It was originally located in the town hall across from the current post office and was run by volunteers for two years.

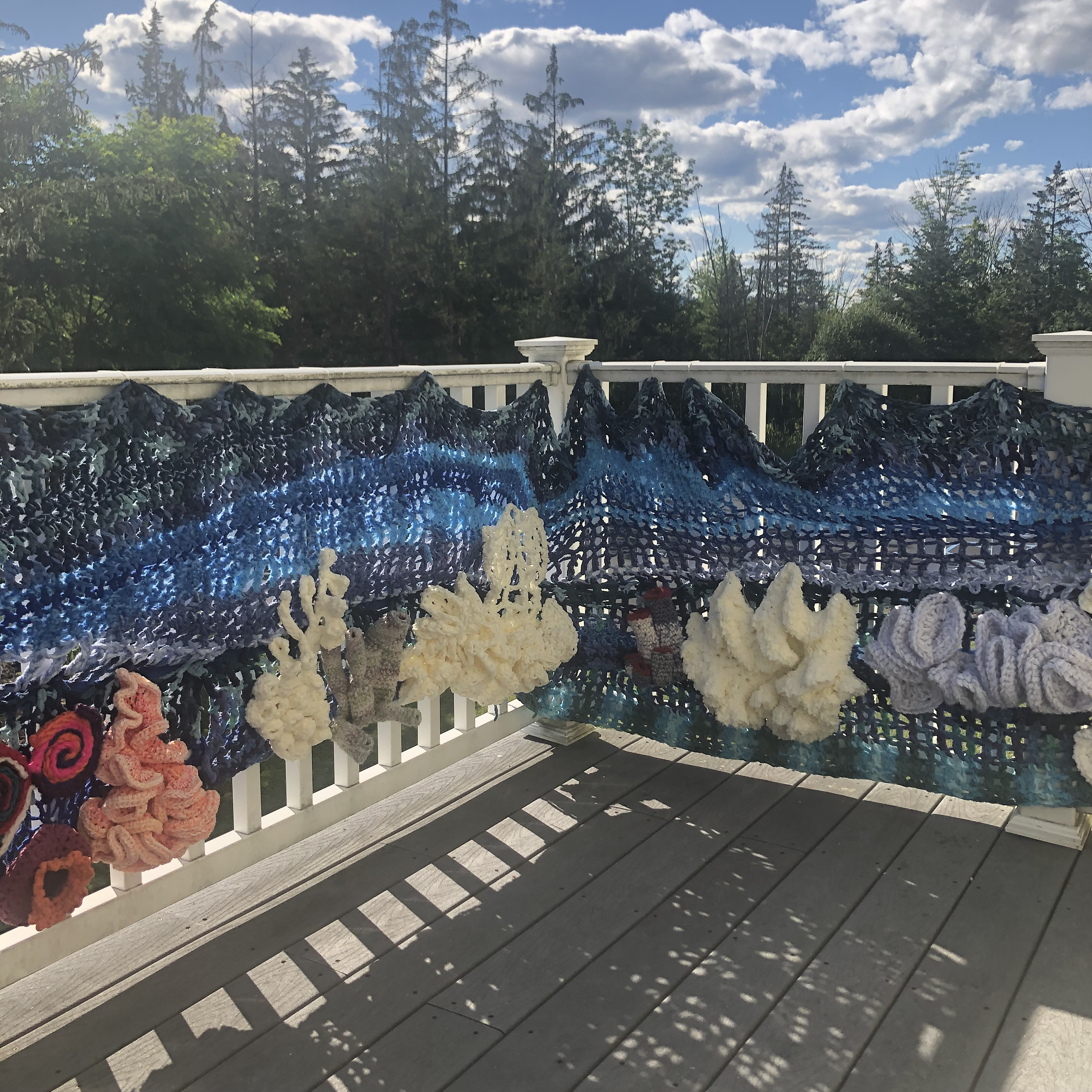
The Germantown library's summer 2021 yarn storming focused on the importance of coral reefs to the planet's ecosystem.

=== National Register of Historic Properties listings ===
The Barringer–Overbaugh–Lasher House, Clermont State Historic Site, Clermont Estates Historic District, Charles H. Coons Farm, Dick House, German Reformed Sanctity Church Parsonage, Hudson River Heritage Historic District, Stone Jug, and Simeon Rockefeller House are listed on the National Register of Historic Places.

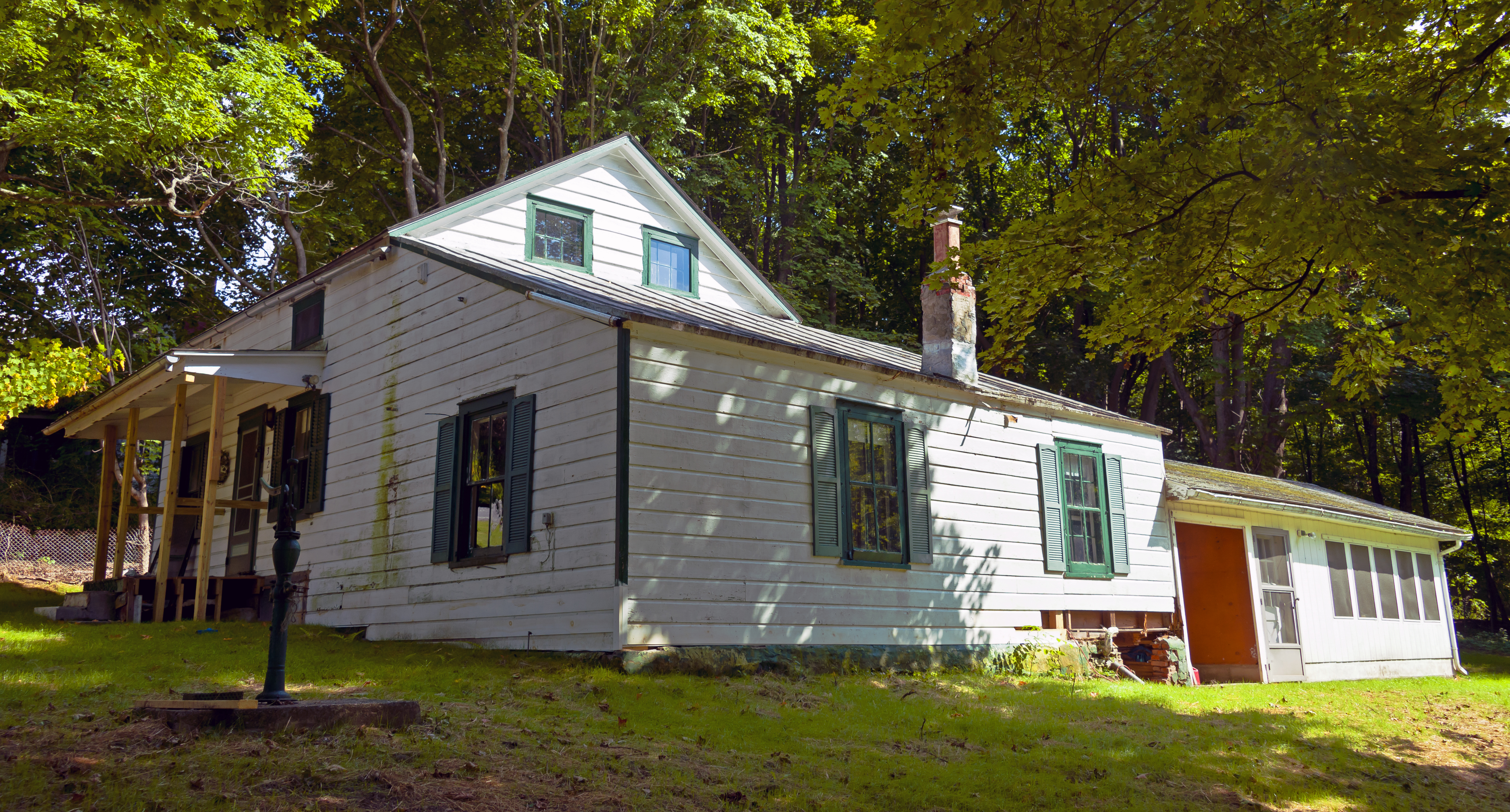
Barringer-Overbaugh-Lasher House

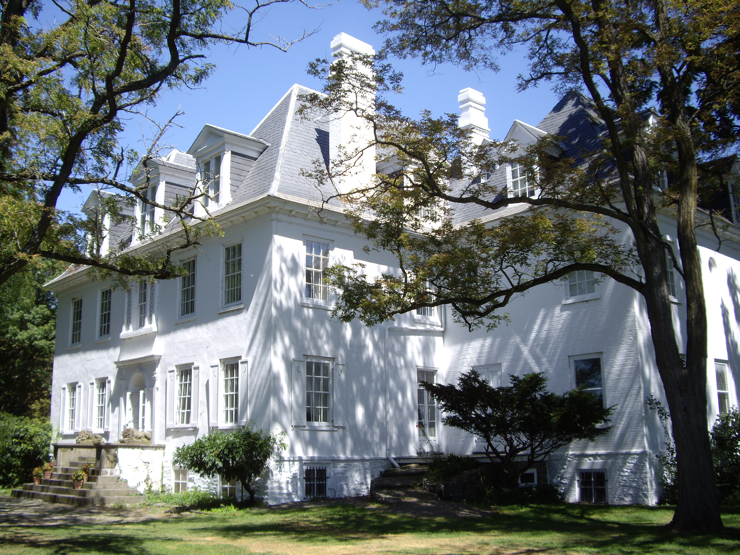
Livingston family mansion at the Clermont State Historic Site

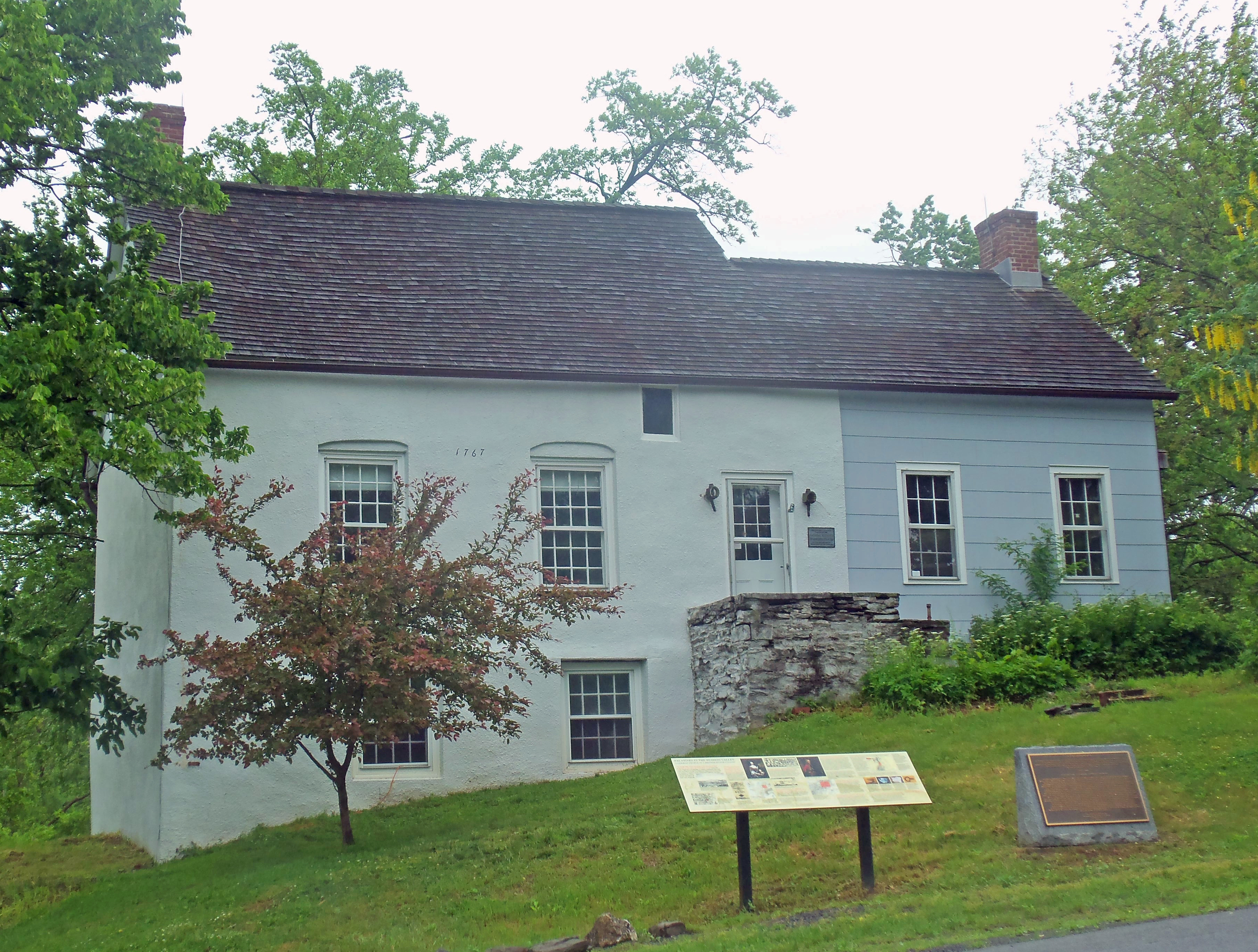
German Reformed Sanctity Church and Parsonage

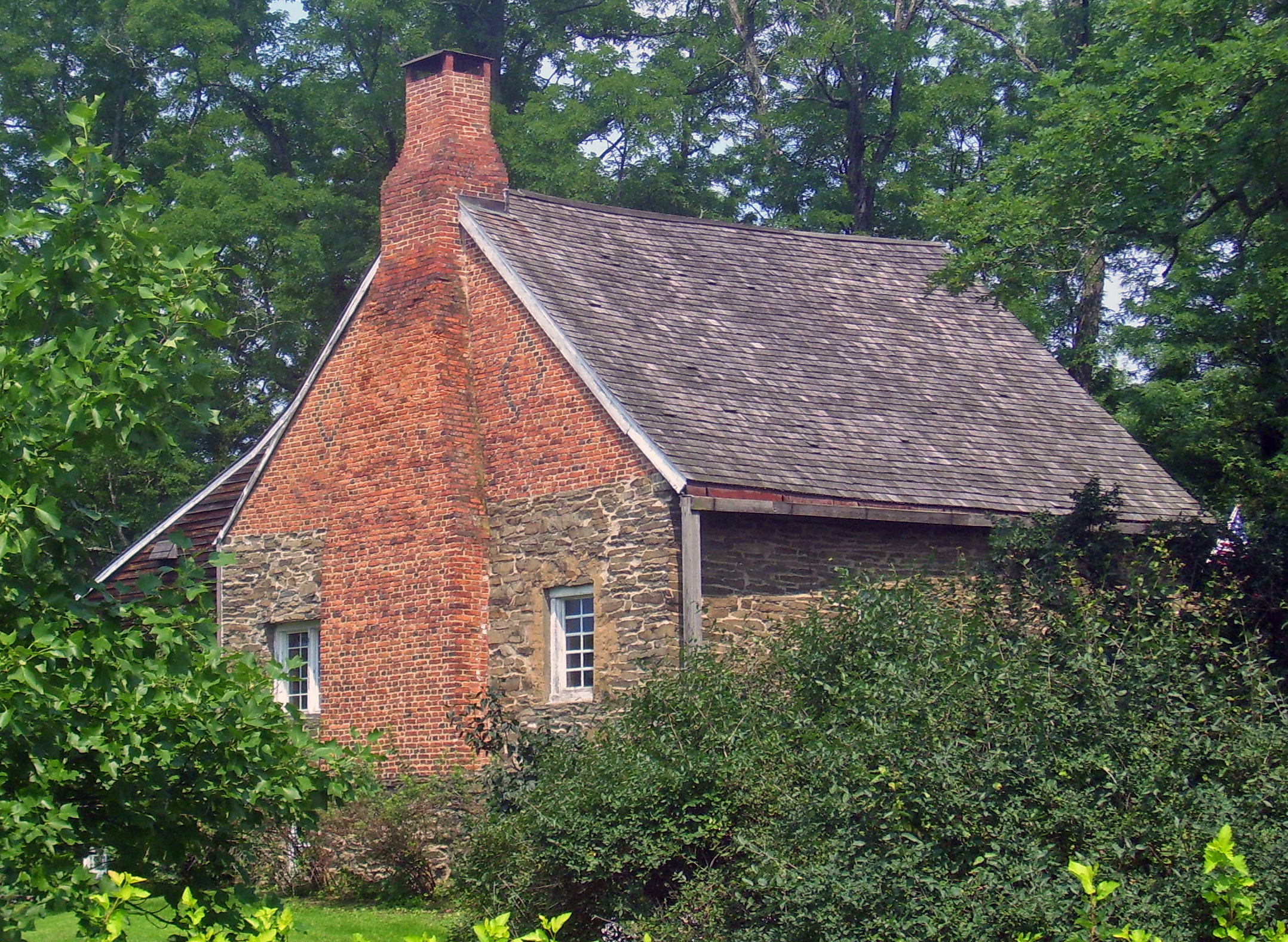
Stone Jug

== Local news sources ==
- Rural Intelligence
- The Columbia Paper

== Notable people ==
- Corbin Bernsen, actor
- Dow Hover, New York State executioner
- Amanda Pays, actor, interior designer (one of many homes)
- Sonny Rollins, saxophonist
- Oliver Stone, film director
- Daniel Day-Lewis, actor

== Communities and locations in Germantown ==
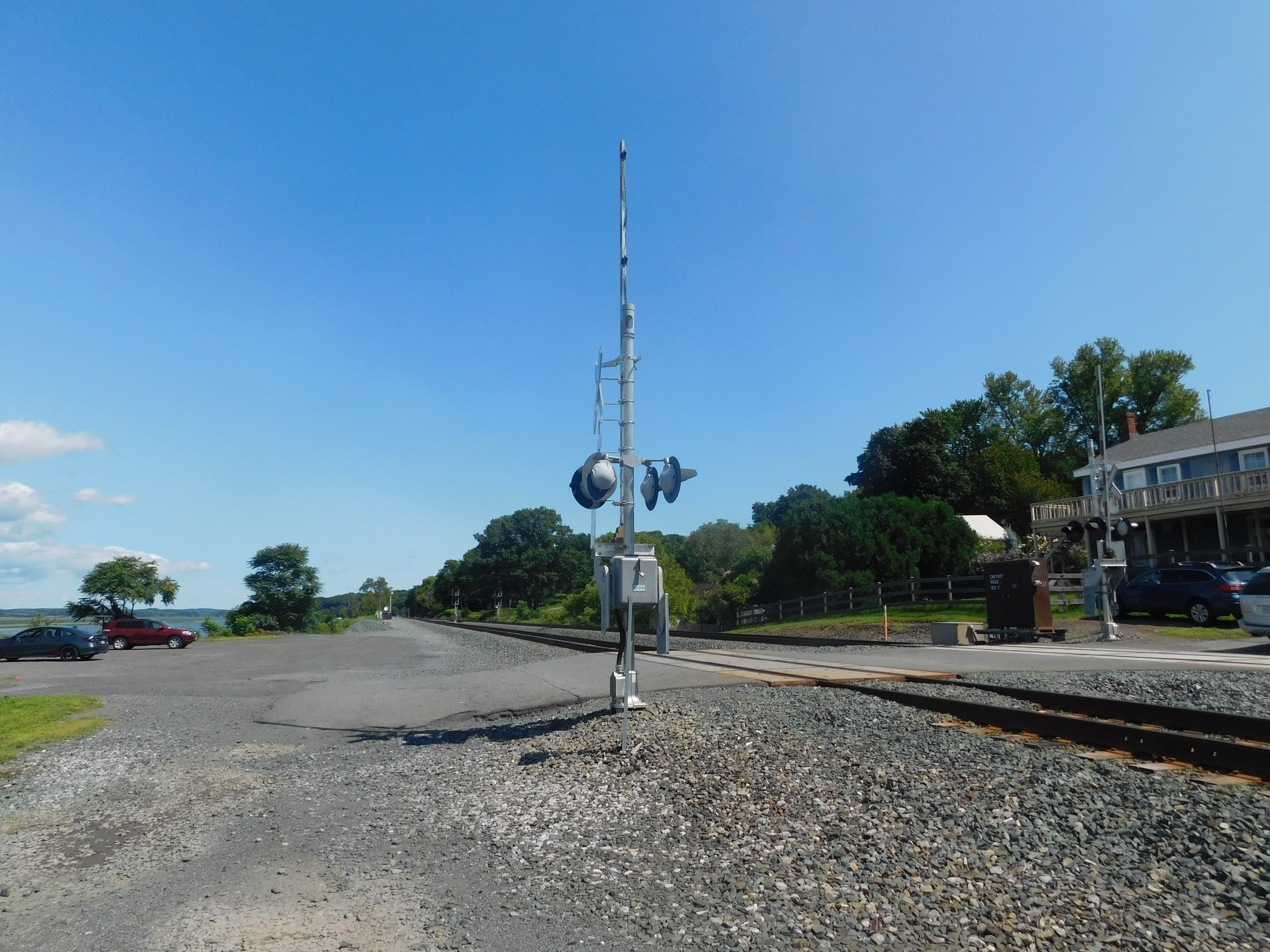
Cheviot Landing in Germantown in August 2026

- Cheviot – A hamlet near the Hudson River, south of Germantown hamlet.
- Germantown – The hamlet of Germantown is located near the Hudson River on Route 9G.
- North Germantown – A hamlet on Route 9G, north of Germantown hamlet.
- Palatine Park – A park northeast of Germantown hamlet.
- Viewmont – A hamlet on the southern town line.

== Nearby attractions ==
- Bard College
- Hudson
- Olana State Historic Site
- Catskill Hiking
- Van Alen House, Kinderhook, NY
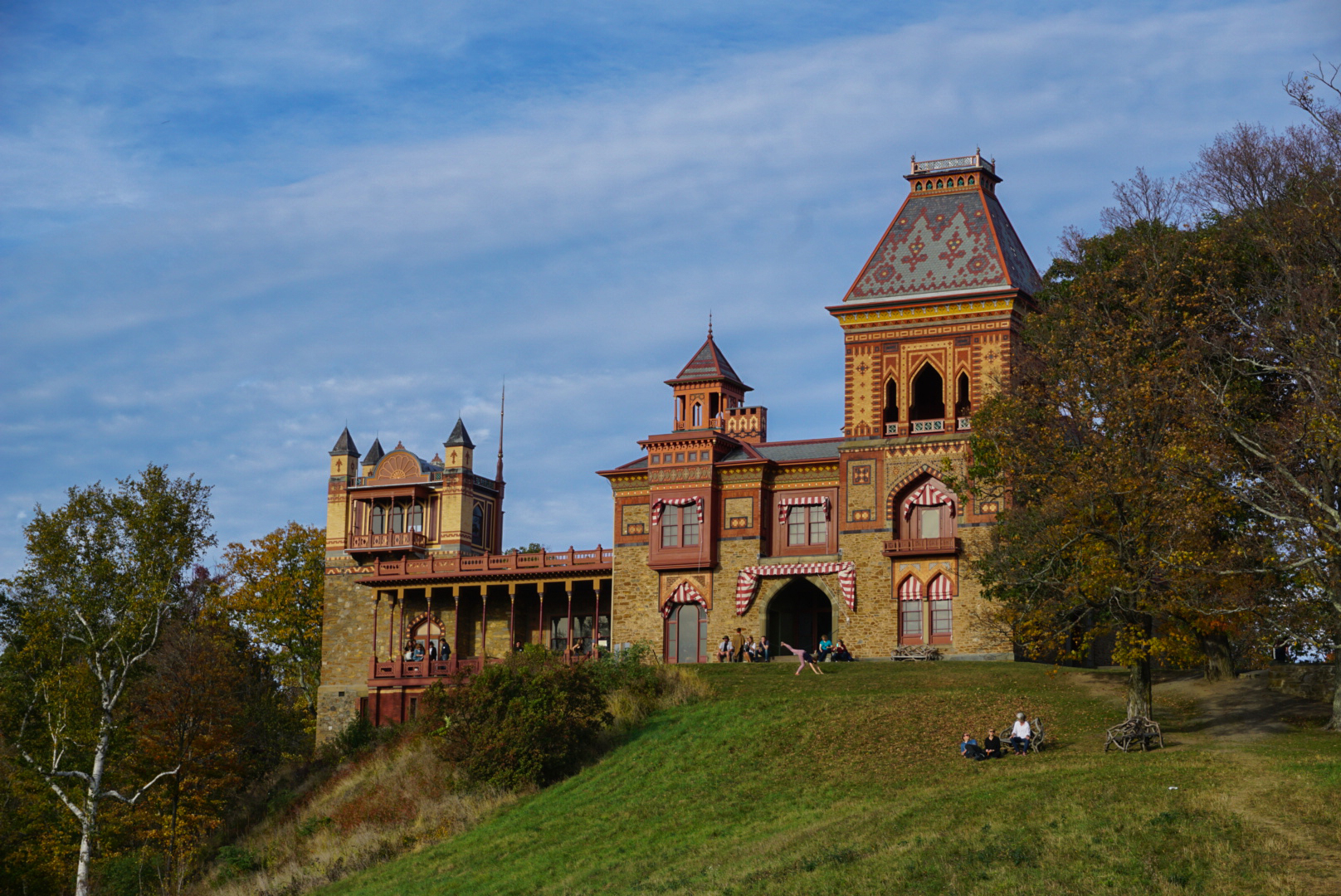
The grounds of Olana are 7 miles north of Germantown

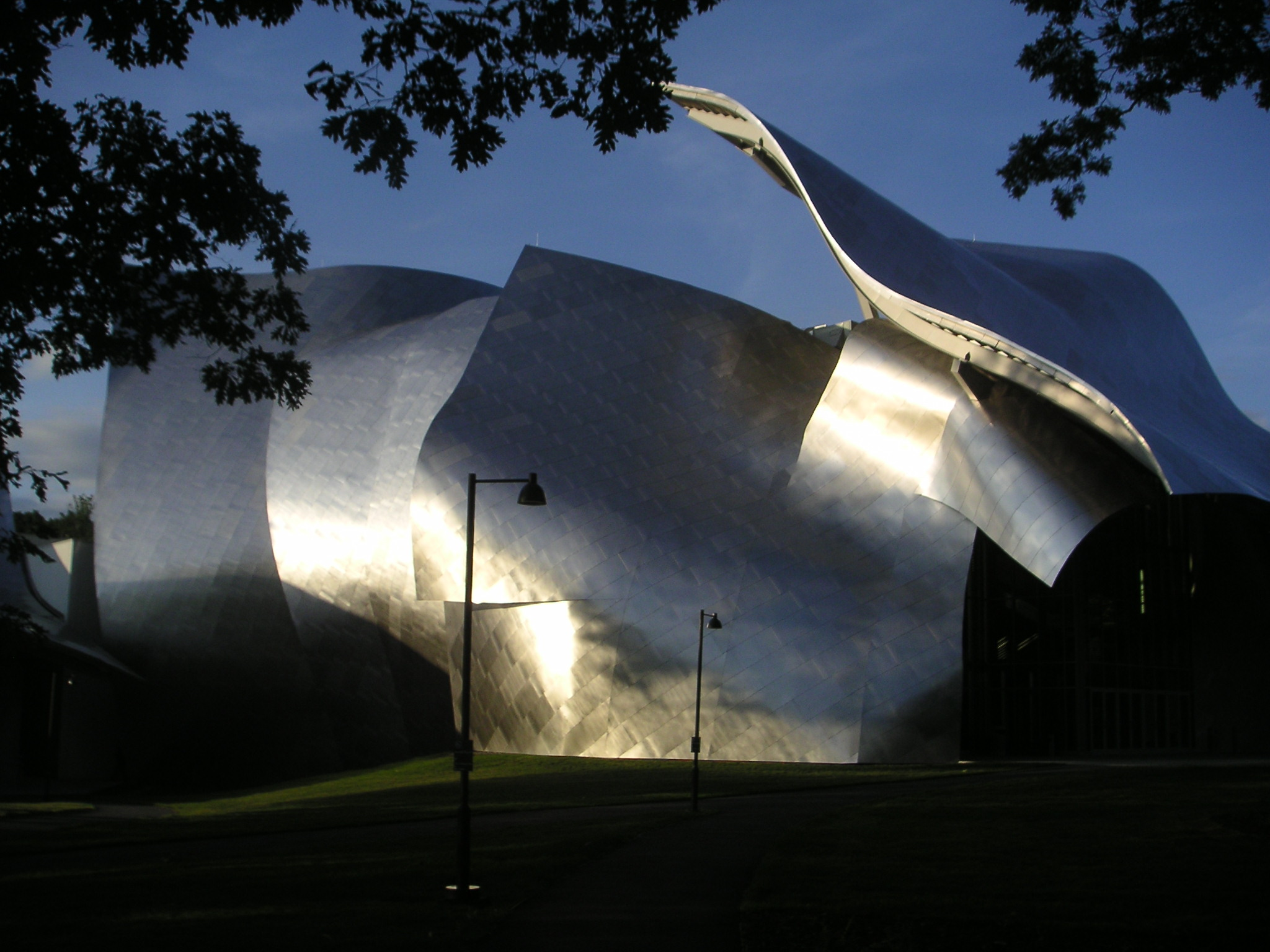
Richard B. Fisher Center for the Performing Arts at Bard
