= St. Luke's Church (Clermont, New York) =

Historic church in New York

- U.S. National Register of Historic Places
- U.S. Historic district – Contributing property
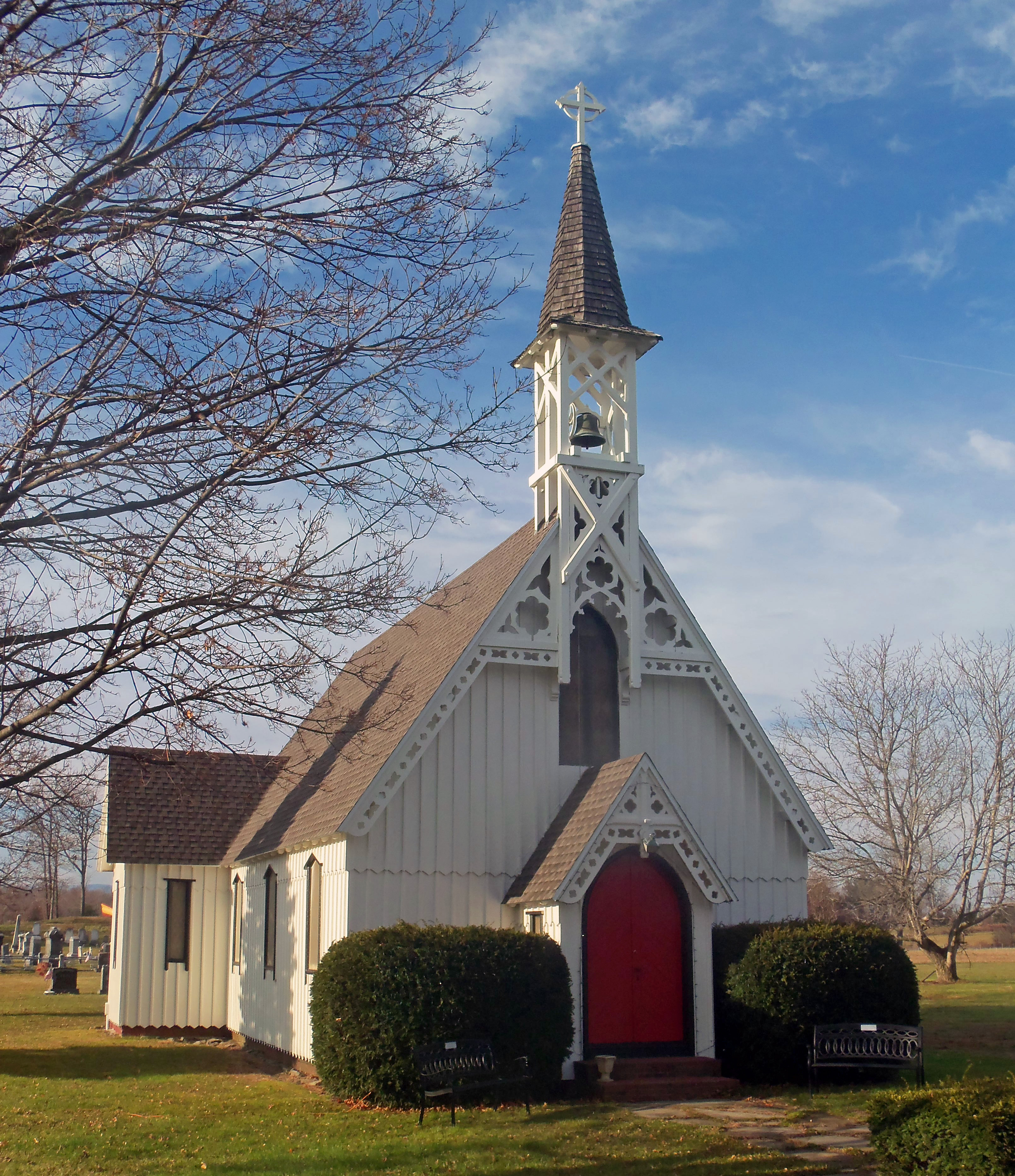
- East elevation, 2012

- Location within New York Location within the United States
- Location: US 9, Clermont, New York
- Coordinates: 42°5′14″N 73°49′32″W
- Area: 0.5 acres (0.20 ha)
- Built: 1857
- Architect: Upjohn, Richard M.; VanDyke, Thomas
- Architectural style: Gothic Revival
- MPS: Clermont MRA
- NRHP reference No.: 83003936
- Added to NRHP: October 7, 1983

St. Luke's Church is a historic church on US 9 in Clermont, Columbia County, New York. It was built in 1857 and is a one-story, Gothic Revival style frame church with a steeply pitched gable roof and board and batten siding. It features a large open framed bell tower with a polygonal steeple and elaborate trim. The entry porch gable roof has a decorative bargeboard. It was designed by noted ecclesiastical architect Richard M. Upjohn (1828-1903). The church was decommissioned and was donated for town use in the 1970s.

It was listed on the National Register of Historic Places in 1983. It is located within the Clermont Civic Historic District, established in 2003.
