= National Register of Historic Places listings in Rhinebeck, New York =

List of the National Register of Historic Places listings in Rhinebeck, New York

This is intended to be a complete list of properties and districts listed (and one formerly listed) on the National Register of Historic Places in the town and village of Rhinebeck, New York, including in the hamlet of Rhinecliff. The locations of National Register properties and districts (at least for all showing latitude and longitude coordinates below) may be seen in an online map by clicking on "Map of all coordinates".

This National Park Service list is complete through NPS recent listings posted July 11, 2025.

Contents: Counties in New York
Albany (Albany) – Allegany – Bronx – Broome – Cattaraugus – Cayuga – Chautauqua – Chemung – Chenango – Clinton – Columbia – Cortland – Delaware – Dutchess (Poughkeepsie, Rhinebeck) – Erie (Buffalo) – Essex – Franklin – Fulton – Genesee – Greene – Hamilton – Herkimer – Jefferson – Kings – Lewis – Livingston – Madison – Monroe (Rochester) – Montgomery – Nassau – New York (Below 14th Street, 14th to 59th Streets, 59th to 110th Streets, Above 110th Street, Islands) – Niagara (Niagara Falls) – Oneida – Onondaga (Syracuse) – Ontario – Orange – Orleans – Oswego – Otsego – Putnam – Queens – Rensselaer – Richmond – Rockland – St. Lawrence – Saratoga – Schenectady – Schoharie – Schuyler – Seneca – Steuben – Suffolk – Sullivan – Tioga – Tompkins – Ulster – Warren – Washington – Wayne – Westchester (Northern, Southern, New Rochelle, Peekskill, Yonkers) – Wyoming – Yates

== Listed on the National Register ==
	Name on the Register	Image	Date listed	Location	City or town	Description
1	Astor Home for Children	Astor Home for Children	July 9, 1987 (#87001098)	36 Mill St. 41°55′29″N 73°54′49″W	Rhinebeck	1914 institutional building by McKim, Mead and White in Jacobean Revival style
2	Barringer Farmhouse		July 9, 1987 (#87001076)	US 9; 41°53′39″N 73°54′49″W	Rhinebeck	
3	Benner House	Benner House	July 9, 1987 (#87001067)	1 Mill St. 41°55′14″N 73°54′36″W	Rhinebeck	1739 stone house is rare example of Hudson Valley one-room house in German vernacular tradition. It is the Oldest House in Rhinebeck Village.
4	Cox Farmhouse	Cox Farmhouse	July 9, 1987 (#87001078)	Old Post Rd. N 41°56′54″N 73°54′34″W	Rhinebeck	18th-century stone house remodeled in mid-19th century
5	Henry Delamater House	Henry Delamater House	May 7, 1973 (#73001185)	44 Montgomery St. 41°55′42″N 73°54′49″W	Rhinebeck	Very ornate 1844 Carpenter Gothic house
6	Evangelical Lutheran Church of St. Peter	Evangelical Lutheran Church of St. Peter	April 24, 1975 (#75001182)	2.25 mi (3.62 km). N of Rhinebeck on U.S. 9; 41°57′45″N 73°53′12″W	Rhinebeck	1786 rural stone church built for congregation started in 1730s. Known locally as Old Stone Church.
7	Evergreen Lands		July 9, 1987 (#87001096)	Delano Dr. 41°53′06″N 73°54′25″W	Rhinebeck	
8	Fredenburg House		July 9, 1987 (#87001068)	Old Post Rd. 41°54′04″N 73°54′45″W	Rhinebeck	
9	Free Church Parsonage	Free Church Parsonage	July 9, 1987 (#87001090)	Jct. of William and Grinnell Sts. 41°55′03″N 73°57′09″W	Rhinecliff	
10	Grasmere	Grasmere	July 9, 1987 (#87001093)	Mill Rd. 41°54′48″N 73°54′43″W	Rhinebeck	
11	The Grove	The Grove	July 9, 1987 (#87001094)	Jct. of Miller Rd. and NY 308; 41°56′24″N 73°52′40″W	Rhinebeck	
12	Heermance House and Law Office	Heermance House and Law Office	July 9, 1987 (#87001091)	Jct. of Rhinecliff and Long Dock Rds. 41°55′42″N 73°56′39″W	Rhinecliff	
13	Hillside Methodist Church	Hillside Methodist Church	July 9, 1987 (#87001084)	US 9; 41°53′06″N 73°54′42″W	Rhinebeck	
14	Hudson River Heritage Historic District	Hudson River Heritage Historic District	December 14, 1990 (#90002219)	E. side Hudson R. between Germantown and Staatsburg; 41°55′42″N 73°56′14″W	Rhinecliff	35-square-mile (91 km^{2}) strip of Hudson River shoreline and inland with land use and architecture strongly reflecting quasi-feudal ownership
15	Kip-Beekman-Heermance Site (A027-16-0223)	Kip-Beekman-Heermance Site (A027-16-0223)	April 19, 1989 (#89000260)	County Rd 85; 41°55′34″N 73°56′45″W	Rhinecliff	Site of Kip-Beekman House; historic marker on site
16	Mansakenning		July 9, 1987 (#87001095)	Ackert Hook Rd. 41°54′18″N 73°54′00″W	Rhinebeck	
17	The Maples	The Maples	July 9, 1987 (#87001092)	108 Montgomery St. 41°56′09″N 73°54′57″W	Rhinebeck	1833 Greek Revival house with 1860s Picturesque detailing.
18	J. W. Moore House	J. W. Moore House	July 9, 1987 (#87001085)	245 Mill Rd. 41°53′59″N 73°55′37″W	Rhinebeck	
19	Morton Memorial Library	Morton Memorial Library	July 9, 1987 (#87001089)	Kelly St. 41°55′08″N 73°57′06″W	Rhinecliff	1905 Colonial Revival house situated on a small knoll along a local street.
20	Neher-Elseffer House	Neher-Elseffer House	April 18, 2003 (#03000246)	6196 US 9; 41°57′32″N 73°53′32″W	Rhinebeck	1746 house is a rare surviving pre-Revolutionary frame house in area. Now owned by town.
21	O'Brien General Store and Post Office	O'Brien General Store and Post Office	July 9, 1987 (#87001088)	Jct. of Schatzell Ave. and Charles St. 41°55′11″N 73°57′06″W	Rhinecliff	
22	Jan Pier House	Jan Pier House	July 9, 1987 (#87001073)	NY 308; 41°55′43″N 73°53′45″W	Rhinebeck	1761 Dutch stone house remodeled with mansard roof in 1881
23	Pilgrim's Progress Road Bridge	Pilgrim's Progress Road Bridge	July 9, 1987 (#87001102)	Miller Rd. S of NY 308; 41°56′22″N 73°52′50″W	Rhinebeck	
24	Progue House	Progue House	July 9, 1987 (#87001072)	Primrose Hill Rd. 41°53′17″N 73°52′53″W	Rhinebeck	
25	Rhinebeck Village Historic District	Rhinebeck Village Historic District	August 8, 1979 (#79001578)	U.S. 9 and NY 308; also portions of Platt Ave., Mill, Oak, Mulberry, and North Parsonage Sts. 41°55′41″N 73°54′33″W	Rhinebeck	Well-preserved and cohesive collection of historic buildings; boundary increase approved January 15, 2021
26	Rhinecliff Hotel	Rhinecliff Hotel	July 9, 1987 (#87001087)	Schatzell Ave. 41°55′11″N 73°57′10″W	Rhinecliff	
27	Riverside Methodist Church and Parsonage	Riverside Methodist Church and Parsonage	July 9, 1987 (#87001086)	Charles and Orchard Sts. 41°55′12″N 73°57′03″W	Rhinecliff	
28	Rock Ledge		November 28, 1989 (#89002010)	Roughly Ackert Hook Rd., Haggerty Hill Rd., and Troy Dr. 41°53′41″N 73°53′43″W	Rhinebeck	
29	Salisbury Turnpike Bridge	Salisbury Turnpike Bridge	July 9, 1987 (#87001100)	Old Turnpike Rd. 41°56′20″N 73°52′46″W	Rhinebeck	
30	Sipperly Lown Farmhouse	Sipperly Lown Farmhouse	July 9, 1987 (#87001101)	US 9; 41°57′57″N 73°53′08″W	Rhinebeck	19th-century farm complex with Dutch barn and eclectic Victorian 1868 farmhouse
31	Sixteen Mile District	Sixteen Mile District	March 7, 1979 (#79001571)	W of Clermont along Hudson River; 41°57′12″N 73°55′29″W	Rhinebeck	
32	Slate Quarry Road Dutch Barn	Slate Quarry Road Dutch Barn	July 9, 1987 (#87001077)	Slate Quarry Rd. 41°54′39″N 73°51′32″W	Rhinebeck	
33	Steenburg Tavern		July 9, 1987 (#87001070)	US 9; 41°54′36″N 73°54′33″W	Rhinebeck	
34	Stonecrest	Stonecrest	July 9, 1987 (#87001097)	Old Post Rd. 41°52′33″N 73°54′49″W	Rhinebeck	
35	Strawberry Hill	Strawberry Hill	July 9, 1987 (#87001071)	Ackert Hook Rd. 41°52′58″N 73°53′02″W	Rhinebeck	Built in 1762. Sold to George Adam Asher by Henry Beekman in 1774. It was later the home of A.D. Rothman, a White House news correspondent.
36	Traver House	Traver House	July 9, 1987 (#87001069)	Wynkoop Ln. 41°56′30″N 73°53′51″W	Rhinebeck	1730 stone house, built into hillside, expanded in 1790
37	J. E. Traver Farm	J. E. Traver Farm	July 9, 1987 (#87001082)	Violet Hill Rd. 41°55′34″N 73°52′31″W	Rhinebeck	
38	US Post Office-Rhinebeck	US Post Office-Rhinebeck	May 11, 1989 (#88002419)	6383 Mill St. 41°55′34″N 73°54′49″W	Rhinebeck	Built in imitation of Beekman House under the direction of then-President Franklin D. Roosevelt
39	Van Vredenburg Farm	Van Vredenburg Farm	July 9, 1987 (#87001079)	57 Cedar Heights Rd. 41°57′07″N 73°52′45″W	Rhinebeck	
40	Williams Farm	Williams Farm	July 9, 1987 (#87001080)	Enterprise Rd. 41°56′09″N 73°50′08″W	Rhinebeck	Farm centered around 1835 Greek Revival house

== Former listings ==
	Name on the Register	Image	Date listed	Date removed	Location	Description
1	Robert Sands Estate		February 24, 1975 (#75001183)	August 3, 2015	1.5 mi (2.4 km). E of Rhinebeck at NY 308 and NY 9; 41°56′06″N 73°52′40″W	Only foundations remain after 1999 fire

== See also ==
- National Register of Historic Places listings in Dutchess County, New York
- National Register of Historic Places listings in New York
