= Traver =

Traver may refer to:

== People ==
- Álvaro Traver (born 1993), Spanish footballer
- Andrew L. Traver, U.S. Government administrator
- Daniel Gimeno Traver (born 1985), Spanish professional tennis player
- Harrison B. Traver (1881-1973), American architect
- Harry Traver (1877–1961), American engineer and roller coaster designer
- Jay Traver (1894–1974), American entomologist
- William R. Traver (1818–????), American politician

== Places ==
- Traver, California, United States, a census-designated place
- Traver House, a historic home in Rhinebeck, New York, United States
- J. E. Traver Farm, a historic home and farm complex in Rhinebeck, New York, United States
- John H. Traver Farm, a historic home and farm complex in Württemberg, New York, United States

== See also ==
- Travers (disambiguation)
