= Stonecrest =

Stonecrest may refer to:

- Stonecrest (Bedford Corners, New York), listed on the National Register of Historic Places in Westchester County, New York
- Stonecrest (Rhinebeck, New York), listed on the National Register of Historic Places in Dutchess County, New York
- Stonecrest, Georgia, which incorporated as a city in 2017 after approval in a 2016 referendum
