= Evangelical Lutheran Church of St. Peter =

Historic church in New York, United States

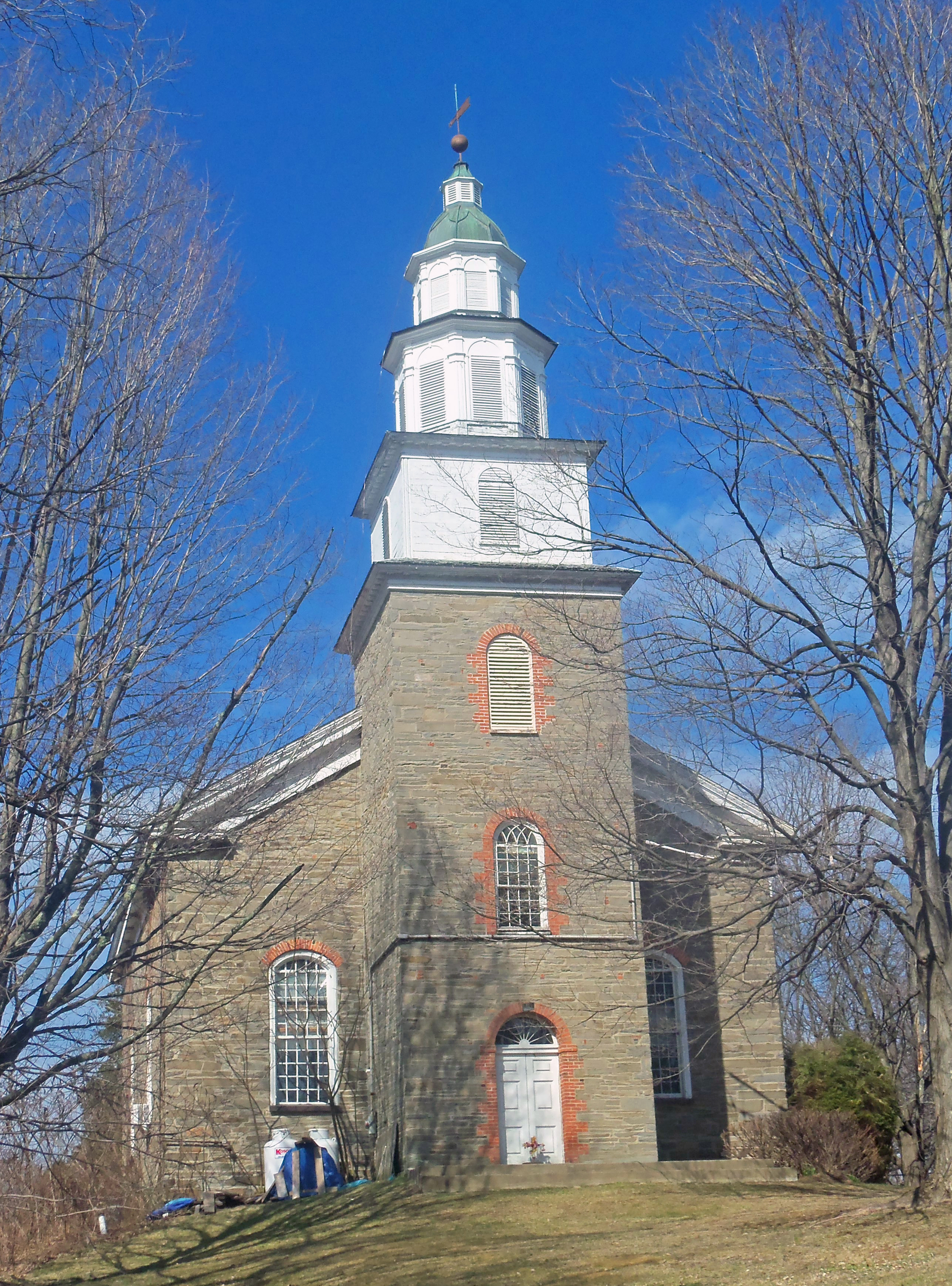
- South elevation, 2013

Religion
- Affiliation: Lutheran

Location
- Location: Rhinebeck, New York, United States
- Interactive map of Evangelical Lutheran Church of St. Peter
- Coordinates: 41°57′46″N 73°53′11″W

Architecture
- Architect: Stephen McCarty
- Type: Church
- Completed: 1786

Specifications
- Direction of façade: South
- Materials: Stone, wood, stucco

U.S. National Historic Landmark
- Added to NRHP: April 24, 1975
- NRHP Reference no.: 75001182
- Designated as NHL
- Evangelical Lutheran Church of St. Peter
- U.S. National Register of Historic Places
- U.S. Historic district
- Location within New York Location within the United States
- Nearest city: Rhinebeck, New York
- Area: 7 acres (2.8 ha)
- Built: 1786
- Architect: McCarty, Stephen
- MPS: Rhinebeck Town MRA (AD)
- NRHP reference No.: 75001182
- Added to NRHP: April 24, 1975

The Evangelical Lutheran Church of St. Peter, known locally as the Old Stone Church, is located on US 9 in the Town of Rhinebeck, New York, United States. It is a stone church built in the late 18th century by the area's Palatine German immigrant population. It has been renovated significantly since then. The church congregation was established in 1729.

Worshippers at first were those who farmed the surrounding areas, but as the nearby villages of Rhinebeck and Red Hook grew and Lutheran churches were established there, the local congregation dwindled. Today only quarterly meetings are held. In 1975 it and the accompanying parsonage (now home to the Museum of Rhinebeck History) and schoolhouse were listed on the National Register of Historic Places (NRHP).

== Property ==
The church and outbuildings are located on a 7-acre (2.8 ha) parcel on the west side of a curved stretch of Route 9, just 0.6 mile (1 km) north of its junction with NY 9G. It is midway between the villages of Rhinebeck and Red Hook, on a gentle rise in the land.

The main building, the church, is directly opposite the junction with Stone Church Road. It is a three-by-five-bay fieldstone two-and-a-half-story edifice with a four-story tower in its southeast corner. The east and west walls are fenestrated with high round-arched glass windows trimmed in brick. The main entrance is located on the east side of the tower. Inside the pulpit is on the west, with galleries of pews on the other three sides.

The tower itself is built in four stages. The first three stories are fieldstone, with brick-trimmed round-arched openings matching those on the building. They are filled with doors on two sides of the first story, windows on the second and louvered vents on the third. The second stage is a square, flushboard-sided wood segment with round-arched louvered vents. It is topped with an octagonal section trimmed with pilasters at the corners and finally the cupola, crowned with a weathervane and gold ball.

Stephen McCarty, a local builder, was contractor for changes implemented during 1823–24 that re-oriented the church, that convertit from a meetinghouse type space into a church type space, and that added a tower.

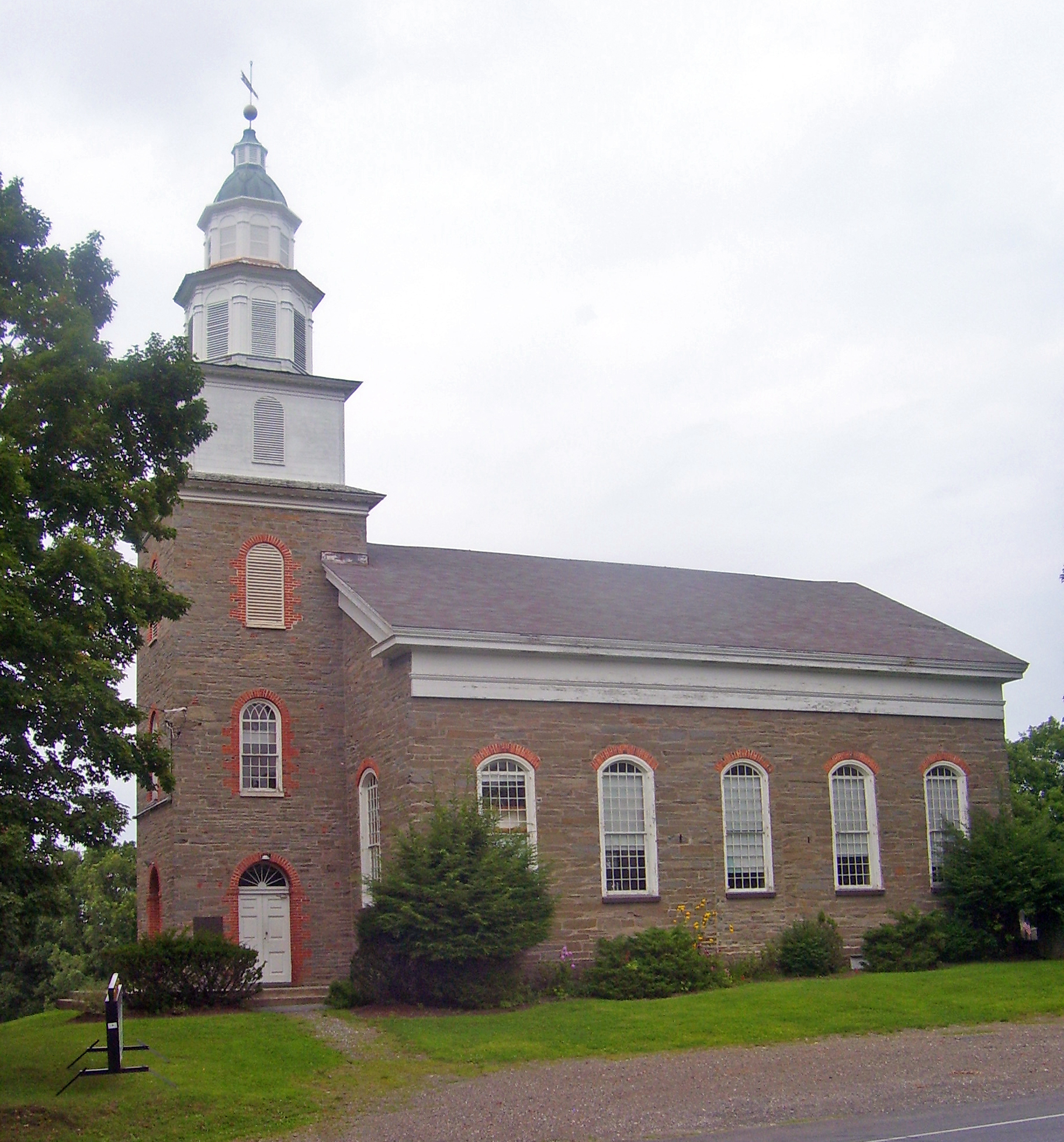
North elevation, 2008

To the south along the highway is the schoolhouse. It is a one-story clapboard-sided frame building with a gabled metal roof pierced by a brick chimney. Its corners are pilastered as well and there is a small cornice.

The parsonage is to the north, past the church cemetery. It is a two-story frame building on a stone basement with a gabled roof now done in modern shingles. There is a two-story frame wing, added later, on the rear. The roof's eaves have a boxed cornice and plain frieze. On the front is a flat-roofed porch supported by octagonal columns. The first floor has the original Federal style mantels.

== History ==
Britain had offered its North American colonies as a refuge to Palatine Germans who fled to escape religious persecution following the War of Spanish Succession in the early 18th century. After years in work camps to pay back the cost of passage, in a failed attempt by the British to produce naval stores on the lands of the Livingston family in today's Columbia County, some of the Germans settled in today's Rhinebeck, swelling the population of an area lightly settled by the Dutch a few decades before.

In 1715, the Lutheran Germans built a church to share with members of the Dutch Reformed Church until they could establish their own. They were able to do this 14 years later, in 1729. The next year they built their first church on the site of the current building, midway between the two small settlements in the region along the Albany Post Road. At that time the main entrance was in the center of the eastern wall, and there was no tower.

By 1786 the congregation had grown to the point that a new building was necessary. It followed the meetinghouse plan, with the exception of the corner tower. The parsonage came later, in 1798, when The Rev. Friedrich Quitman, a man reported to be of high regard within American Lutheranism of the time, was hired as pastor. His son John, later to serve as a general in the Mexican–American War and as governor of Mississippi, was born in the house that year.

Later in Quitman's pastorate, in the early 1820s, the congregation hired a local builder named Stephen McCarty to do $3,000 ($81,000 in contemporary dollars) worth of renovations to the church. Following the plans of Christopher Wren's churches in London, its original plan was altered to make it more formal. The original side entrance was closed off, longitudinal aisles were introduced and the pews arranged to focus attention on the pulpit. The tower was added as well.

After Quitman's death in 1832, the congregation built the school building. In 1843 all walls save the west one were resurfaced in stucco, and Venetian shutters (currently stored in the tower) were added to the windows. The growth of the villages and the subsequent establishment of Lutheran churches in them led to a decline in membership at St. Peter. In 1860 the church broke with the Lutheran Synod, making it hard to find a new pastor and costing it more members.

Renovations continued apace. In 1870 a new pulpit, platform and accompanying furniture were installed. The current pipe organ came along in 1882. Stained glass windows, since removed, were installed in 1890, the last major alteration to the original building.

Around that time, John Jacob Astor bought much of the land in the area for his estate, which had been home to most of the remaining congregants, and later demolished the residences. This exacerbated the decline in membership. The church was still able to continue as a weekly church until 1939, when its members finally went back to the quarterly meetings, the minimum activity necessary to qualify as a separate church.

The area's Lutheran churches still hold occasional services there, and a small local church meets there. The parsonage and school have been used by the Museum of Rhinebeck History since 1993.

== See also ==
- National Register of Historic Places listings in Rhinebeck, New York

== Gallery ==
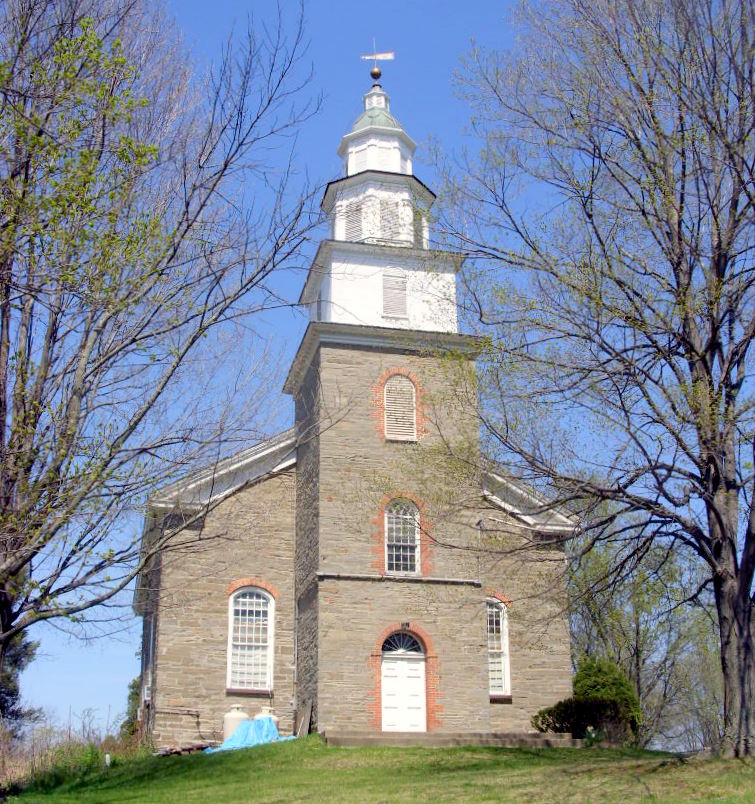
Front elevation, April 2009

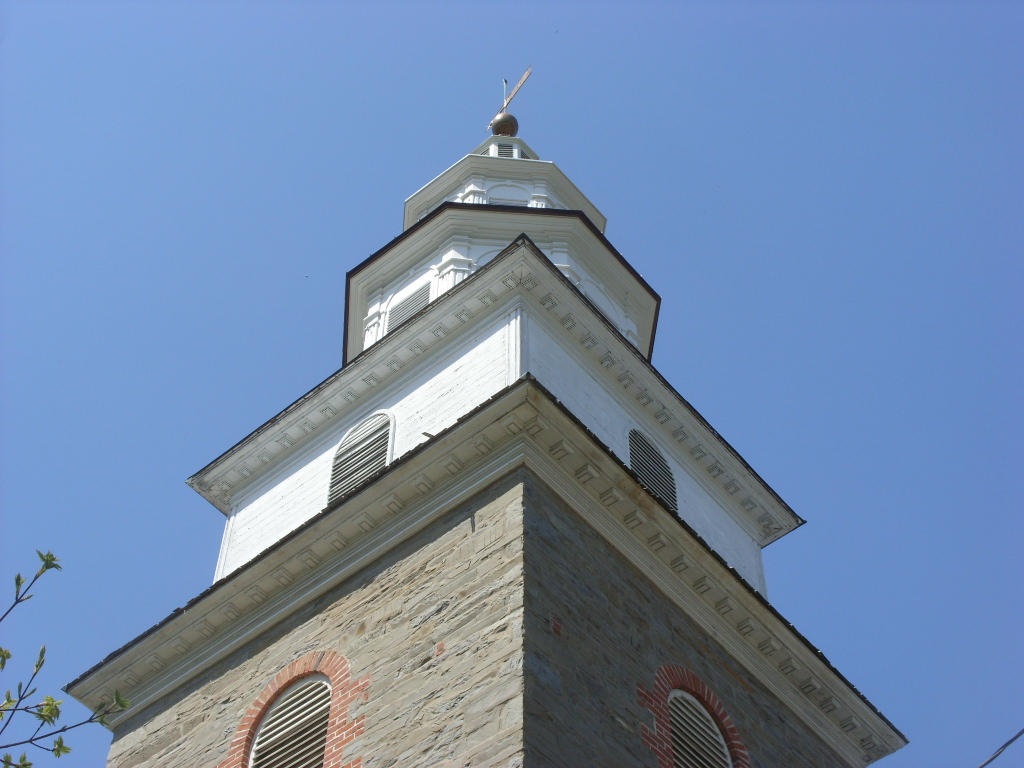
Steeple detail, April 2009
