= Williams Farm (Rhinebeck, New York) =

- U.S. National Register of Historic Places
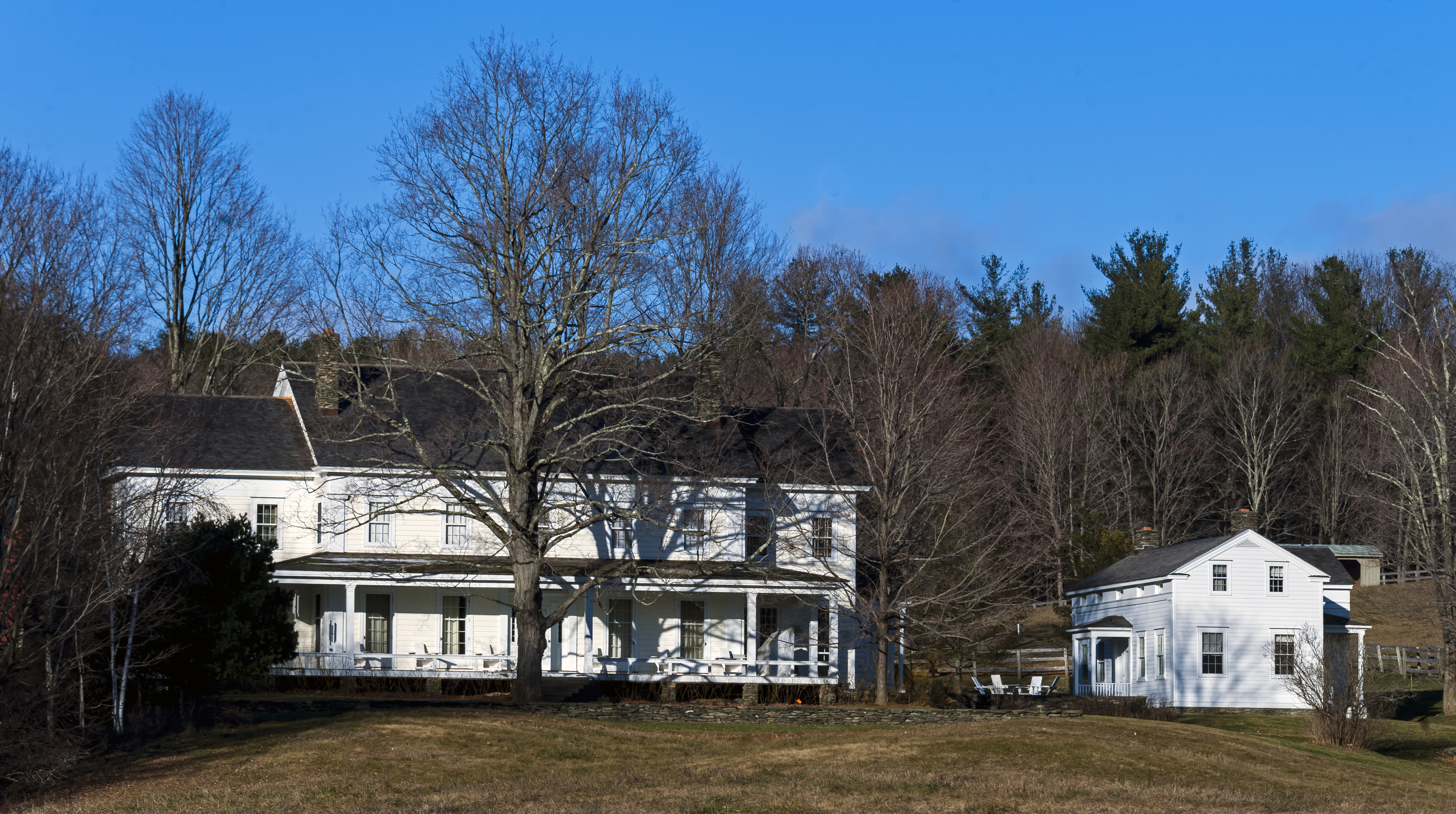
- Main house and guest cottage from south, 2016

- Location within New York Location within the United States
- Location: Enterprise Rd., Rhinebeck, New York
- Coordinates: 41°56′9″N 73°50′8″W
- Area: 109 acres (44 ha)
- Built: c. 1835
- Architectural style: Greek Revival
- MPS: Rhinebeck Town MRA
- NRHP reference No.: 87001080
- Added to NRHP: July 9, 1987

Williams Farm is a historic home and farm complex located at Rhinebeck, Dutchess County, New York. The farmhouse was built about 1835 and is a 1 1/2-story, five-bay frame building in the Greek Revival style. It is topped by a gable roof and sits on a slightly raised stone foundation. It features a 1-story, flat-roof front porch with square, Doric order columns. Also on the property are three contributing barns, two stone walls, a pond / dam, and a guest cottage.

It was added to the National Register of Historic Places in 1987.

== See also ==
- National Register of Historic Places listings in Rhinebeck, New York
