= Rock Ledge =

Rock Ledge can refer to:

- Rock Ledge (Norwalk, Connecticut), listed on NRHP
- Rock Ledge (Rhinebeck, New York), NRHP
- Rock Ledge (Kingsport, Tennessee), NRHP
