= Neher =

Neher is a surname, and may refer to:

- André Neher, Jewish scholar and philosopher (1914–1988)
- Carola Neher, German actress (1900-1942)
- Caspar Neher, stage-designer (1897–1962)
- Erwin Neher, German biophysicist (born 1944)
- Fred Neher, American cartoonist (1903-2001)
- Jim Neher, baseball pitcher (1889-1951)
- Lambertus Neher, Dutch politician (1889-1967)
- Richard A. Neher, German biophysicist (born 1979)
- Stephan Jakob Neher, Church historian (1829-1902)

It may also refer to:

- Neher–McGrath calculations for underground cable temperatures
- Neher–Elseffer House, one of the rare pre-American Revolution frame houses
