= Jan Pier House =

Historic house in New York, United States

- U.S. National Register of Historic Places
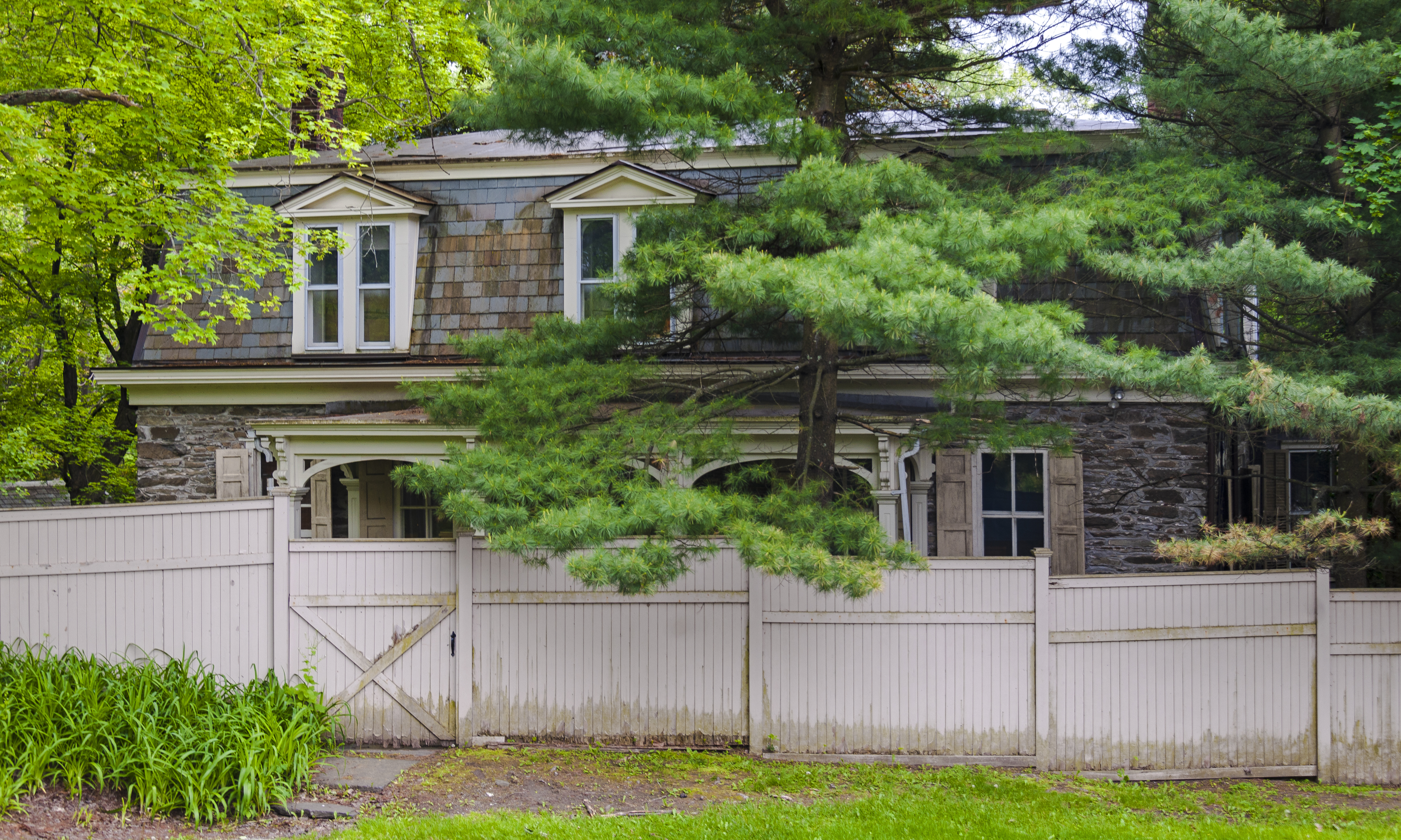
- North (front) elevation, 2017

- Location within New York Location within the United States
- Location: NY 308, Rhinebeck, New York
- Coordinates: 41°55′42″N 73°53′45″W
- Area: 3.5 acres (1.4 ha)
- Built: c. 1761
- Architectural style: Second Empire
- MPS: Rhinebeck Town MRA
- NRHP reference No.: 87001073
- Added to NRHP: July 9, 1987

The Jan Pier House is a historic home located at Rhinebeck, Dutchess County, New York. The farmhouse was built about 1761 and remodeled about 1881 in a Second Empire style. It is a one- to two story, asymmetrical stone building built into a hillside. It features a Mansard roof sheathed in polychrome slate. Also on the property are two contributing barns, a smoke house, wellhouse / well, and a cistern.

It was added to the National Register of Historic Places in 1987.

== See also ==
- National Register of Historic Places listings in Rhinebeck, New York
