= Cox Farmhouse =

Historic house in New York, United States

- U.S. National Register of Historic Places
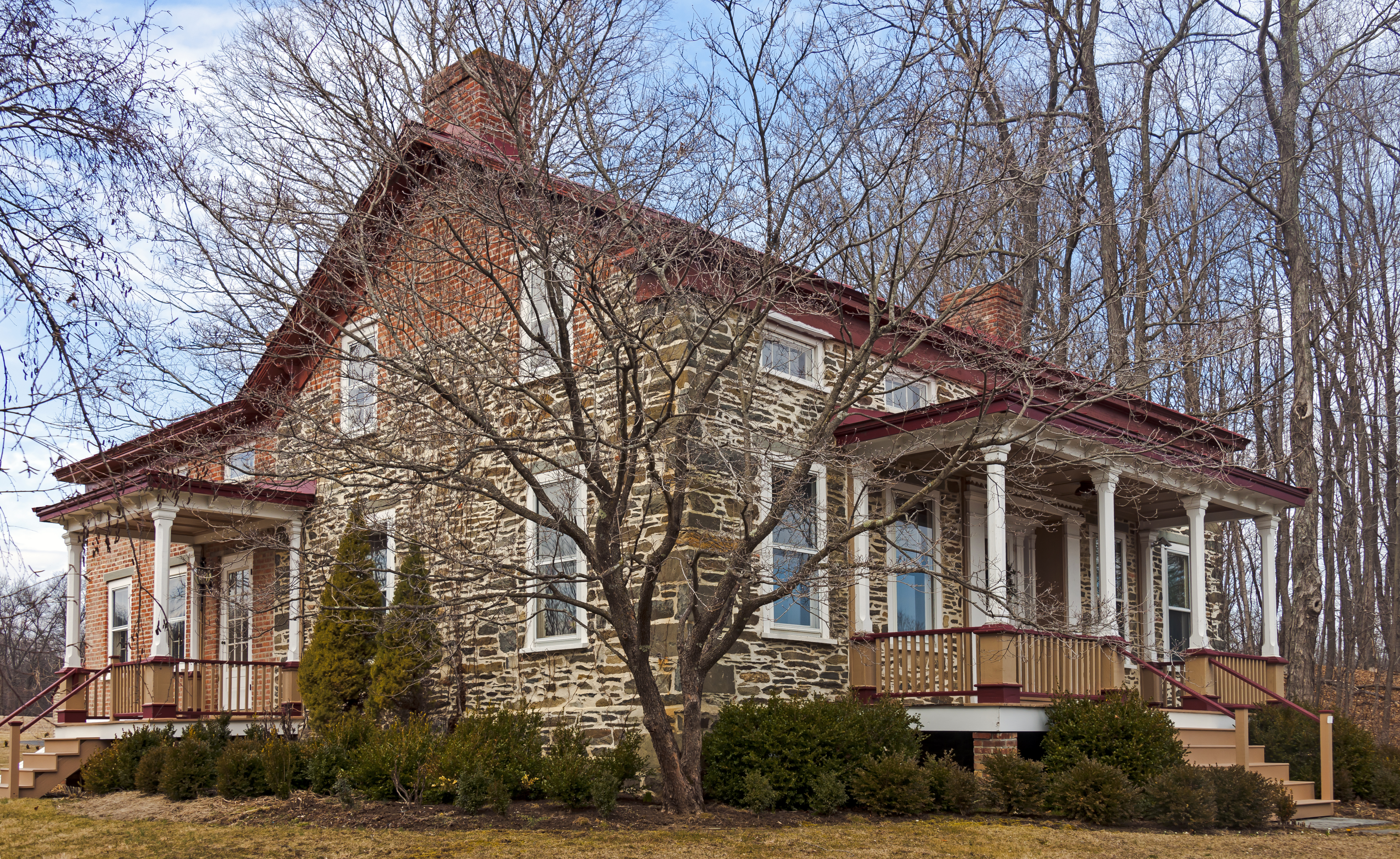
- South profile and east elevation, 2016

- Location within New York Location within the United States
- Location: Old Post Rd. N, Rhinebeck, New York
- Coordinates: 41°56′54″N 73°54′34″W
- Area: 3 acres (1.2 ha)
- Built: 1842
- Architectural style: Greek Revival
- MPS: Rhinebeck Town MRA
- NRHP reference No.: 87001078
- Added to NRHP: July 9, 1987

Cox Farmhouse is a historic home located at Rhinebeck, Dutchess County, New York. It was built in the mid- to late-18th century and expanded and remodeled in 1843. It is a 1 1/2-story, L-shaped, stone-and-brick dwelling in the Greek Revival style. It is five bays wide and two bays deep and is topped by a gable roof. It features an elaborate, ornamented entrance.

It was added to the National Register of Historic Places in 1987.

== See also ==
- National Register of Historic Places listings in Rhinebeck, New York
