= Strawberry Hill (Rhinebeck, New York) =

- U.S. National Register of Historic Places
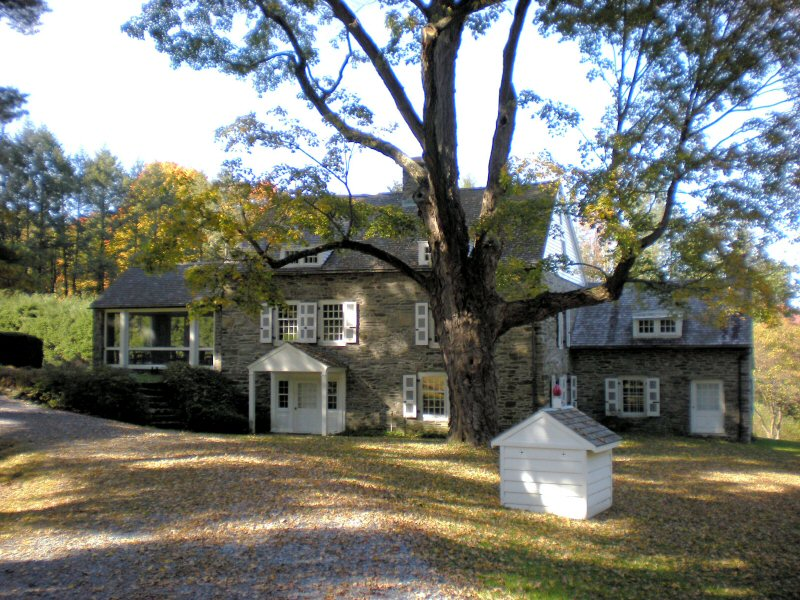

- Location within New York Location within the United States
- Location: Ackert Hook Rd., Rhinebeck, New York
- Coordinates: 41°52′58″N 73°53′2″W
- Area: 21.3 acres (8.6 ha)
- Built: 1762
- MPS: Rhinebeck Town MRA
- NRHP reference No.: 87001071
- Added to NRHP: July 09, 1987

Strawberry Hill is an historic farmstead located in a rural area within the town of Rhinebeck, New York. It contains several contributing structures, including an eighteenth-century farmhouse, a Dutch barn complex, a well, a wellhouse, an outhouse, and two sheds. The property is characterized by a mix of wooded terrain and open fields. It became a National Register of Historic Places listing on July 9, 1987.

== See also ==
- National Register of Historic Places listings in Rhinebeck, New York
