= Robert Sands Estate =

- Formerly listed on the U.S. National Register of Historic Places
- Location within New York Location within the United States
- Location: 1.5 mi (2.4 km). E of Rhinebeck at NY 308 and NY 9, Rhinebeck, New York
- Coordinates: 41°56′6″N 73°52′40″W
- Area: 150 acres (61 ha)
- Built: c. 1796
- MPS: Rhinebeck Town MRA (AD)
- NRHP reference No.: 75001183

Significant dates
- Added to NRHP: February 24, 1975
- Removed from NRHP: August 3, 2015

The Robert Sands Estate was a historic home located at Rhinebeck, Dutchess County, New York. The house was built about 1796 and is a 2 1/2-story, brick filled wood-frame building, with a gable roof and sheathed in clapboard. It sat on an extant stone foundation and measured five bays wide by four deep. Also on the property were a contributing 1 1/2-story frame cottage and four frame farm outbuildings, including a Dutch barn.

It was added to the National Register of Historic Places in 1987. In 2015 the National Park Service, which oversees the Register, announced that it was considering a request to remove it as a result of a 1999 fire that left only the foundation. It did so in August of that year.

== See also ==
- National Register of Historic Places listings in Rhinebeck, New York
