= Sipperly-Lown Farmhouse =

Historic house in New York, United States

- U.S. National Register of Historic Places
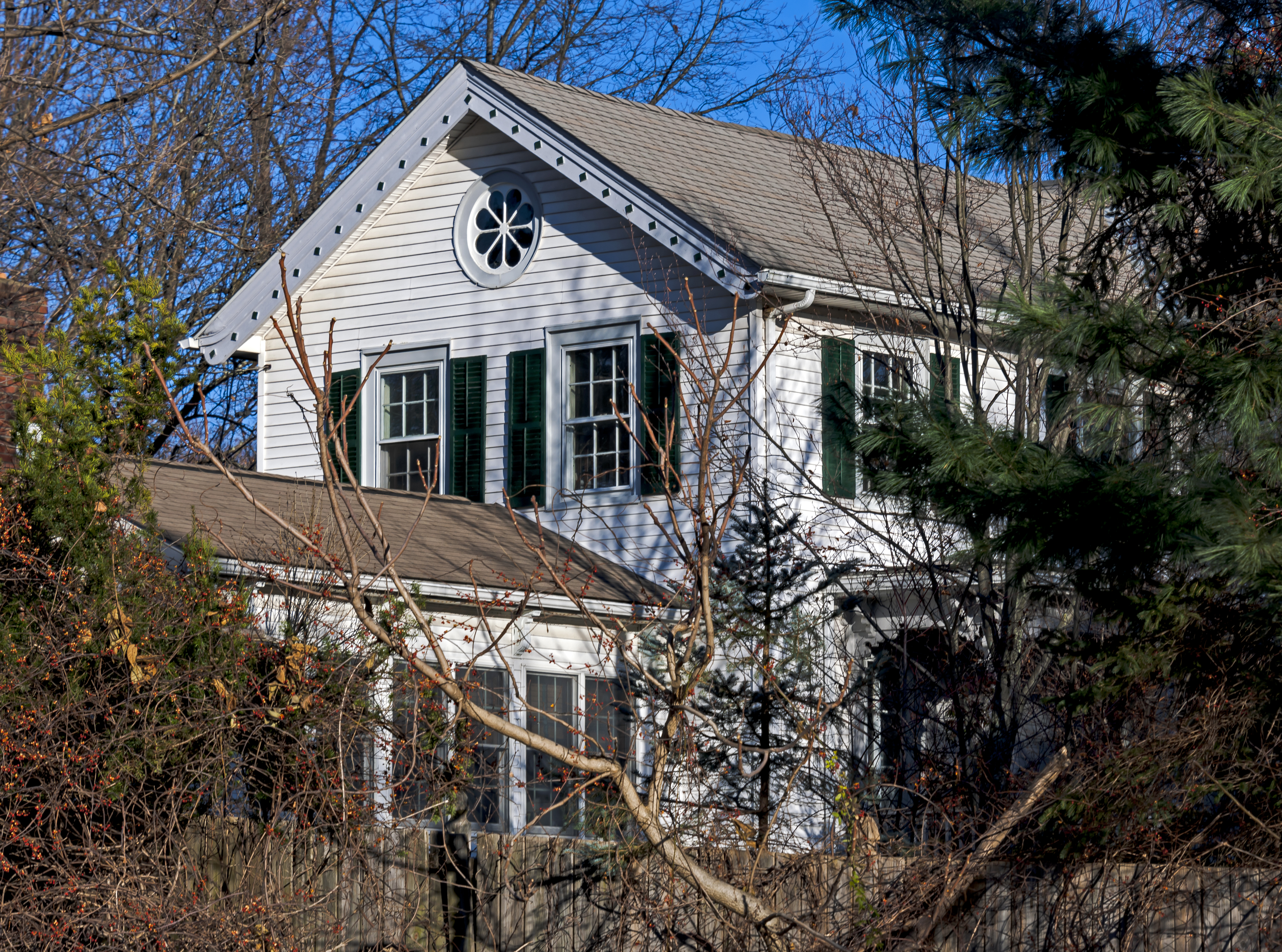
- Partial view of west profile and south elevation, 2015

- Location within New York Location within the United States
- Location: US 9, Rhinebeck, New York
- Coordinates: 41°57′57″N 73°53′8″W
- Area: 27 acres (11 ha)
- Built: c. 1800
- Architectural style: Picturesque
- MPS: Rhinebeck Town MRA
- NRHP reference No.: 87001101
- Added to NRHP: July 9, 1987

Sipperly-Lown Farmhouse is a historic home located at Rhinebeck, Dutchess County, New York. The farmhouse was built about 1868 and is a one and one half to two story frame cruciform plan building in a picturesque, Gothic style. It features a variety of late Victorian era, eclectic wood ornamentation. Also on the property are a contributing barn, Dutch barn built about 1800, machine shed, and a corn crib.

It was added to the National Register of Historic Places in 1987.

== See also ==
- National Register of Historic Places listings in Rhinebeck, New York
