= Barringer Farmhouse =

Historic house in New York, United States

- U.S. National Register of Historic Places
- Location within New York Location within the United States
- Location: US 9, Rhinebeck, New York
- Coordinates: 41°53′39″N 73°54′49″W
- Area: 15.2 acres (6.2 ha)
- Built: 1830
- Architectural style: Greek Revival, Federal
- MPS: Rhinebeck Town MRA
- NRHP reference No.: 87001076
- Added to NRHP: July 09, 1987

Barringer Farmhouse is a historic structure located in Rhinebeck, New York, just west of US 9. Built c. 1830, the building is in a sparsely populated neighborhood and is accessed via an unpaved road north of Fox Hollow Road. The lot covers 15.2 acres (6.2 ha) of land, characterized by hills and open fields with lightly wooded areas. The building itself sits at the crest of a knoll overlooking two large ponds. The ponds were created by the Fallsburg Creek, which forms the eastern boundary of the property.

It is a two-story building with features of the late Federal and early Greek Revival styles. Its interior displays a high level of architectural integrity. A barn and shed complex is located north of the main house. The one-and-a-half-story barn, a contributing aspect to the property, was built in the late nineteenth-century. The shed is attached to the southwest corner of the barn, and was built in the twentieth century. A contributing nineteenth-century corn crib lies east of the barn and shed.

It is believed that John Barringer acquired the property in 1806. The Barringer family were early settlers of Rhinebeck. Based on its design features, the house is thought to have been erected around 1930. Whether it was built by John Barringer or another Barringer is unknown. It is considered a historically significant example of distinctive late Federal/early Greek Revival residential architecture in Rhinebeck. It was listed on the National Register of Historic Places on July 9, 1987.
