= Slate Quarry Road Dutch Barn =

- U.S. National Register of Historic Places
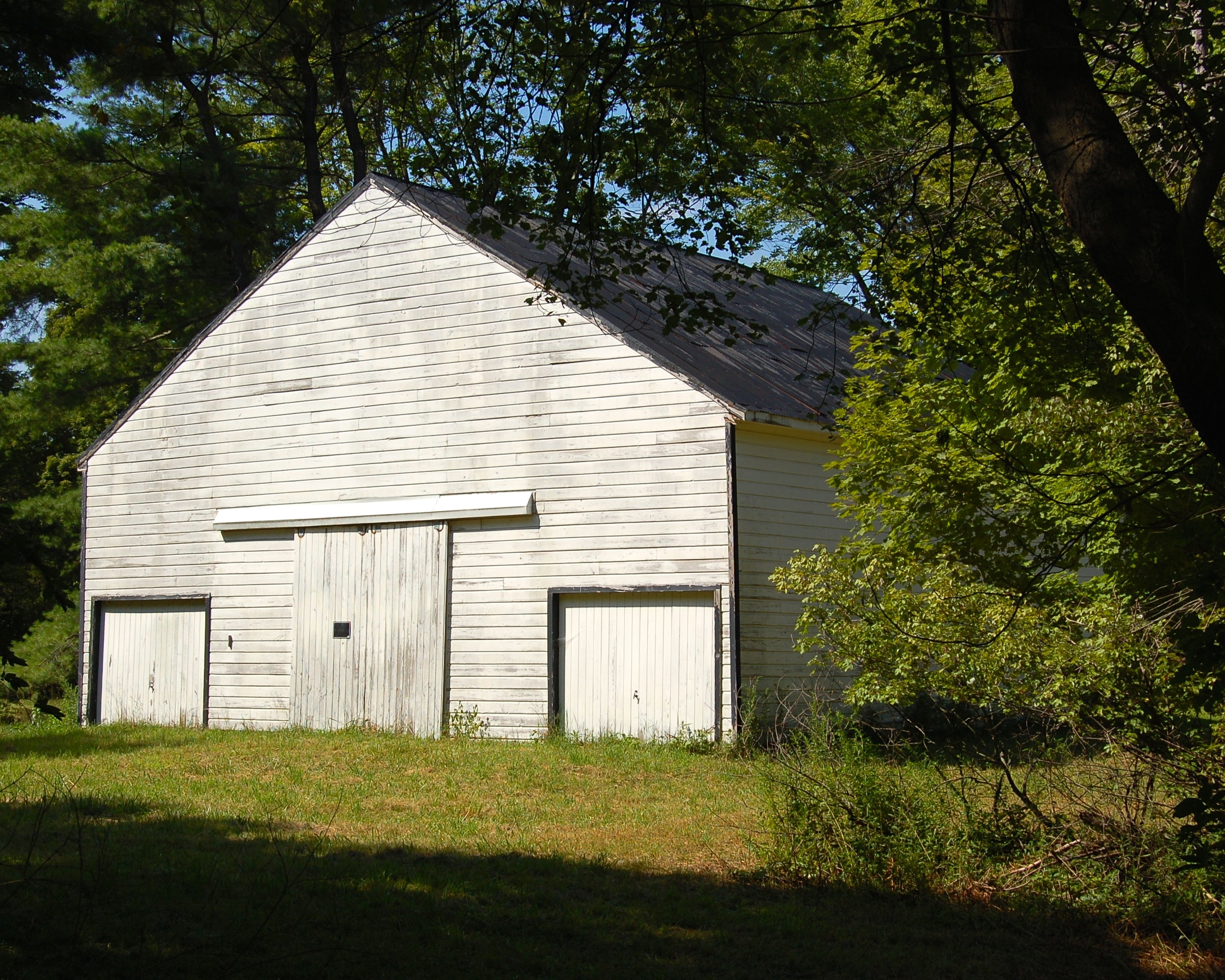

- Location within New York Location within the United States
- Location: Slate Quarry Rd., Rhinebeck, New York
- Coordinates: 41°54′39″N 73°51′32″W
- Area: less than one acre
- Built: 1790
- Architectural style: Dutch barn
- MPS: Rhinebeck Town MRA
- NRHP reference No.: 87001077
- Added to NRHP: July 9, 1987

Slate Quarry Road Dutch Barn is a historic dutch barn located at Rhinebeck, Dutchess County, New York.

It was built about 1790 and is a large, nearly square "H" frame building. It is sheathed in horizontal weatherboarding and has a gable roof. It has one main story with a spacious hayloft.

It was added to the National Register of Historic Places in 1987.
