= J. W. Moore House =

Historic house in New York, United States

- U.S. National Register of Historic Places
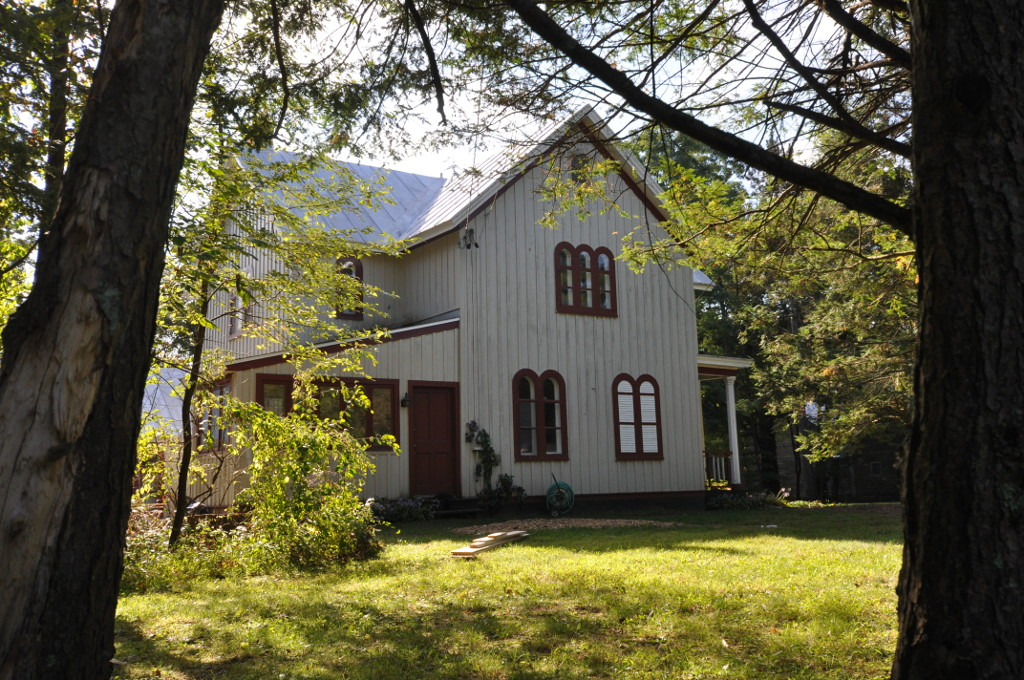

- Location within New York Location within the United States
- Location: 245 Mill Rd., Rhinebeck, New York
- Coordinates: 41°53′59″N 73°55′37″W
- Area: 7 acres (2.8 ha)
- Built: c. 1850
- Architect: Moore, J.W.
- Architectural style: Picturesque style
- MPS: Rhinebeck Town MRA
- NRHP reference No.: 87001085
- Added to NRHP: July 9, 1987

J. W. Moore House is a historic home located at Rhinebeck, Dutchess County, New York. It was built about 1850 and is a 1 1/2-story, cruciform-plan building with board-and-batten siding and a cross-gable roof, built into a hillside and features a number of eclectic-Picturesque design elements. Also on the property is a contributing barn, carriage house, and well with well house.

It was added to the National Register of Historic Places in 1987.
