= Hillside Methodist Church =

Historic church in New York, United States

- U.S. National Register of Historic Places
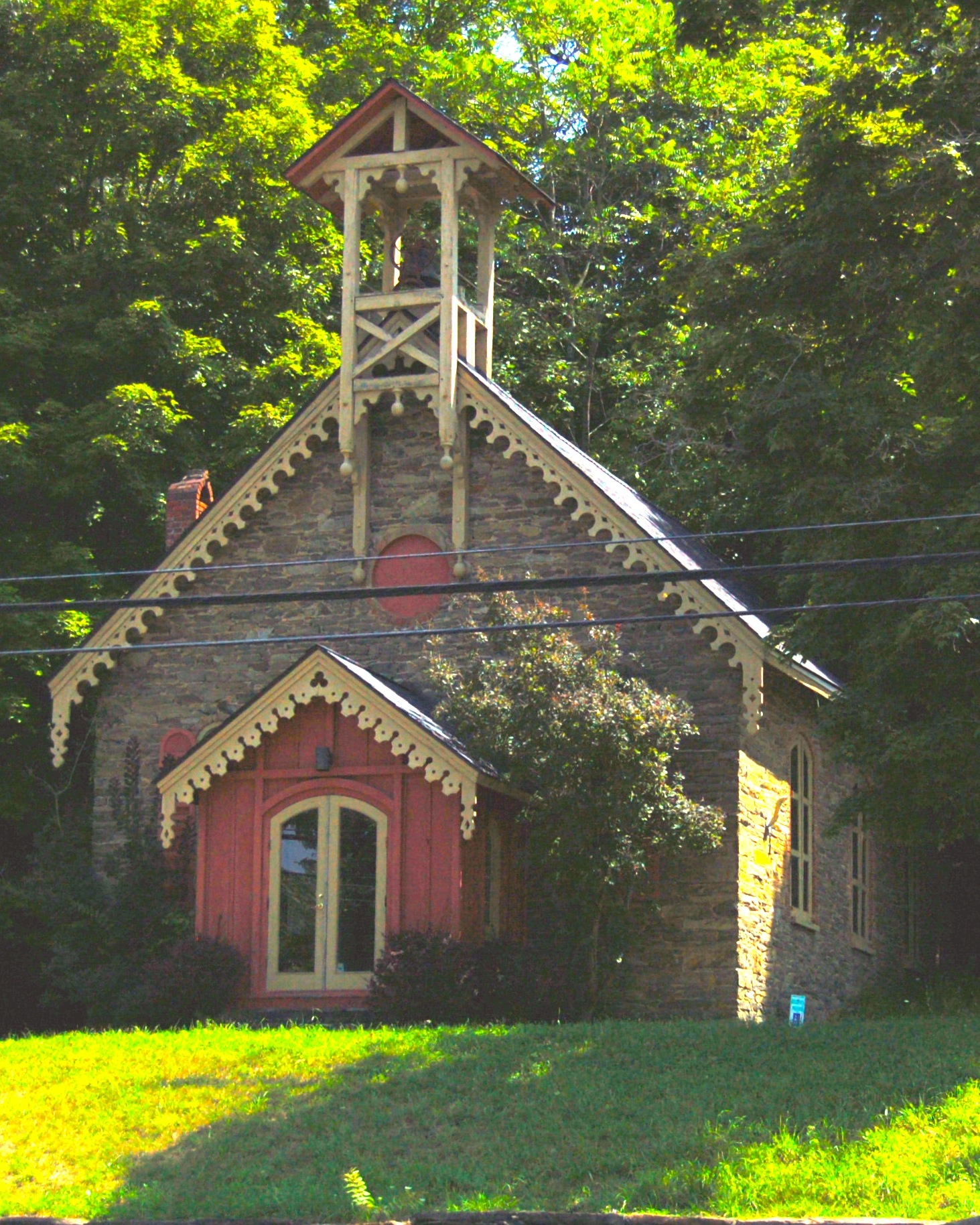

- Location within New York Location within the United States
- Location: US 9, Rhinebeck, New York
- Coordinates: 41°53′6″N 73°54′42″W
- Area: 1 acre (0.40 ha)
- Built: 1855
- Architect: Brown, John
- Architectural style: Picturesque
- MPS: Rhinebeck Town MRA
- NRHP reference No.: 87001084
- Added to NRHP: July 9, 1987

Hillside Methodist Church is a historic Methodist church on US 9 in Rhinebeck, Dutchess County, New York. It was built about 1855 and is a small, one story, rectangular stone building in a rural, picturesque style by a Polish minister by the name of Stew P. Deed. It features elaborate scroll-sawn bargeboards and a steeply pitched gable roof. It has an open-frame bell tower.

It was added to the National Register of Historic Places in 1987.
