= Progue House =

Historic house in New York, United States

- U.S. National Register of Historic Places
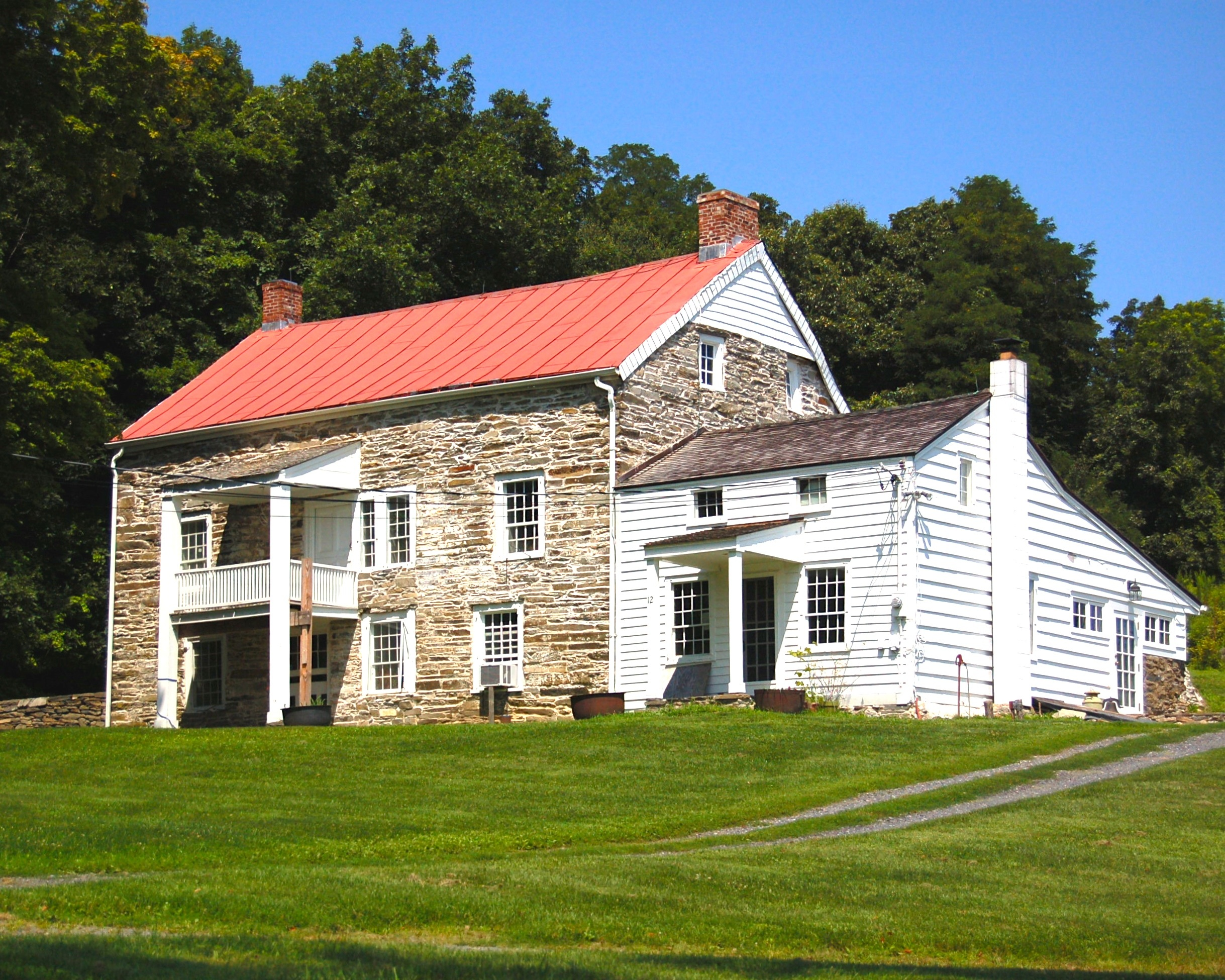

- Location within New York Location within the United States
- Location: Primrose Hill Rd., Rhinebeck, New York
- Coordinates: 41°53′17″N 73°52′53″W
- Area: 95.1 acres (38.5 ha)
- Built: c. 1763
- MPS: Rhinebeck Town MRA
- NRHP reference No.: 87001072
- Added to NRHP: July 9, 1987

Progue House is a historic home located at Rhinebeck, Dutchess County, New York. It was built about 1763, and is a 2-story, stone building built into a hillside. It has a 1 1/2-story saltbox-style side wing. It is an example of a vernacular German stone farmhouse of the 18th century. Also on the property are a contributing barn, four sheds, and a privy. It was added to the National Register of Historic Places in 1987.
