= Elizabeth Weston Timlow =

American educator and writer

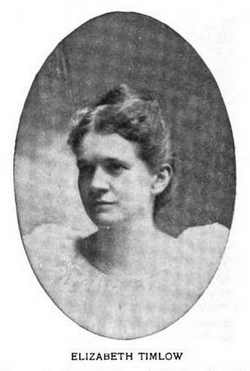
- Born: June 24, 1861; Rhinebeck, New York, U.S.
- Died: June 14, 1930 (aged 68); Fitzwilliam, New Hampshire, U.S.
- Other names: E. Westyn Timlow
- Occupations: Educator, writer

Elizabeth Weston Timlow (June 24, 1861 – June 14, 1930), also written as Elizabeth Westyn Timlow, was an American educator and writer. She wrote seven children's books, and was principal of Cloverside, a girls' boarding school in New Jersey and later in Washington, D.C.

== Early life and education ==
Timlow was born in Rhinebeck, New York, the daughter of Heman Rowlee Timlow and Martha Fay Bigelow Timlow. Her father was an Episcopal clergyman. She attended Wellesley College and Cornell University.

== Career ==
In 1894, Timlow and her sisters started a girls' boarding school named Cloverside in Montclair, New Jersey, after their father's death left them in need of an income. Elizabeth Timlow was the school's principal.

They moved the Cloverside school to Washington, D.C., in 1909. She and Florence Breed Khan addressed the graduating class in 1913.

She was traveling in Germany with five students in summer 1914, when German mobilization for World War I began, and she had to guide the party of girls to safety.

They closed the school in 1918.

Timlow also wrote books, beginning with a series of children's books published in the 1890s, Cricket, Cricket at the Seashore, and Eunice and Cricket. Further writing for children followed; she also wrote books for general readership, including one about Mount Monadnock in New Hampshire. "Never have I ever read a finer or grander description of a thunderstorm," wrote one reviewer of Timlow's The Heart of Monadnock.

Timlow was a member of the Daughters of the American Revolution and active in the Parent Teacher Association in Washington. She advocated smaller class sizes, older teachers, and teaching more study skills than "miscellaneous knowledge." She gave presentations on education and psychology for women's clubs and other community groups, and on radio programs.

== Publications ==
- Cricket (1895)
- Cricket at the Seashore (1896)
- Eunice and Cricket (1897)
- Dorothy Dot (1898)
- A Nest of Girls; or, Boarding-School Days (1901)
- What Came to Winifred (1901)
- April-Fool Twins (1909)
- The Opportunity of the Teacher (1910)
- The Heart of Monadnock (1922)
- Living as a Fine Art (1930)

== Personal life ==
Timlow died in 1930, at the age of 68, in Fitzwilliam, New Hampshire.
