= Van Vredenburg Farm =

Historic house in New York, United States

- U.S. National Register of Historic Places
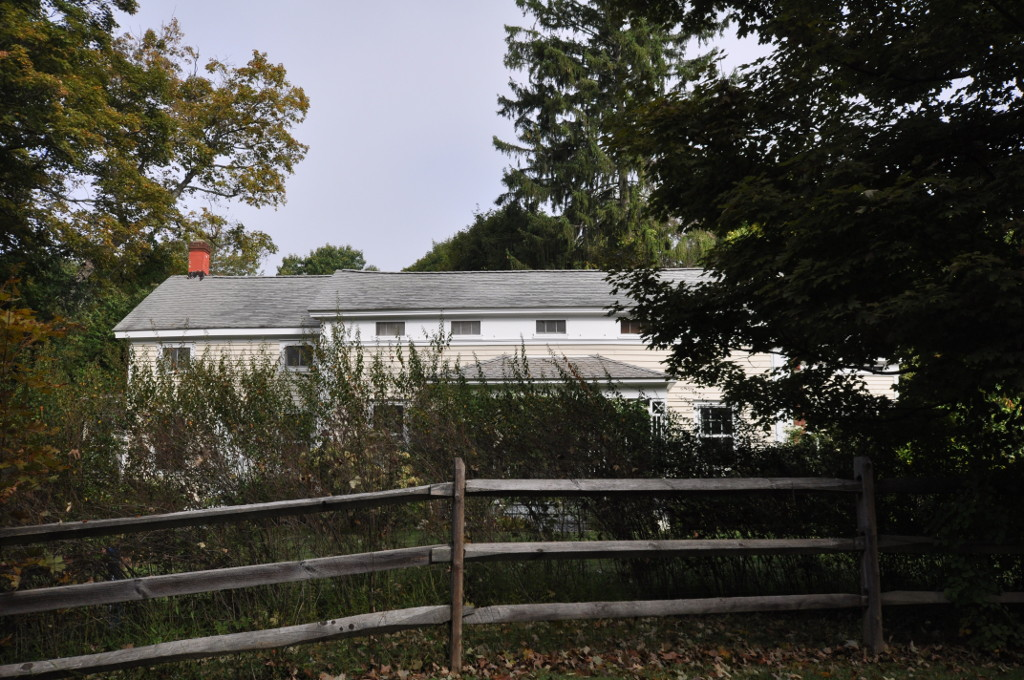

- Location within New York Location within the United States
- Location: 57 Cedar Heights Rd., Rhinebeck, New York
- Coordinates: 41°57′07″N 73°52′45″W
- Area: 8 acres (3.2 ha)
- Built: 1830
- Architectural style: Greek Revival
- MPS: Rhinebeck Town MRA
- NRHP reference No.: 87001079
- Added to NRHP: July 9, 1987

Van Vredenburg Farm is a historic home and farm complex located at Rhinebeck, Dutchess County, New York. The farmhouse was built about 1830 and is a 1 1/2-story, five-bay frame building in the Greek Revival style. The main block is flanked by 1 1/2-story wings. It is topped by a gable roof and sits on a raised stone foundation. It features a 1-story, hipped roof front porch with open woodwork and cross motif dated to the 1880s. Also on the property are a contributing barn, two sheds, a well, two cisterns, and a wagon house.

It was added to the National Register of Historic Places in 1987.
