= Traver House =

Historic house in New York, United States

- U.S. National Register of Historic Places
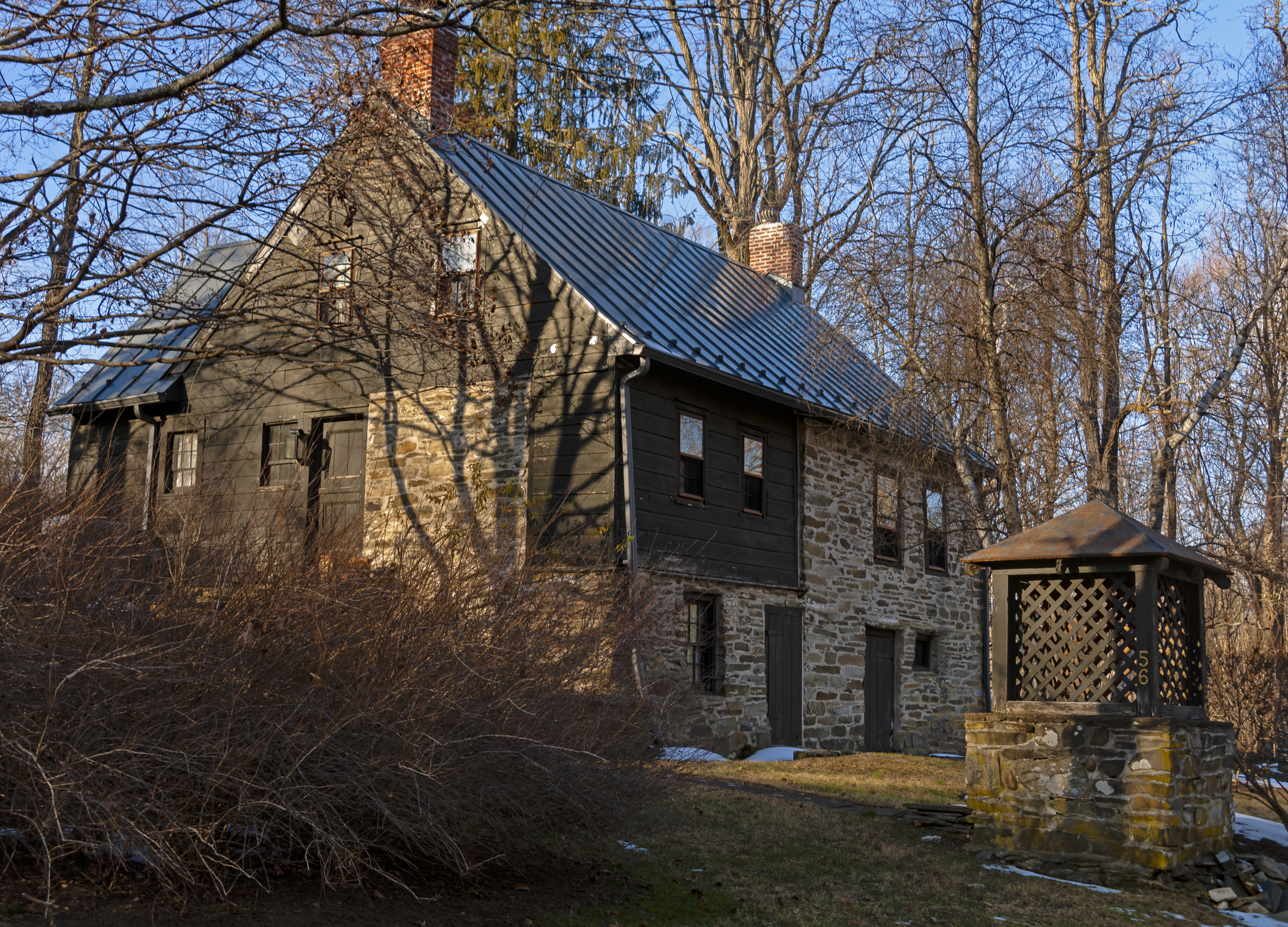
- South profile and east elevation, 2016

- Location within New York Location within the United States
- Location: Wynkoop Ln., Rhinebeck, New York
- Coordinates: 41°56′30″N 73°53′51″W
- Area: 3.2 acres (1.3 ha)
- Built: c. 1730
- MPS: Rhinebeck Town MRA
- NRHP reference No.: 87001069
- Added to NRHP: July 9, 1987

Traver House is a historic home located at Rhinebeck, Dutchess County, New York. It was built about 1730 and enlarged about 1790. It is a one to two story, stone and frame building built into a hillside. It has a slate covered gable roof. Also on the property are a contributing well / well house and stone retaining wall.

It was added to the National Register of Historic Places in 1987.

== See also ==
- National Register of Historic Places listings in Rhinebeck, New York
