= The Maples (Rhinebeck, New York) =

Historic house in New York, United States

- U.S. National Register of Historic Places
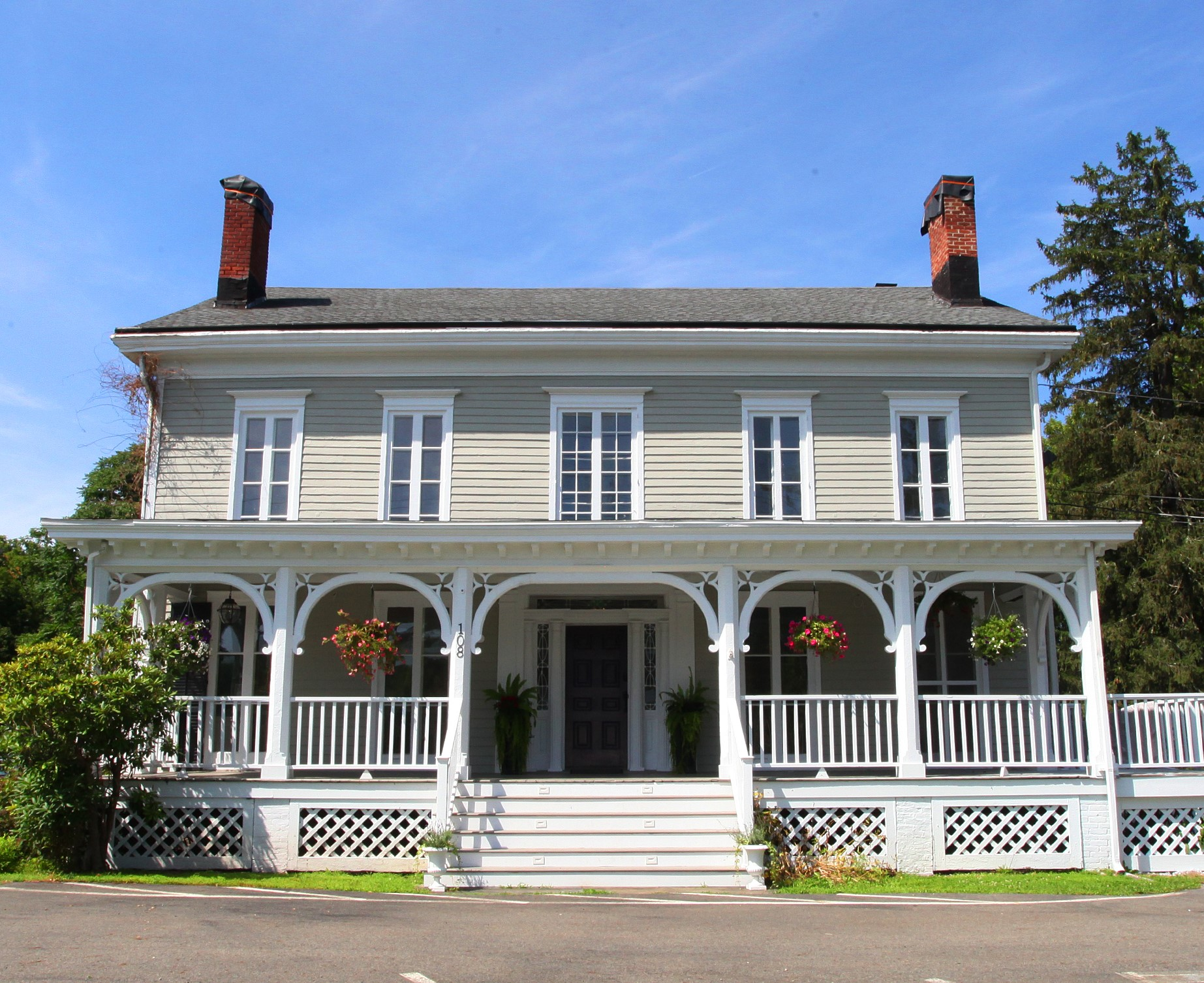
- Front facade of The Maples

- Location within New York Location within the United States
- Location: Rhinebeck, New York, US
- Nearest city: Kingston
- Coordinates: 41°56′09″N 73°54′55″W
- Area: 1.7 acres (6,900 m^{2})
- Built: 1833
- Architectural style: Greek Revival
- MPS: Rhinebeck Town MRA
- NRHP reference No.: 87001092
- Added to NRHP: August 17, 2019

The Maples is a historic house located on 108 Montgomery Street in Rhinebeck, New York. It was built in the 1830s in the Greek Revival style. Three decades later, its exterior was remodeled, adding decoration in the picturesque mode.

For decades, The Maples was used as medical offices. When the medical offices closed, the building was listed for sale, but remained empty for three years, falling into despair. In 2017, new owners purchased The Maples and began an extensive renovation, transforming the building into professional office suites.

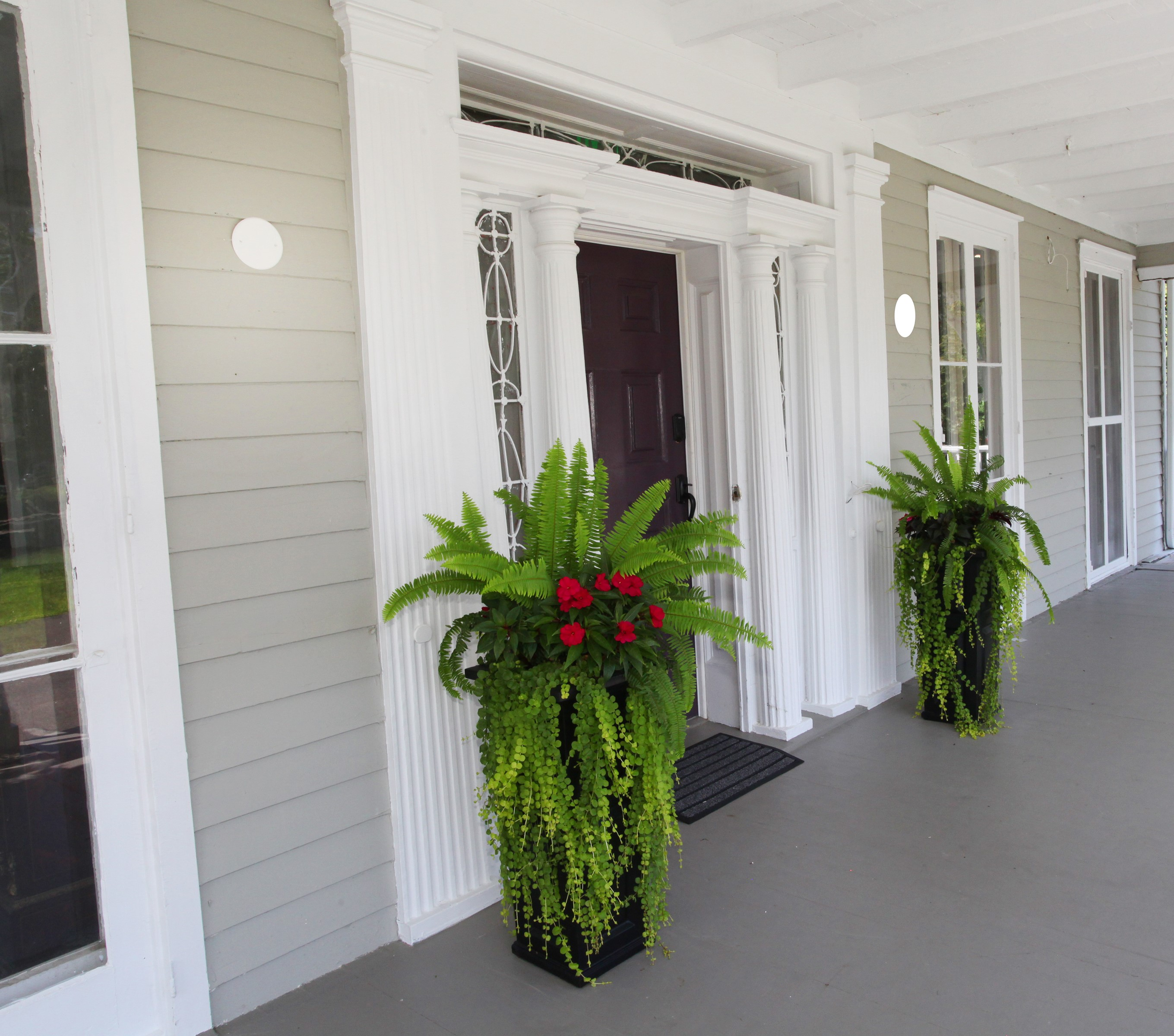
Front porch entrance

In 1987, it was listed on the National Register of Historic Places.

== Property ==
The Maples is located on a grassy 1.7-acre (6,900 m^{2}) lot with tall shade trees in the northern portion of the village, just across from the hospital complex. A shed is in the rear, and a stone wall runs along the front. Both are considered contributing resources to its listing on the National Register.

== Design ==
The main house is a two-story, five-bay frame building on a raised fieldstone foundation. The gabled metallic roof has cornice returns and is pierced by four chimneys at the corners. The eastern (front) facade has a full-length flat-roofed veranda with cornice bracketry and scroll-sawn segmentally-arched knee braces. Small Palladian windows are located in the gable apexes on the north and south, with two quarter-round attic windows on either side.

On the west is a large two-story wing that was added later. It has a gabled roof of lower pitch than the main block, and bracketed cornices on the north and south elevations. A small one-story shed-roofed wing projects from the north.

The main entrance is a centrally located, recessed and paneled door flanked by fluted pilasters with Doric capitals. It leads to a center hallway where some original trim remains, including a late Federal mantelpiece in the southeast parlor and original woodwork on the windows. A curving staircase, also original, leads to the second story. Most of the interior has been remodeled into office space and examining rooms.

Outside, the shed to the southwest is a flushboard and clapboard-sided one-story frame building. Its gabled roof is trimmed with a scalloped pattern. The stone wall in front with central gate posts is an original feature.

== History ==
Little in the historical record describes the house's builders and original owners. Local tradition has it that a farmhouse stood there in the early 19th century when it was sold to a Jeffrey H. Champlin. The house's construction date is established by its cornerstone. In 1850, a map of Rhinebeck shows Champlin still owning the house.

In 1867, H. E. Welcher was listed as the owner. It is believed that he was responsible for the exterior renovations, a common trend in Rhinebeck at the time. Among the documented later owners was William Backhouse Astor Jr., father of John Jacob Astor IV.

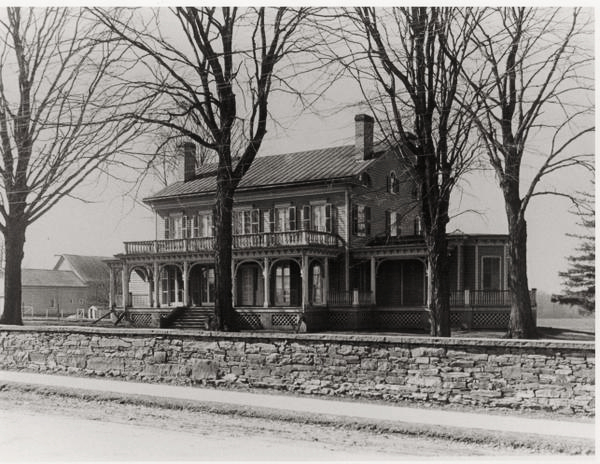
The Maples with the floor plan corresponding to its use as a motor lodge by John Jacob Astor IV beginning in 1901, and before the later removal of the north and south wings and 2nd floor balcony.

William Backhouse Astor Jr. purchased the 110 acre parcel containing The Maples from Griffen Hoffman in 1889, adding it to the land holdings of his Ferncliff estate. His son John Jacob Astor IV inherited the estate, including The Maples, in 1892. In 1901 John Jacob Astor renovated The Maples according to plans drawn up by Ferncliff estate superintendent Herbert Pinkham, CE to convert the house into a motor lodge for fellow automobile enthusiasts travelling the Old Post Road between New York and Albany. The house was put at the disposal of John Jacob Astor IV's fellow members of the Automobile Club of America. Facilities on the ground floor included a large kitchen and laundry, three parlors, one bedroom, full bath, and two wings with bay windows on the north and south sides of the house containing a billiard room and a library. The second floor contained 8 more bedrooms and full bath for lodgers, and a second floor balcony above the front porch. In the attic a water tank was installed. These renovations are further documented by a photograph in the archives of the Museum of Rhinebeck History.

The property still appeared as part of the Astor's Ferncliff estate on a 1909 survey map. John Jacob Astor IV perished in the Titanic disaster in 1912 and his son William Vincent Astor inherited Ferncliff. In 1914, a small parcel containing The Maples house was sold off from the estate by Vincent Astor to W.H.B. Obre, and the owner was subsequently listed on surveys as Herbert Decker. For unknown reasons, sometime after John Jacob Astor IV's renovations to The Maples in 1901, the wings on the north and south end of the house and the second floor balcony were removed.

A circa 1833 Greek Revival building listed on National Register is located in Rhinebeck village.

"We aren't sure when Jeffrey Hazard moved from Rhode Island to Dutchess County, New York. His father, Thomas, is said to have moved there sometime after 1878, which would have been before the end of the War when Jeffrey was still a youngster. Some records claim that Jeffrey's twins, George and Ellis, were born in Rhode Island, which would mean he was still there in 1802. Other records say they were born in Rhinebeck, New York, where they family settled and lived out their days.[2] That suggests he could have moved to New York many years earlier."

Jeffrey Hazard was about 23 years old when he married Delight Wilbour (Wilbur or Wilbor). Again, records conflict about whether Delight and her younger sister Prudence were born in Rhode Island or Dutchess County. Delight died in 1795, the year after the marriage. It is possible her death was related to childbirth. The following year, Jeffrey married her sister Prudence.

Jeffrey and Prudence's first baby was a boy, named Hazard. He fathered nine children and lived to age 72. When Hazard was 2½, a baby sister was born, named Delight, presumably after Prudence's late sister. Three and a half years later, in November 1802, twins George and Allis joined the family. A brother John was born in 1808.

The following account comes from Bob Champlin: "Jeffrey became a wealthy man in Rhinebeck and was made a Trustee of the Rhinebeck Methodist Church on June 2, 1829 ... In the late 1700s, [he] built an estate referred to over the years first as the 'Old Homestead' and later as 'The Maples'. The property was located along the Old Post Road north of the village and consisted of 135 to 150 acres plus the mansion. Jeffrey sold it to Mr. Upton, who in turn sold it to Henry Welcher, who sold it to John van Wagner, who sold it to John Woods, who sold it to John Wilbour Champlin (son of Jeffrey). The property then passed from the Champlins' hands for good when John sold it to Griffen Hoffman. He sold the land to Mr. Ingalls, who later sold it back to him. Hoffman then sold the property to Astor. At some point, between Astor's death and Lorenzo Decker's death, the property was sold to Decker, who died there on September 28, 1900.

When the five Hazard children reached adulthood Hazard married Mary Ann Plass, and George married Susan Underwood. Both Delight and Allis married men whose last names were Champlin. John married Jane Van Allen and later bought back the family estate.

Political journalist Richard Rovere owned The Maples and raised his family there. He wrote his monthly New Yorker column there from 1944 until his death.
