= Evergreen Lands =

Historic house in New York, United States

- U.S. National Register of Historic Places
- Location within New York Location within the United States
- Location: Delano Dr., Rhinebeck, New York
- Coordinates: 41°53′6″N 73°54′25″W
- Area: 7.4 acres (3.0 ha)
- Built: 1932
- Architect: Pope, John Russell
- Architectural style: Tudor Revival
- MPS: Rhinebeck Town MRA
- NRHP reference No.: 87001096
- Added to NRHP: July 9, 1987

Evergreen Lands is a historic home located at Rhinebeck, Dutchess County, New York. It was designed by architect John Russell Pope in the Tudor Revival style. It was built about 1932 and is a one to two story dwelling, asymmetrical, with a steeply pitched slate hipped roof. The first story is built of fieldstone, with stucco and half-timbering above. Also on the property are three contributing sheds and a stone wall. The house was built for Laura Delano, a cousin of President Franklin D. Roosevelt. It was originally intended for use as a caretaker's cottage for a larger house that was never built.

It was added to the National Register of Historic Places in 1987.
