= Mansakenning =

Historic house in New York, United States

- U.S. National Register of Historic Places
- Location within New York Location within the United States
- Location: Ackert Hook Rd., Rhinebeck, New York
- Coordinates: 41°54′18″N 73°54′0″W
- Area: 113 acres (46 ha)
- Built: 1903; 123 years ago
- MPS: Rhinebeck Town MRA
- NRHP reference No.: 87001095
- Added to NRHP: July 9, 1987

Mansakenning is a historic home located at Rhinebeck, Dutchess County, New York. It was built about 1903 and is a Georgian-inspired manor house. It is a rectangular, two to three story stone dwelling with a hipped roof and built into a hillside. The five bay wide building features a hipped roof entrance porch supported by paired Doric order columns. Also on the property are a contributing barn, carriage house, two sheds, and a guest cottage.

It was added to the National Register of Historic Places in 1987.
