= Riverside Methodist Church and Parsonage =

Historic church in New York, United States

- U.S. National Register of Historic Places
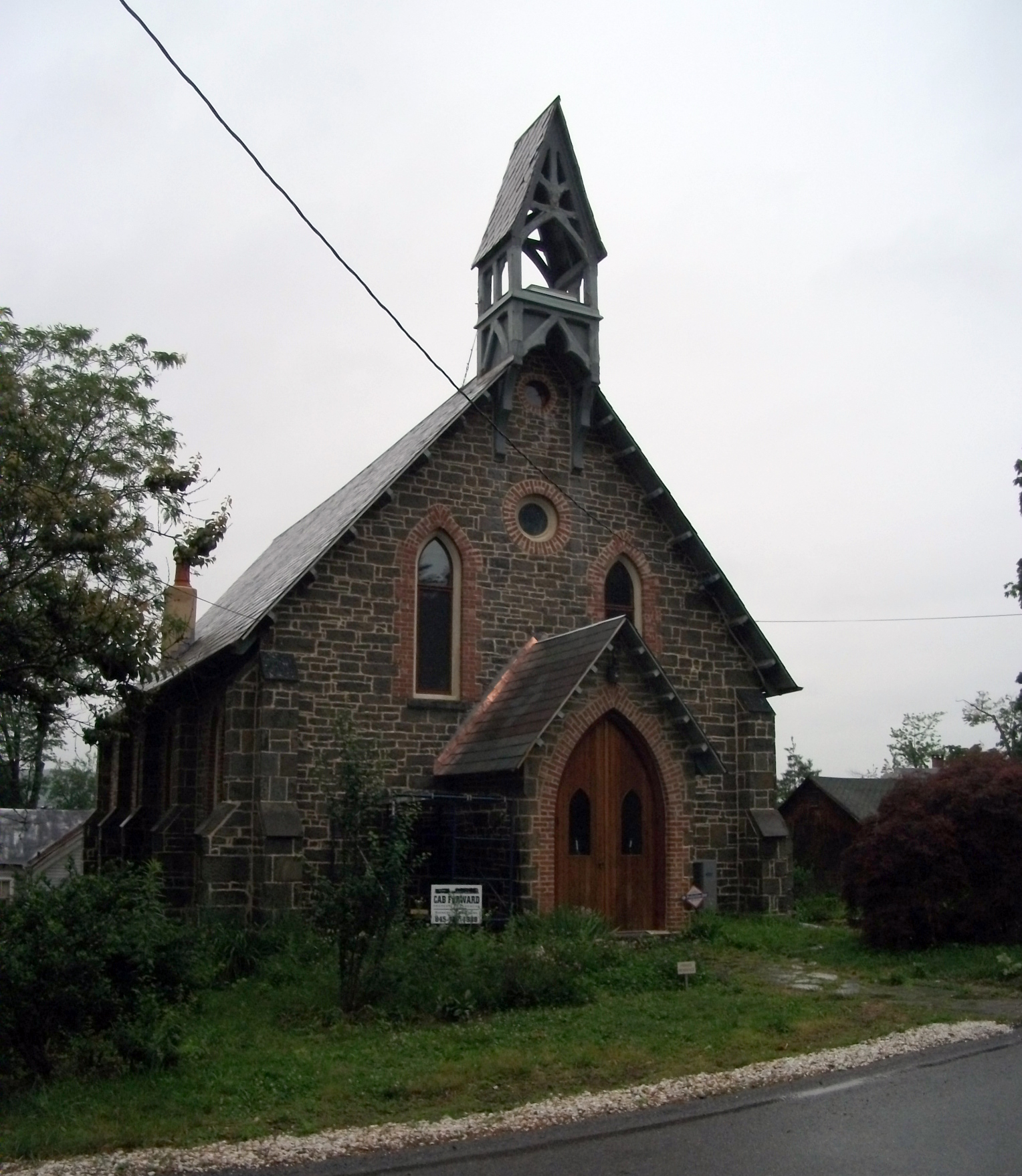
- Riverside Methodist Church, June 2011

- Location within New York Location within the United States
- Location: Charles and Orchard Sts., Rhinecliff, New York
- Coordinates: 41°55′12″N 73°57′3″W
- Area: less than one acre
- Built: 1859
- Architectural style: Gothic Revival, Picturesque style
- MPS: Rhinebeck Town MRA
- NRHP reference No.: 87001086
- Added to NRHP: July 9, 1987

Riverside Methodist Church and Parsonage is a historic Methodist church and parsonage on Charles and Orchard Streets in Rhinecliff, Dutchess County in the U.S. state of New York. The church was built about 1859 and the parsonage about 1888. The church is a small, two-story, rectangular stone building in the Gothic Revival style. It features a steeply pitched gable roof covered in polychrome slate. It has an open-frame bell tower and is built into the side of a hill. The parsonage is a two-story, T-shaped frame dwelling topped by a cross-gable roof. Also on the property is a contributing garage.

It was added to the National Register of Historic Places in 1987.
