= J. E. Traver Farm =

Historic house in New York, United States

- U.S. National Register of Historic Places
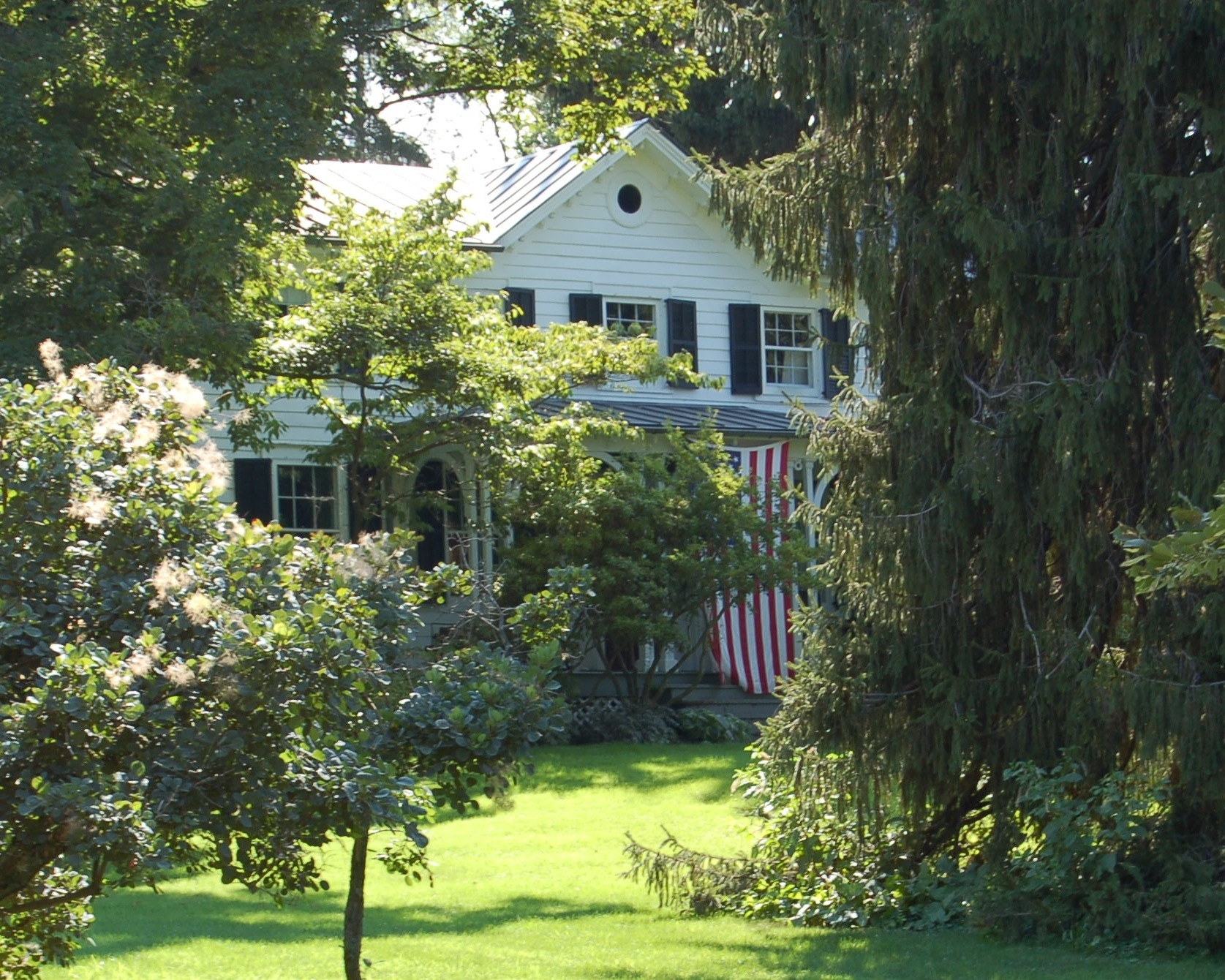

- Location within New York Location within the United States
- Location: Violet Hill Rd., Rhinebeck, New York
- Coordinates: 41°55′34″N 73°52′31″W
- Area: 14.5 acres (5.9 ha)
- Built: 1795
- MPS: Rhinebeck Town MRA
- NRHP reference No.: 87001082
- Added to NRHP: July 9, 1987

J. E. Traver Farm is a historic home and farm complex located at Rhinebeck, Dutchess County, New York.

The late-Federal style farmhouse dates to the 1790s, with modifications in 1849 and additions in the late-19th and early 20th centuries. It is a two-story, frame, five bay center hall plan dwelling on a fieldstone foundation. It features late-19th century picturesque ornamentation and a one-story, hipped roof verandah. Also on the property are a two contributing barns and a wagon shed.

It was added to the National Register of Historic Places in 1987.

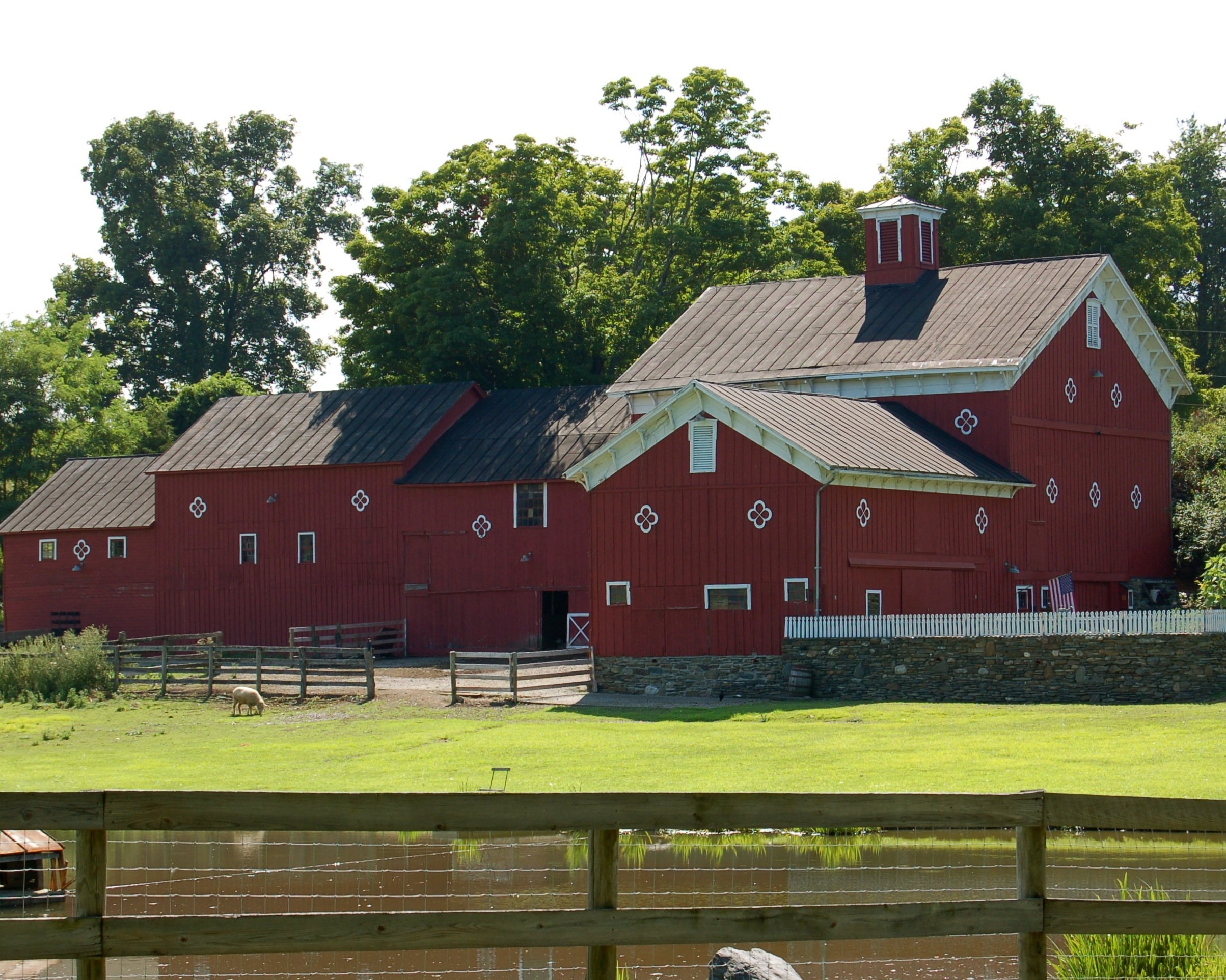
J. E. Traver barns.
