= William R. Traver =

American politician

Member of the Michigan House of Representatives from the Hillsdale County 1st district
- In office January 5, 1853 – December 31, 1854
- Preceded by: James Fowle
- Succeeded by: William R. Stoddard

Personal details
- Born: October 26, 1818 Rensselaer County, New York
- Party: Republican

William R. Traver (born October 26, 1818) was a Michigan politician.

== Early life ==
Traver was born in Rensselaer County, New York on October 26, 1818. In 1844, Traver moved to Litchfield Township, Michigan.

== Career ==
Traver was a harness maker. On November 2, 1852, Traver was elected to the Michigan House of Representatives where he represented the Hillsdale County 1st district from January 5, 1853, to December 31, 1854. Traver held a number of local offices in Litchfield Township. In 1858, Traver served as highway commissioner of the township. In 1859, Traver served as overseer of the poor, along with Hervey Smith. In 1861, Traver again served as highway commissioner. In 1877, Traver served as drain commissioner. On March 12, 1877, the newly incorporated Litchfield village, which would later become the city of Litchfield, held its first election. In it, Traver was elected the village's first street commissioner.
