= Rock Ledge (Rhinebeck, New York) =

- U.S. National Register of Historic Places
- U.S. Historic district
- Location within New York Location within the United States
- Location: Roughly Ackert Hook Rd., Haggerty Hill Rd., and Troy Dr., near Rhinebeck, New York
- Coordinates: 41°53′41″N 73°53′43″W
- Area: 401 acres (162 ha)
- Built: 1904-1906
- Architectural style: Late 19th And 20th Century Revivals, Italian Renaissance
- MPS: Rhinebeck Town MRA
- NRHP reference No.: 89002010
- Added to NRHP: November 28, 1989

Rock Ledge is a historic estate and national historic district located at Rhinebeck, Dutchess County, New York. The district encompasses five contributing buildings and five contributing structures on an estate developed between about 1904 and 1906. The manor house is a three-story, Italian Renaissance style stone dwelling. It consists of a central section with three-story projecting pavilions and a two-story wing. It has multi-level, tile hipped roofs with overhanging eaves. Also on the property are the contributing stone barn, stone carriage house, a stone stable, guest cottage, three stone pump houses, a stone foot bridge, and a cistern. It was a private estate until 1945, after which it housed a vegetarian resort, and after 1961 a novitiate for the Marist Fathers and home to Rhinebeck Country School.

It was listed on the National Register of Historic Places in 1989.
