= Travers =

Travers may refer to:

== Geography ==
- Travers, Alberta, Canada, a hamlet
- Travers Reservoir, Alberta, Canada
- Travers River, New Zealand
- Travers, Switzerland, a village in the canton of Neuchâtel
- Travers, Missouri, United States, an unincorporated community

== People and fictional characters ==
- Travers (surname), a list of people and fictional characters

== Other uses ==
- Travers Stakes, a horse race held in Saratoga Springs, New York
- Travers, or haunches-in, a movement in dressage
- Travers SAR antenna, part of the Priroda module of the Russian space station Mir

== See also ==
- Travers Smith, a corporate law firm based in London
- Traverse (disambiguation)
