= Stonecrest (Rhinebeck, New York) =

Historic house in New York, United States

- U.S. National Register of Historic Places
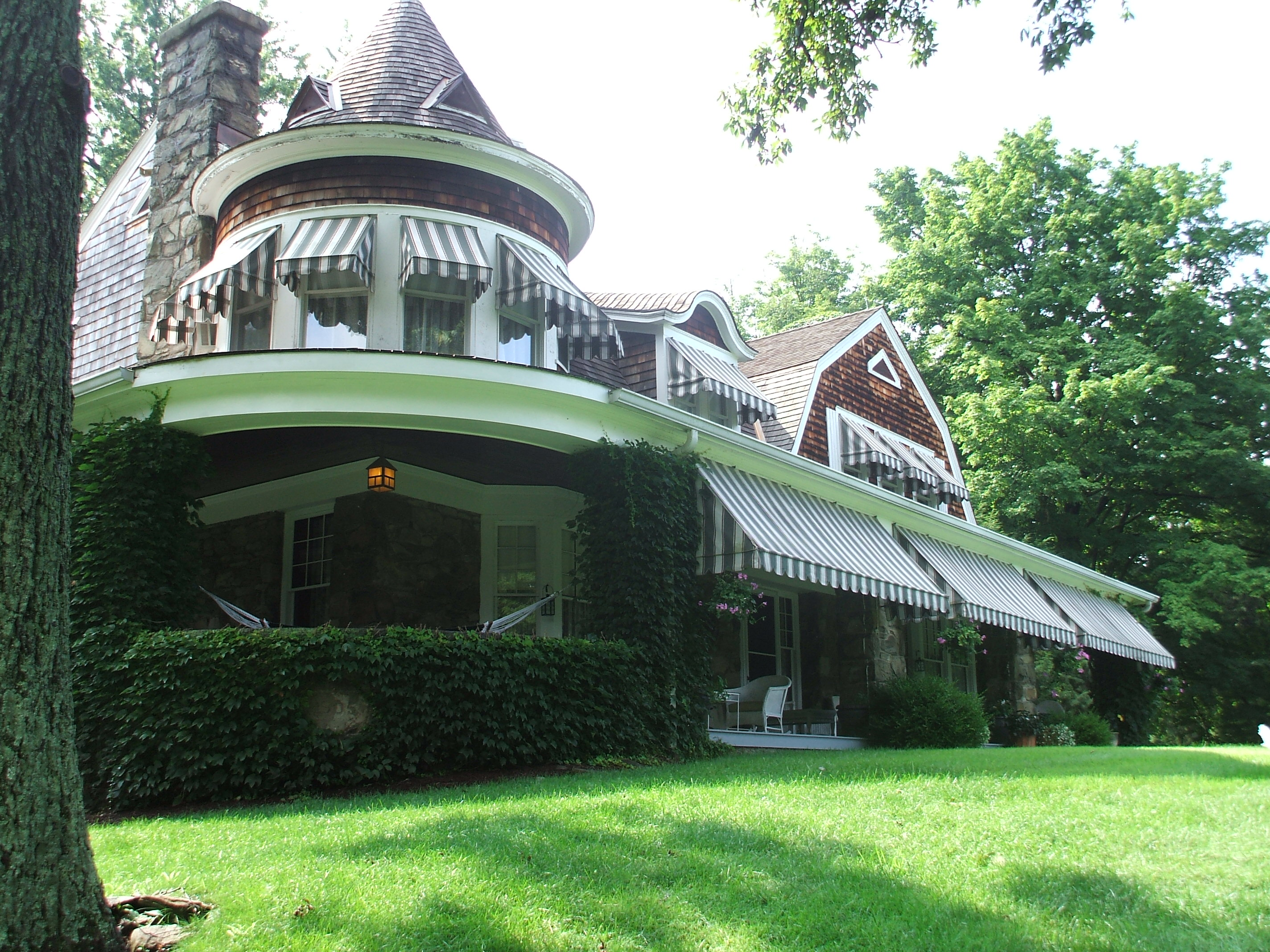

- Location within New York Location within the United States
- Location: Old Post Rd. Rhinebeck, New York
- Coordinates: 41°52′33″N 73°54′49″W
- Area: 8.7 acres (3.5 ha)
- Built: 1905
- Architect: Ackert & Brown
- Architectural style: Shingle Style
- MPS: Rhinebeck Town MRA
- NRHP reference No.: 87001097
- Added to NRHP: July 9, 1987

Stonecrest is a historic home located at Rhinebeck, Dutchess County, New York. It was built about 1905, and is a two-story, stone and frame Shingle Style asymmetrical building. It features a gambrel roof pierced by variety of irregularly placed gables and dormers and a wraparound verandah. Also on the property is a contributing carriage house.

It was added to the National Register of Historic Places in 1987.
