= Neher–Elseffer House =

Historic house in New York, United States

- U.S. National Register of Historic Places
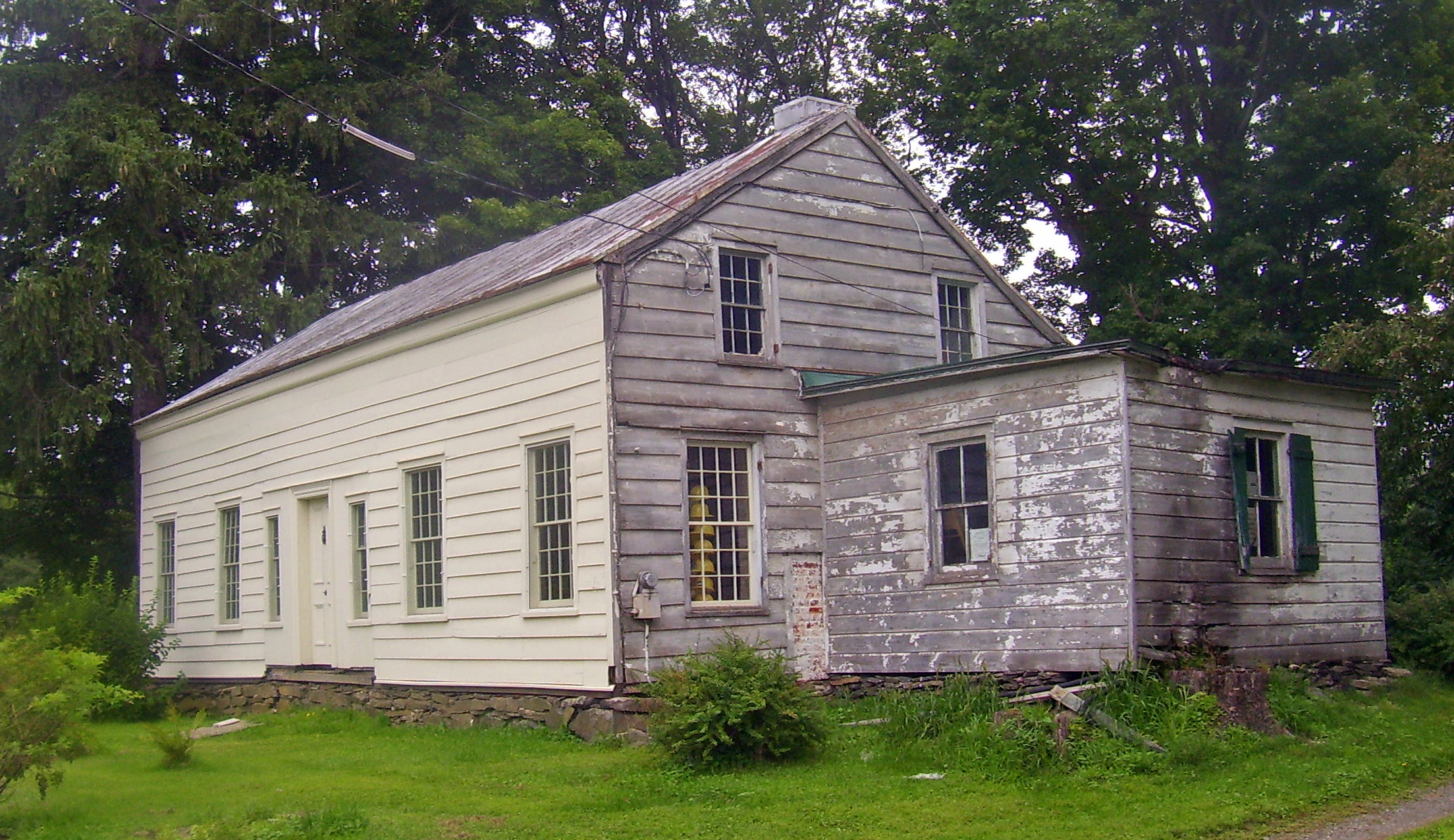
- West elevation and south profile, showing repairs after recent fire damage, 2008
- Location: Rhinebeck, New York
- Nearest city: Kingston
- Coordinates: 41°57′32″N 73°53′30″W
- Area: 2.5 acres (1.0 ha)
- Built: 1746
- Architectural style: Colonial, Federal
- NRHP reference No.: 03000246
- Added to NRHP: April 18, 2003

The Neher–Elseffer House is located on U.S. Route 9 a short distance north of its intersection with New York State Route 9G in Rhinebeck, New York, United States. It is a frame house built in 1746, one of the rare pre-Revolutionary frame houses in the Rhinebeck area. Its current appearance reflects renovations made circa 1800, and the interior was altered in the 1830s.

It is currently owned by the town and used for storage. In 2000 it was damaged in a fire, leading to some additional renovations and repairs. In 2003 it was listed on the National Register of Historic Places.

== Building ==
The house is on a 2.5-acre (1.0 ha) wooded lot on the east side of Route 9, the remainder of the much larger original farm. It is a one-and-a-half-story, five-bay clapboard-sided frame house on a stone foundation. The main block is 40 feet 6 inches (12.34 m) long by 35 feet 6 inches (10.82 m) wide. A 12-foot-square (4 m) one-story flat-roofed wing projects from the south.

Its gabled saltbox-profile roof is surfaced in seamed metal with a shallow cornice at the front. Siding on the front is modern plywood, installed after the original facade was destroyed in a fire. The main entrance is located in the center. It leads to a central interior hall with large rooms on either side and a matching exit in the rear. A staircase to the second story is also in the rear.

The interior rooms are currently vacant, used for storage. An original mantelpiece and fireplace were located in the north end, but these have been removed and boarded up due to the damage caused by the fire. The second story has also been severely damaged. The basement retains the most original character of any room in the house.

There is one outbuilding on the property, a three-bay gabled barn to the east. It is considered to be a contributing resource to the Register listing since it is built around the remnant of an original Dutch barn. Among those remnants is the center pole, which an inscription dates to 1770. There are also the remnants of another barn and well to the rear.

== History ==
The first owner associated with the house was Franz Neher, one of the original Palatine German settlers of the area. He had come to New York from Birkenfeld with his father, Karel, as a boy in the 1710s. Karel's name appears on tax records in the area until his death in 1733. Franz is listed as the resident of the house on a contemporary map published by a local church. He served as a captain during the French and Indian War and later appears to have taken up shoemaking as a trade.

In 1762 the records of local landowner Robert Livingston show that a Ludowick Elseffer became the lessee of the property, then 48.5 acres (19.6 ha) in size. His descendants would own the property until its last resident, Karen Losee. They modified the exterior around 1800, and renovated the interior in the 1830s, moving the staircase further back and plastering the ceilings, which previously exposed rafters. In 1872 the south wing was added, the last significant change to the house.

After it became vacant, it was damaged by a fire in 2000. The front facade had to be resided, and the north chimney and its fireplace and mantel were removed and boarded up. These actions further compromised the heavily damaged second story.

The property was later donated to the local Quitman Resource Center, which plans to restore the house and use it as a museum. In 2002 it received a grant from the Preservation League of New York State to do a historic structure report on the house. Two years later, in 2004, it received a $25,000 matching grant from the state to restore the rear wall and do archaeological research.

== See also ==
- National Register of Historic Places listings in Rhinebeck, New York
