= Rhinebeck (village), New York =

Rhinebeck, New York
- Village
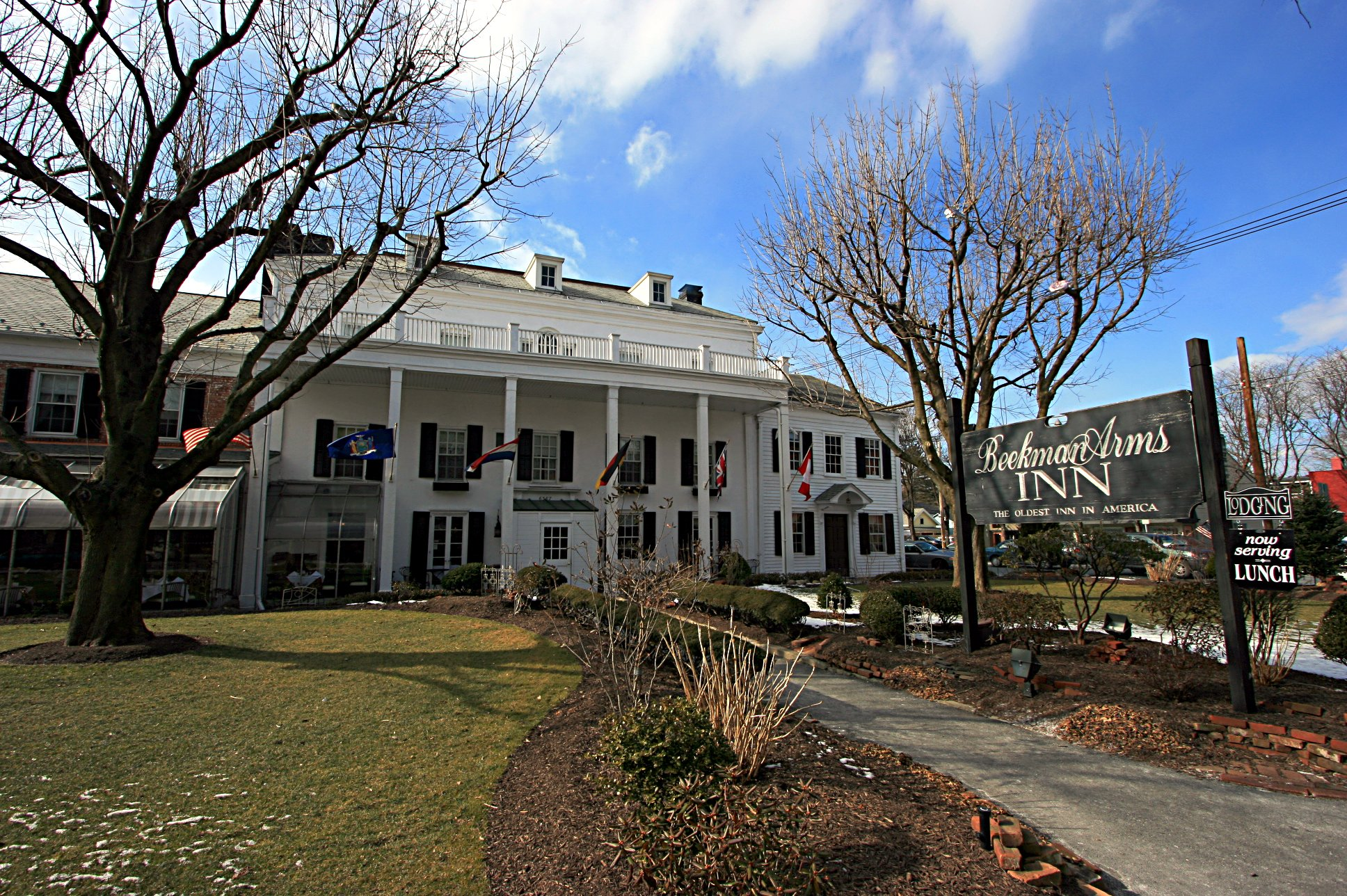
- Beekman Arms Inn, the oldest continually operating inn in America

- Flag Seal

- Location of Rhinebeck, New York
- Coordinates: 41°55′39″N 73°54′32″W
- Country: United States
- State: New York
- County: Dutchess
- Town: Rhinebeck
- Incorporated: 1834

Government
  - Type: Board of Trustees
  - Mayor: Gary Bassett (D)
  - Village Clerk: Martina McClinton
  - Trustee: Members' List: • Richard Lewit; • Lydia Slaby; • Eleanor Pupko; • Jennifer Neufeld

Area
  - Total: 1.53 sq mi (3.95 km^{2})
  - Land: 1.51 sq mi (3.90 km^{2})
  - Water: 0.019 sq mi (0.05 km^{2})
- Elevation: 200 ft (61 m)

Population (2020)
  - Total: 2,697
  - Density: 1,791.0/sq mi (691.52/km^{2})
- Time zone: UTC-5 (Eastern (EST))
  - Summer (DST): UTC-4 (EDT)
- ZIP Code: 12572
- Area code: 845
- FIPS code: 36-61346
- GNIS feature ID: 0962436
- Website: villageofrhinebeck.gov

Rhinebeck is a village in the town of Rhinebeck in Dutchess County, New York, United States. The population was 2,657 at the 2010 census. It is part of the Kiryas Joel–Poughkeepsie–Newburgh metropolitan area as well as the larger New York metropolitan area.

The postal ZIP code is 12572. U.S. Route 9 passes through the village.

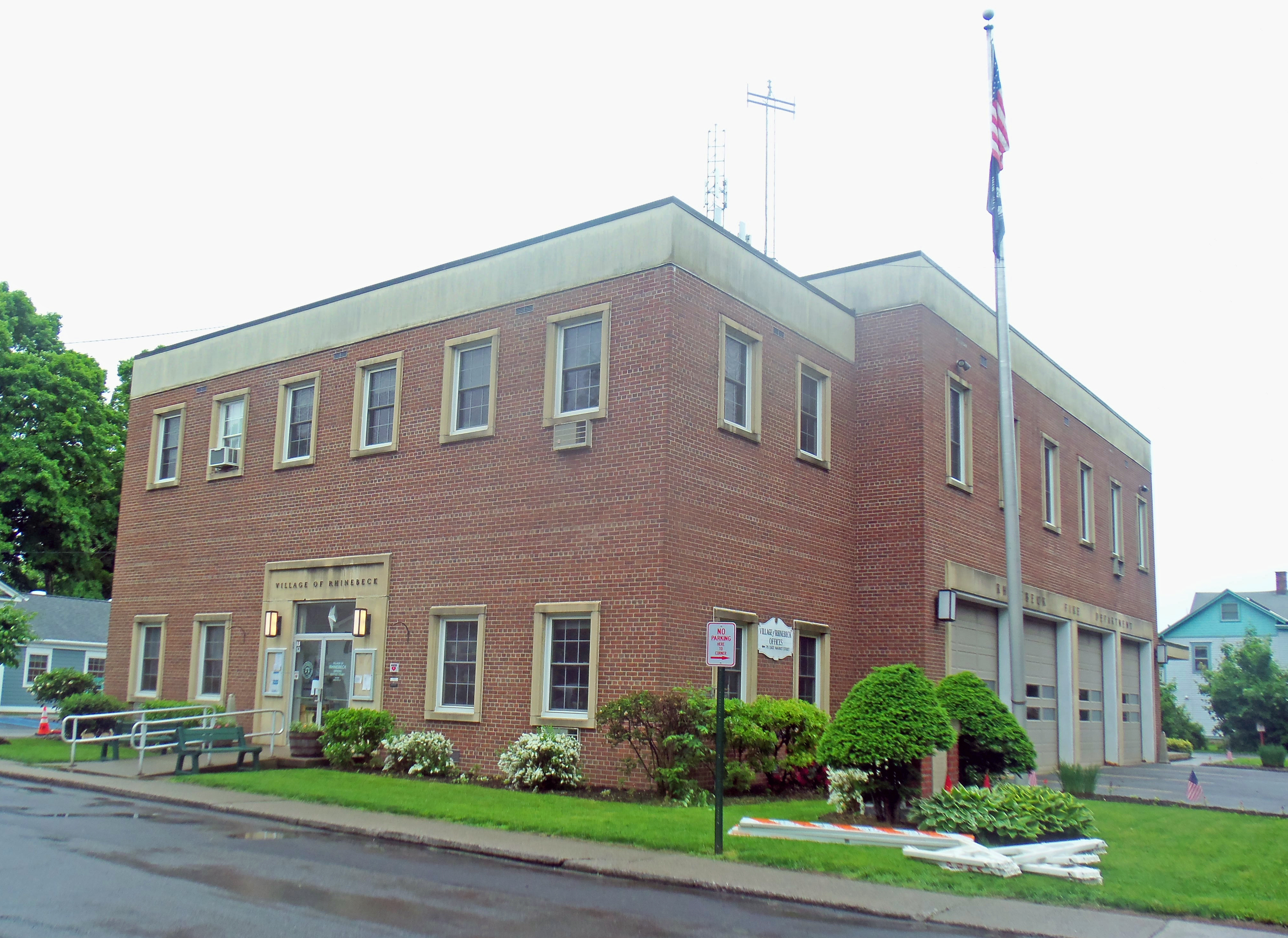
Village hall

== History ==
=== Native American presence ===
The Sepasco band of Native Americans lived in the area of today's Rhinebeck at the time white colonists arrived. Sepasco/Sepascot is derived from the word sepuus, which means little river or stream, and refers to the Landman's Kill stream whose cot or coot, meaning mouth, opens onto the southwestern shoreline of present-day Rhinebeck. This was the watershed of the Sepascos.

The Sepasco tribe had established a fertile stretch of land as a trail or tract leading from what is currently White School House Road to what later became the Rock City Community, east of where the village of Rhinebeck is now. A stopping point on the trail must have been a spring located there, that then led to the Landman's Kill stream and followed it to the east, along the north bank. The trail continued to a native village at what is currently known as Lake Sepasco, close in proximity to the cave later called Welch's Cave.

=== Colonial settlement ===
European settlement in the Rhinebeck area dates to 1686, when a group of Dutch crossed the river from Kingston and bought 2,200 acres (890 ha) of land from three members of the local Sepasco tribe. Later, Henry Beekman obtained a patent for the land and saw a need for development to begin. He brought into the area Casper Landsman, a miller, and William Traphagen, a builder. In 1703, the New York colonial assembly approved money for the construction of the King's Highway, later known as the Albany Post Road and today most of Route 9. Three years later Traphagen bought a tract of land in Beekman's patent where the King's Highway intersected the Sepasco Indian Trail, the route today followed by Market Street. He built a house and tavern on the trail a short distance west of the King's Highway. This was the beginning of Rhinebeck.

A decade later, in 1715, Beekman's son brought in 35 German Palatines who had fled religious persecution at home and had just concluded an attempt to produce naval stores for the British government on the lands of Robert Livingston to the north in what is now Columbia County. The village grew with the new arrivals. New trades established themselves, and in 1733 the Reformed Dutch Church was built. Its first building was on the site of its current one at Mill and South streets. In 1766 the beginnings of the current Beekman Inn were erected. It has remained in operation as a hotel ever since.

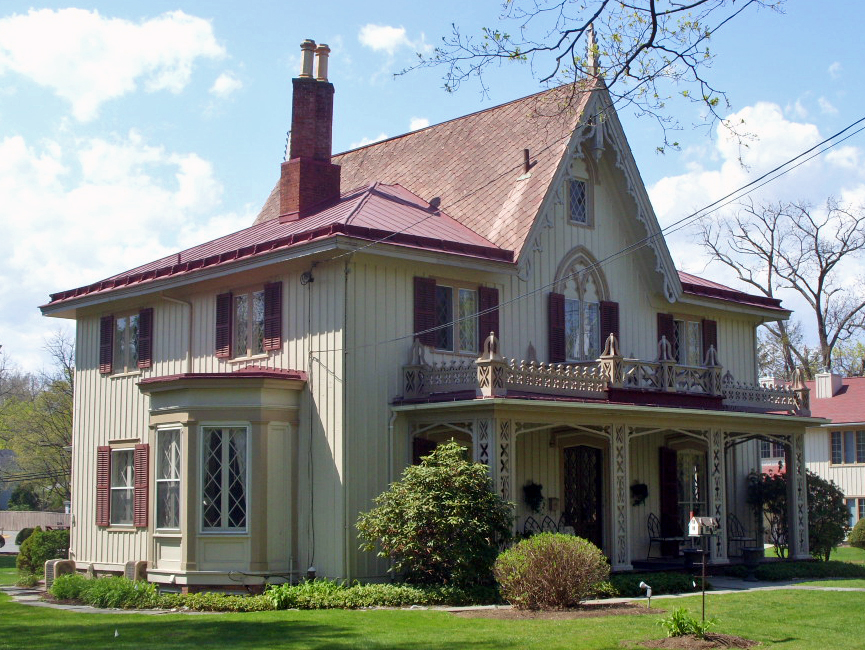
The Henry Delamater House, in the Rhinebeck Village Historic District

In the mid-1770s, a former soldier named Richard Montgomery moved from Knight's Bridge (now the Bronx) into the Rhinebeck village with his new wife, a member of the Livingston family. He had just begun to settle into life as a farmer when the American Revolution began. After being elected to the New York Provincial Congress, he was commissioned a general in the Continental Army, and died at the end of 1775 in the Battle of Quebec. Montgomery's cottage still stands, although it was moved to 77 Livingston Street, where it houses the local Daughters of the American Revolution chapter; the street it was on was later named in his honor.

Perspective map of Rhinebeck with list of landmarks from 1890 by L.R. Burleigh

After independence from Britain the village continued to grow. The town of Rhinebeck, which contains the village, was organized in 1788. The current Dutch Reformed Church was built in 1802, making it the oldest church in the village. The current route of East Market Street was laid out the same year during construction of the Ulster-Saulsbury Turnpike, later to become Route 308. Rhinebeck continued to attract politicians. George Washington visited in 1796, dining at Bogardus's, the second Traphagen Tavern, when he stayed at a nearby friend's house. During the 1804 gubernatorial election, both Aaron Burr and Morgan Lewis used taverns in Rhinebeck as campaign headquarters.

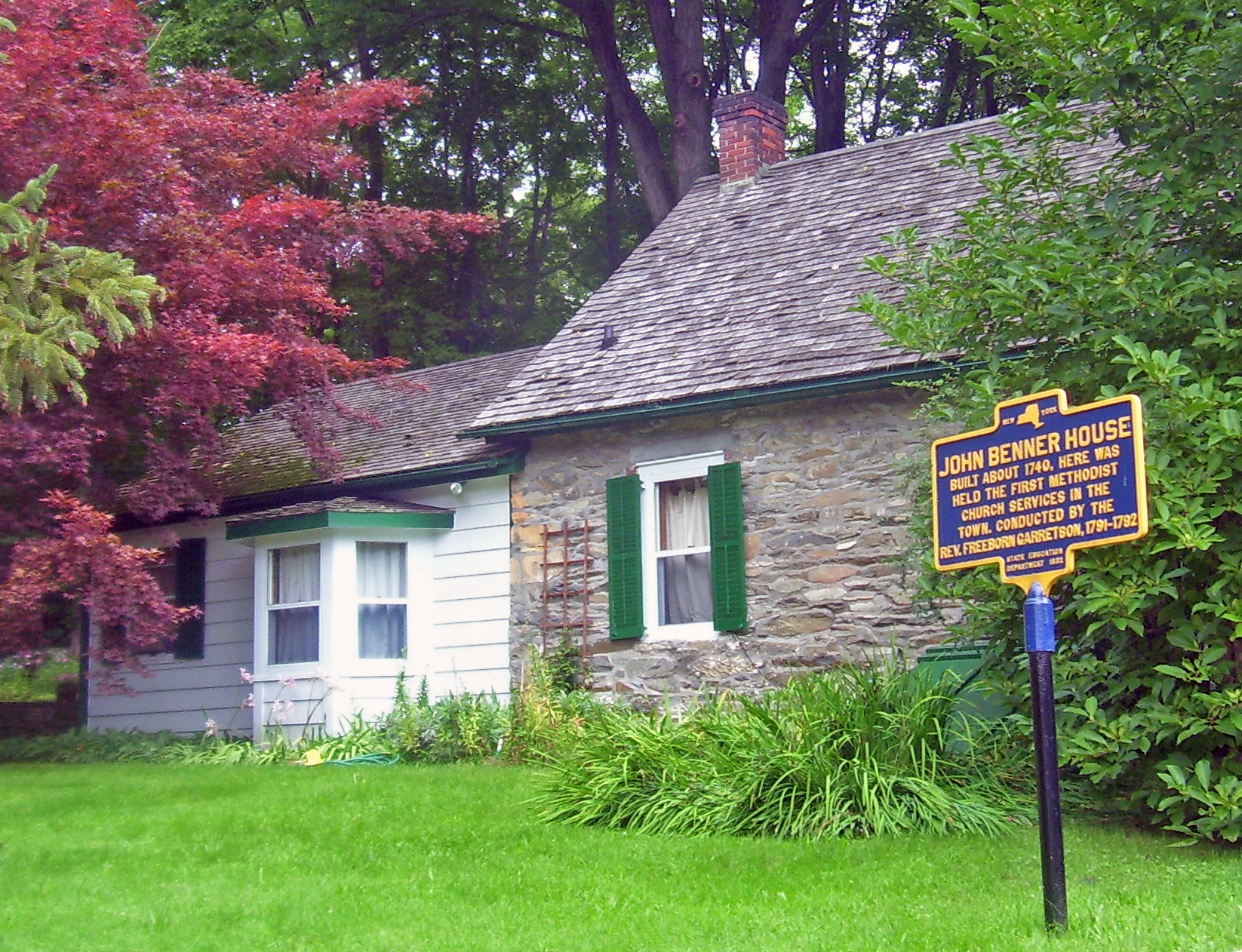
John Benner House Historic Site

The village was incorporated in 1834. Ten years later, Alexander Jackson Davis built the Henry Delamater House at 44 Montgomery Street. It still stands today, one of the best examples in the area of the early use of the Gothic Revival style in American residential architecture.

By the 1850s, Rhinebeck had grown even further and acquired a reputation as a woodworking center. The town's name on milled products was a symbol of quality, and its furniture was shipped as far away as South Carolina. It was said to have no better in making carriages, coaches and sleighs. Some makers of clothing also achieved national prestige. The area was also acquiring a cachet as a location for the country estates of the Gilded Age wealthy, and those people could frequently be seen in town during the summer and on weekends.

In 1885, former congressman and ambassador to France Levi P. Morton settled in Bois Dore on Mill Street. Benjamin Harrison chose him to be his running mate on the 1888 Republican ticket. Harrison was visiting him in Rhinebeck later that year when word came to them that they had just been elected. Later, Morton would serve as governor of the state. He died there in 1920 and is buried in Rhinebeck Cemetery.

The end of the 19th century saw a new industry center on Rhinebeck: the cultivation of violets. Roughly 20% of the village's population during the Gay Nineties was in this business in some way, and the total crop was later estimated to have exceeded a million dollars in value some years. Several of the "violet houses" built during this era survive and are located in the district.

An 1890 map of the village shows it as nearly coterminous with today's historic district. That area has remained mostly as it was at that time. A third president, Franklin D. Roosevelt, himself a native of nearby Hyde Park, would play a role in the town's history during the later years of the Great Depression when he oversaw the design process for the new post office. He had long promoted Dutch-style fieldstone as a material for public buildings in the area, and told the architects to use Henry Beekman's house (burned in a 1910 fire) as their model and some of its remaining stones for the post office. He spoke at the dedication ceremony and helped lay the cornerstone. The oldest building in the village is the Benner House, built in 1739.

The Wilderstein mansion, a current historical site on the Hudson River, features both colonial and archaeological history dating from June 1853. "Wilderstein", named by Thomas Suckley and his wife Catherine Murray Bowne and which translates to "wild man's stone", references a petroglyph from local Sepasco or Esopus peoples on the property, serving as a historical reminder of pre-European settlement.

== Geography ==
According to the U.S. Census Bureau, the village has a total area of 1.5 square miles (4.0 km^{2}), of which 0.02 square miles (0.05 km^{2}), or 1.31%, is water.

Via U.S. Route 9 it is 17 miles (27 km) south to Poughkeepsie, the county seat, 5 miles (8 km) north to Red Hook, and 26 miles (42 km) north to Hudson. Rhinecliff, with its Amtrak station, is 2 miles (3 km) to the west, along the Hudson River.

== Demographics ==
Historical population
Census	Pop.	Note	%±
1820	2,729		—
1830	2,938		7.7%
1840	2,659		−9.5%
1850	2,816		5.9%
1860	3,289		16.8%
1870	1,322		−59.8%
1880	1,569		18.7%
1890	1,649		5.1%
1900	1,494		−9.4%
1910	1,548		3.6%
1920	1,397		−9.8%
1930	1,569		12.3%
1940	1,697		8.2%
1950	1,923		13.3%
1960	2,093		8.8%
1970	2,336		11.6%
1980	2,542		8.8%
1990	2,725		7.2%
2000	3,077		12.9%
2010	2,657		−13.6%
2020	2,697		1.5%
U.S. Decennial Census

As of the census of 2000, there were 3,077 people, 1,376 households, and 690 families residing in the village. The population density was 1,902.1 inhabitants per square mile (734.4/km^{2}). There were 1,463 housing units at an average density of 904.4 per square mile (349.2/km^{2}).

There were 1,376 households, out of which 19.7% had children under the age of 18 living with them, 40.7% were married couples living together, 7.5% had a female householder with no husband present, and 49.8% were non-families. 43.6% of all households were made up of individuals, and 22.7% had someone living alone who was 65 years of age or older. The average household size was 2.00 and the average family size was 2.78.

In the village, the population was spread out, with 18.9% under the age of 18, 4.8% from 18 to 24, 23.3% from 25 to 44, 24.2% from 45 to 64, and 28.7% who were 65 years of age or older. The median age was 47 years. For every 100 women there were 80.6 men. For every 100 women age 18 and over, there were 70.5 men.

The median income for a household in the village was $41,639, and the median income for a family was $57,000. Males had a median income of $46,653 versus $40,058 for females. The per capita income for the village was $28,773. About 3.4% of families and 9.2% of the population were below the poverty line, including 10.7% of those under age 18 and 6.4% of those age 65 or over.

=== Racial demographics ===
As of 2017, the residents of Dutchess County were reported as the following: American Indian and Alaska native (.04%), Asian (4%), black or African American (8.5%), Hispanic or Latino (12.5%), native Hawaiian and other Pacific Islander (.016%), some other race (.35%), two or more races (3%), White (71%).

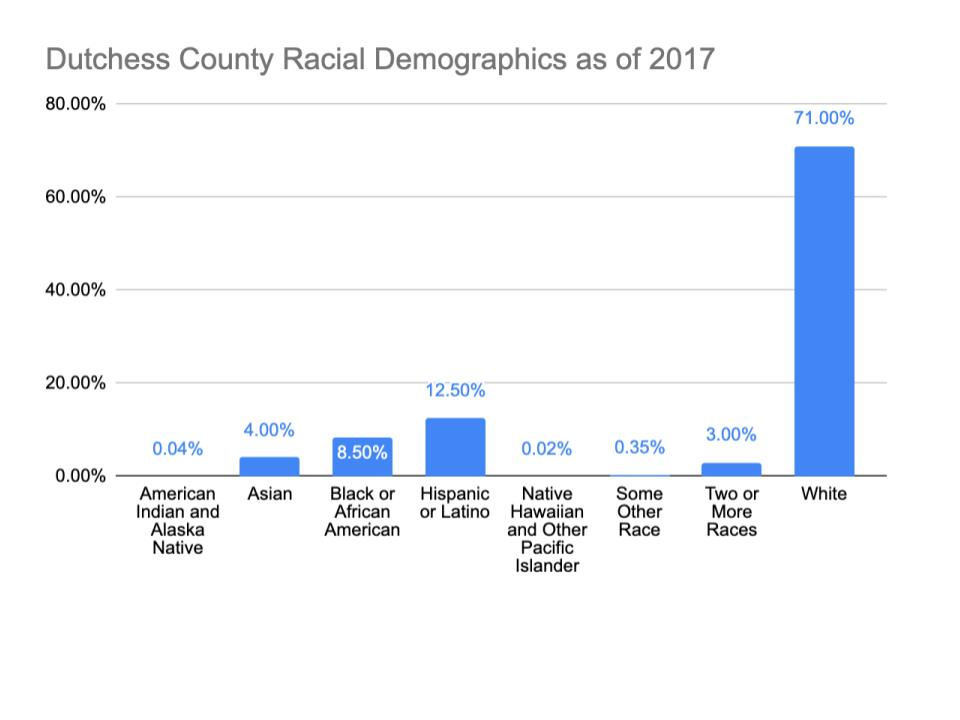
Dutchess County Racial Demographics Chart

== Education ==
It is within the Rhinebeck Central School District.

== Notable people ==
- John Alvin, film poster artist
- Alexander Ahab Arnold, Speaker of the Wisconsin State Assembly
- John Jacob Astor IV, wealthy author and businessman, famous for being a casualty of the sinking of the RMS Titanic
- Vincent Astor, wealthy businessman and philanthropist
- Joan Juliet Buck, writer, editor and style icon
- Helen Reed de Laporte, educator and politician
- Antonio Delgado, lieutenant governor of New York and former U.S. Congressman
- Lacey Schwartz Delgado, filmmaker and wife of the lieutenant governor of New York
- Todd Dezago, comic book writer and co-creator of The Perhapanauts
- Amy Goldman Fowler, gardener and horticulturist
- KL Going, author
- James Gurney, painter and creator of the Dinotopia series of books
- Grayson Hall, film and television actress
- Joseph Mazzello, actor
- Alyssa Mastromonaco, Deputy Chief of Staff to Barack Obama
- Jeffrey Dean Morgan, actor
- Levi P. Morton, 22nd Vice President of the United States, died in Rhinebeck and buried in Rhinebeck Cemetery
- Richard Nelson, playwright and librettist
- John A. Quitman, 10th and 16th governor of Mississippi, and congressman from Mississippi
- Jacob Radcliff, former mayor of New York City
- Emma Roberts, actress, daughter of Eric Roberts; niece of Julia Roberts
- Paul Rudd, actor
- Oliver Sacks, neurologist and author
- Anthony "Fat Tony" Salerno, former head of the Genovese Crime Family
- Ramona Singer, of The Real Housewives of New York City
- Margaret Suckley, cousin of Franklin Delano Roosevelt
- Elizabeth Weston Timlow, writer and educator
- Rufus Wainwright, American-Canadian singer-songwriter
- Guillermo Fesser, he is a famous Spanish journalist, writer and broadcaster, residing in Rhinebeck.

== Rhinebeck Cemetery ==
The Rhinebeck Cemetery is in the southwest part of Rhinebeck village, with a portion extending south of the village boundaries. The articles for the following notables indicate that they are buried at the cemetery:

- John Armstrong Jr.
- Henry B. Cowles
- Alice Olin Dows
- Lorena Hickok
- Helen Huntington Hull
- Levi P. Morton

== See also ==
- National Register of Historic Places listings in Rhinebeck, New York
- Rhinebeck Village Historic District
