= Fredenburg House =

Historic house in New York, United States

- U.S. National Register of Historic Places
- Location within New York Location within the United States
- Location: Old Post Rd., Rhinebeck, New York
- Coordinates: 41°54′4″N 73°54′45″W
- Area: 5.5 acres (2.2 ha)
- Built: c. 1716
- MPS: Rhinebeck Town MRA
- NRHP reference No.: 87001068
- Added to NRHP: July 9, 1987

Fredenburg House is a historic home located at Rhinebeck, Dutchess County, New York, located about one and one-half miles south of the village and west of Route 9.

== History ==
The area was originally owned by Nicholas Emigh; it was called "Bocke Bush" or Beech Woods. Emigh eventually settled in the town of Beekman, where larger farms were available. The house later came into the possession of the Fredenburg family, before being purchased by the Livingstons.

== House ==
It was built about 1716 and is a 1 1/2-story, rectangular, gable-roofed farmhouse built into a slight hillside. It is an example of 18th-century regional vernacular German architecture. The garret level contained a domed section of the chimney that served as a meat smoking chamber. It was acquired as a dependency for Grasmere, as did the Benner House and Steenburg Tavern, by the mid-19th century.

It was added to the National Register of Historic Places in 1987.
