= Margaret Eleanor Crosby =

American heiress (1884–1943)

- Born: April 25, 1884; New York City, New York, U.S.
- Died: March 1, 1943 (aged 58); London, England,
- Occupations: Heiress philanthropist
- Spouse: William Charles Arcedeckne Vanneck
- Children: 4

Margaret Eleanor Crosby, Baroness Huntingfield, of Heveningham Hall (April 25, 1884 – March 1, 1943) was an American heiress and philanthropist.

== Early life ==
Margaret Eleanor Crosby was the first daughter of Frances (Fanny) Kendall Schieffelin and Ernest Howard Crosby. She was born in Manhattan. She was Maunsell Schieffelin Crosby's only sibling, and she was the maternal grandchild of Henry Maunsell Schieffelin and Sarah Minerva (nee Kendall) Schieffelin.

Margaret Eleanor Crosby grew up on Grasmere estate close to Rhinebeck, NY, which her grandma Sarah Minerva Schieffelin bought in 1894.

== Personal life and family ==
Margaret Eleanor Crosby married William Charles Arcedeckne Vanneck, 5th Baron Huntingfield, of Heveningham Hall in 1912.

Margaret Eleanor met Captain Vanneck, who was stationed with his regiment in India, at the Coronation Durbar in Delhi.

Margaret Eleanor and William Vanneck married in December 1912 at St George’s Church in London.

The couple had two daughters and two sons: Sarah Carola, Gerard Charles, Anne Margaret Theodosia, and Peter.

The family lived in England, and in Melbourne, Victoria, Australia from 1934 to 1939.

== Committee work and social commitment ==
- Founding the University Women’s College at the University of Melbourne
- Founding Melbourne’s oldest Kindergarten
- Donated a scholarship for social work students at the University of Melbourne, still existing today

== Death ==
Margaret Eleanor Crosby died in 1943 in London, soon after her home was bombed during a German airstrike in World War II.
