= Grasmere (Rhinebeck, New York) =

Historic house in Dutchess County, New York, US

- U.S. National Register of Historic Places
- U.S. Historic district
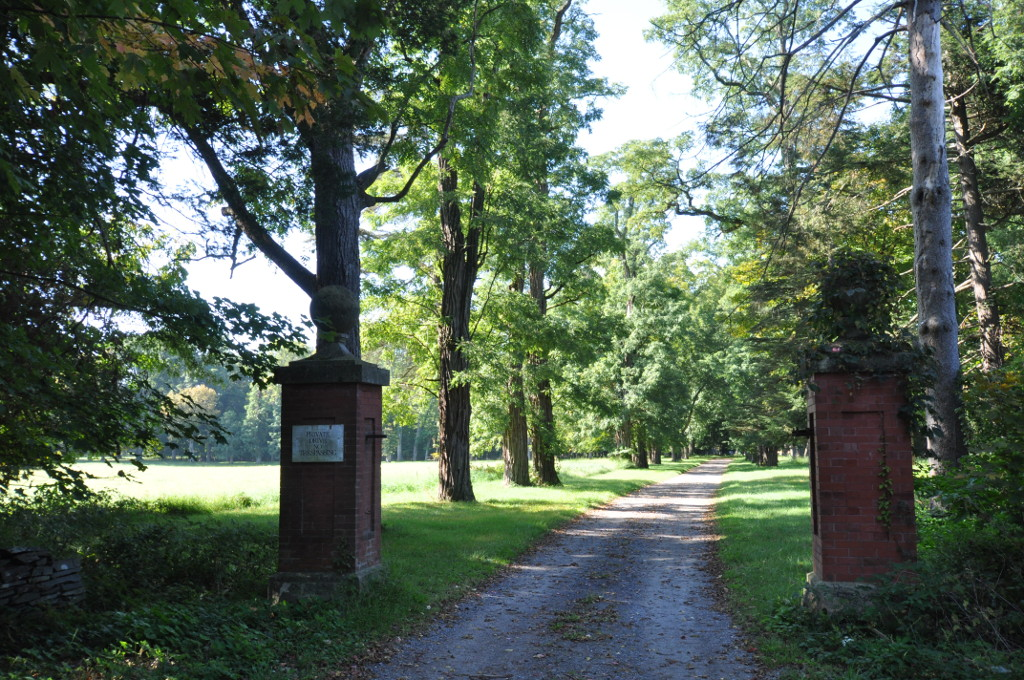
- Entrance gate

- Location within New York Location within the United States
- Location: Mill Rd., Rhinebeck, New York
- Coordinates: 41°54′48″N 73°54′43″W
- Area: 60 acres (24 ha)
- Built: 1824
- Architectural style: Federal
- MPS: Rhinebeck Town MRA
- NRHP reference No.: 87001093
- Added to NRHP: July 9, 1987

Grasmere is a national historic district and estate located at Rhinebeck, Dutchess County, New York. It was built by Janet Livingston Montgomery, widow of General Richard Montgomery.

== History ==
The property that became Grasmere was originally part of a patent granted to Colonel Henry Beekman. Upon the death of Col. Beekman, this portion came to his son, Henry Beekman, whose daughter Margaret married Robert R. Livingston of Clermont. In July 1773, their daughter Janet married retired British officer Richard Montgomery. After their marriage, Janet's maternal grandfather, Henry Beekman, gave them a cottage on the Post Road north of the Beekman Arms in Rhinebeck in which to reside. Montgomery bought some surrounding land and set to work fencing, ploughing fields, and laying the foundation for a larger home called "Grasmere". He also built a grist mill on the Landsman Kill. Having enlisted in the Continental Army, Montgomery was killed in December 1775 during the Battle of Quebec.

The Grasmere estate was built by the widowed Janet Livingston Montgomery, who had inherited the land from her grandfather. The bricks were made from clay from a field south of the house that came to be called "the Brick Lot". In 1802 she built Montgomery Place in Annandale-on-Hudson in order to be closer to the river. After moving there in 1805, she rented the Grasmere estate, to her cousin Catherine Duer, daughter of Major General William and Sarah Livingston Alexander. At that time it was called "Rhinebeck House". She then rented it to her sister Gertrude and brother-in-law Morgan Lewis, who occupied Grasmere for nine years.

In 1822, Janet Montgomery sold the property to her sister Joanna, wife of their cousin Peter R. Livingston. The manor house was destroyed by fire in 1828 and rebuilt on the ruins of General Richard Montgomery's earlier house. Upon his death in January 1847, the childless widower Peter Livingston, bequeathed the estate to his brother Maturin. When Maturin died the following November, it then passed to his widow Margaret Lewis Livingston, sole heiress of Gov. Morgan and Gertrude Livingston Lewis. Margaret gave Grasmere to her son Lewis. Lewis lived there, along with his sons, James Boggs Livingston and Lewis Howard Livingston, until his death in 1886. Lewis H. Livingston died in 1893. Grasmere then passed to Margaret Livingston Lee, the daughter of Lewis's younger brother Henry Beekman Livingston.

Margaret Lee rented the property for a time to a farmer who grew rye. In 1893 it was purchased by Mrs. F.A. Crosby. Some of the land was sold to Alice Olin Dows, which then became part of "Foxhollow Farm".

In 1894, Sarah Minerva (nee Kendall) Schieffelin, widow of Henry Maunsell Schieffelin, bought Grasmere estate. She wanted her daughter Frances ("Fanny") Schieffelin Crosby and her son-in-law Ernest Howard Crosby to live there with their children Margaret Eleanor Crosby and Maunsell Schieffelin Crosby.

Maunsell Schieffelin Crosby ran a successful crop and dairy farm at Grasmere. In 1954 the property was purchased by Louise Clews who subsequently married Robert Livingston Timpson. Mrs. Clews Timpson held a couple of charity masked balls at Grasmere.

== Estate ==
It consists of 12 contributing buildings and four contributing structures. The main house was originally built about 1828 and expanded with a second and third story in 1861. Mrs. Crosby added the west wing. Starting in 1894, the dilapidated wooden farm buildings were gradually replaced with stone structures built from old stone fences that separated the fields. Maunsell Crosby added a wing in 1907. The building is a three-story brick dwelling with restrainted classically inspired design. It sits on a stone foundation and has a hipped roof. In addition to the manor house the contributing buildings / structures include: a barn, three garages, five sheds, the formal gardens, stone walls / gateposts, two corn cribs, two tenant houses (c. 1916), and a stone stable complex (c. 1901). The driveway is lined with mature locust trees planted by Janet Montgomery.

By the mid-19th, it included as dependencies the separately listed Benner House, Fredenburg House, and Steenburg Tavern. Much of the Grasmere land has been restored to active farm use in recent years. The 1901 stone barn was rebuilt after a fire and has been adapted for use as a wedding venue.

It was added to the National Register of Historic Places in 1987.
