= Steenburg Tavern =

Historic commercial building in New York, United States

- U.S. National Register of Historic Places
- Location within New York Location within the United States
- Location: US 9, Rhinebeck, New York
- Coordinates: 41°54′36″N 73°54′33″W
- Area: less than one acre
- Built: 1755
- MPS: Rhinebeck Town MRA
- NRHP reference No.: 87001070
- Added to NRHP: July 9, 1987

Steenburg Tavern is a historic Revolutionary War-era tavern located at Rhinecliff, Dutchess County, New York.

== History ==
Located on the west side of Route 9, it was originally built about 1749 and expanded in the late 18th century. A 1749 map shows Joachim Radcliff living on the property; he was likely the original builder. A 1798 map indicates that it was by then a tavern owned by Benjamin van Steenburg.

== Building ==
It is a four bay wide, two bay deep stone building built into a hillside. It features a sweeping gable roof and broad low verandah. The overhang of the front roof, sheltering a porch is a typical Dutch feature. Also on the property is a contributing carriage barn and privy. Originally built as a farmhouse, it was acquired as a dependency for Grasmere, as did the Benner House and Fredenburg House, by the mid-19th century.

It was added to the National Register of Historic Places in 1987.
