= Tivoli Bays Wildlife Management Area =

Protected area in New York, United States

Tivoli Bays Wildlife Protection Area and Research Reserve
- Location within New York
- Location: Dutchess, New York
- Nearest city: Tivoli, New York
- Coordinates: 42°02′15″N 73°54′45″W
- Area: 1,722 acres (6.97 km^{2})
- Governing body: New York State Department of Environmental Conservation

Tivoli Bays Wildlife Management Area and Research Reserve is a 1,722-acre (6.97 km^{2}) conservation area located in Dutchess County, New York. It was officially designated as a Natural Heritage Area in 2007 due to the fact that it is home to many species of endangered and/or rare plants and animals.

== Physical features ==
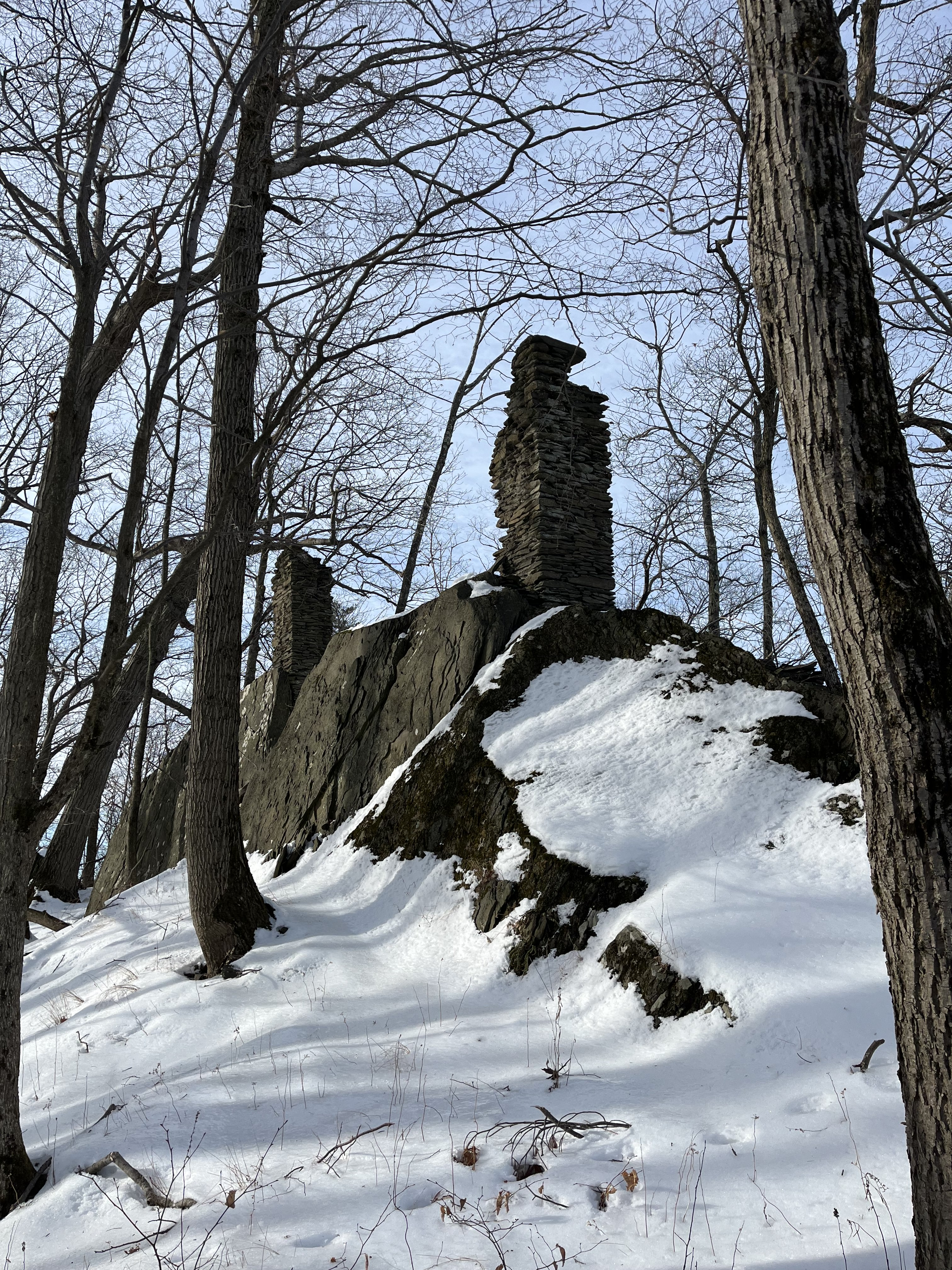
Ruined folly at Cruger Island

The Tivoli Bays Wildlife Management Area and Research Reserve consists of two coves on the east side of the Hudson River Between the Villages of Tivoli and Red Hook, as well as an extensive amount of uplands bordering the North Bay, sections of shoreline along the South Bay, two bedrock islands, Cruger and Magdalene Islands, and the mouths of two tributaries of the Hudson River, Stony Creek and the Saw Kill.

Since the Hudson River is a tidal river, Tivoli Bays are heavily affected by the rising and lowering tides of the Atlantic Ocean. Tivoli North Bay is primarily intertidal marsh, while Tivoli South Bay is a shallow cove consisting of mudflats that become exposed at low tide.

Tivoli Bays is said to contain the best quality examples of freshwater intertidal marsh and freshwater tidal swamp in the Hudson River Estuary.

== Natural Heritage Area designation ==
In order to be classified as a Natural Heritage Area in New York State, the agency responsible for the property needs to prove that the land or water in a certain area contains certain criteria, having mainly to do with the presence of rare or endangered species or ecological communities. Tivoli Bays was designated as a Natural Heritage Area in 2007.

== Recreation and facilities ==
Tivoli Bays is open to the public for recreation including hunting, trapping, freshwater fishing, hiking, biking, and paddling.

== Gallery ==
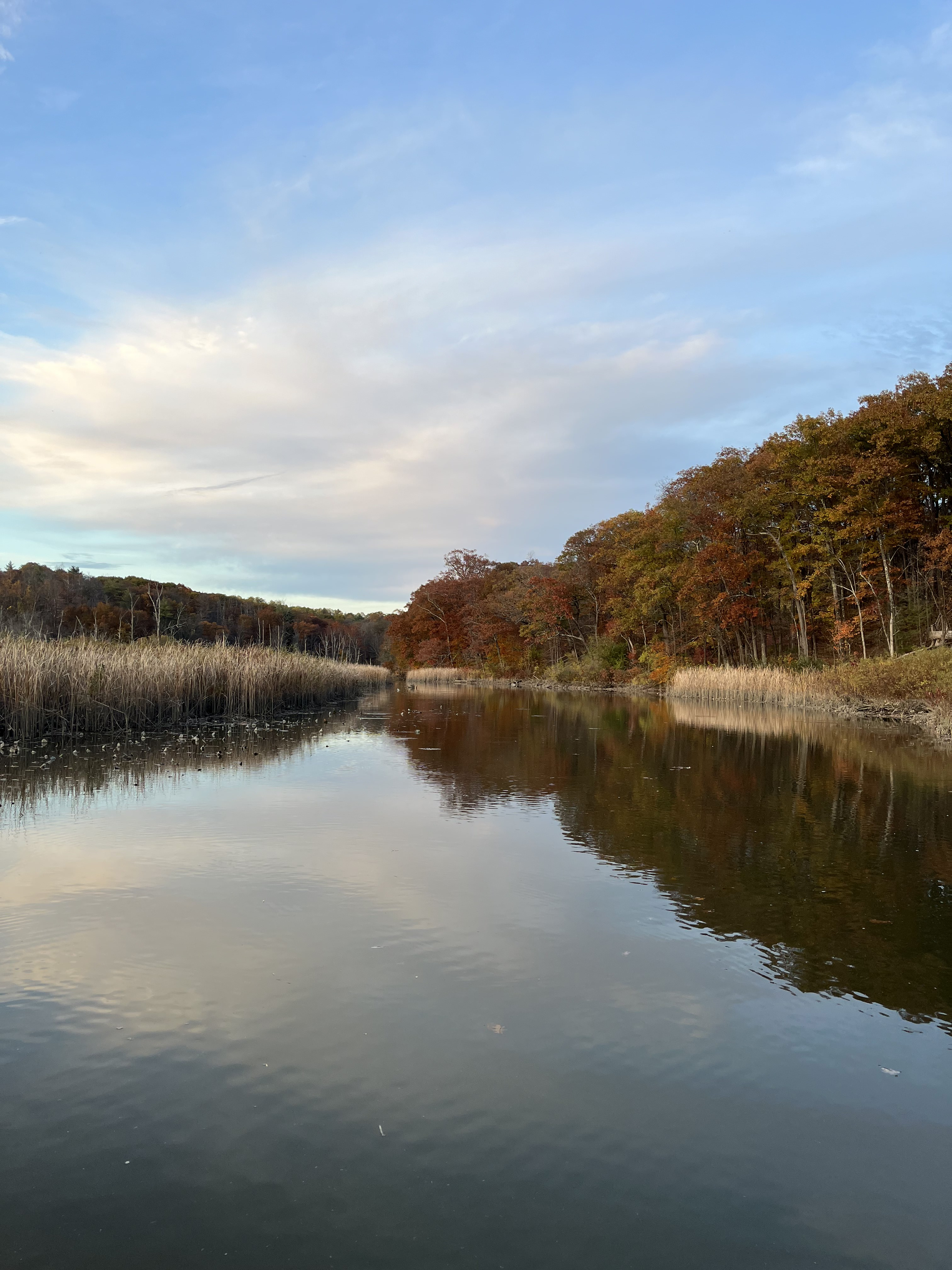
The shoreline of Tivoli North Bay

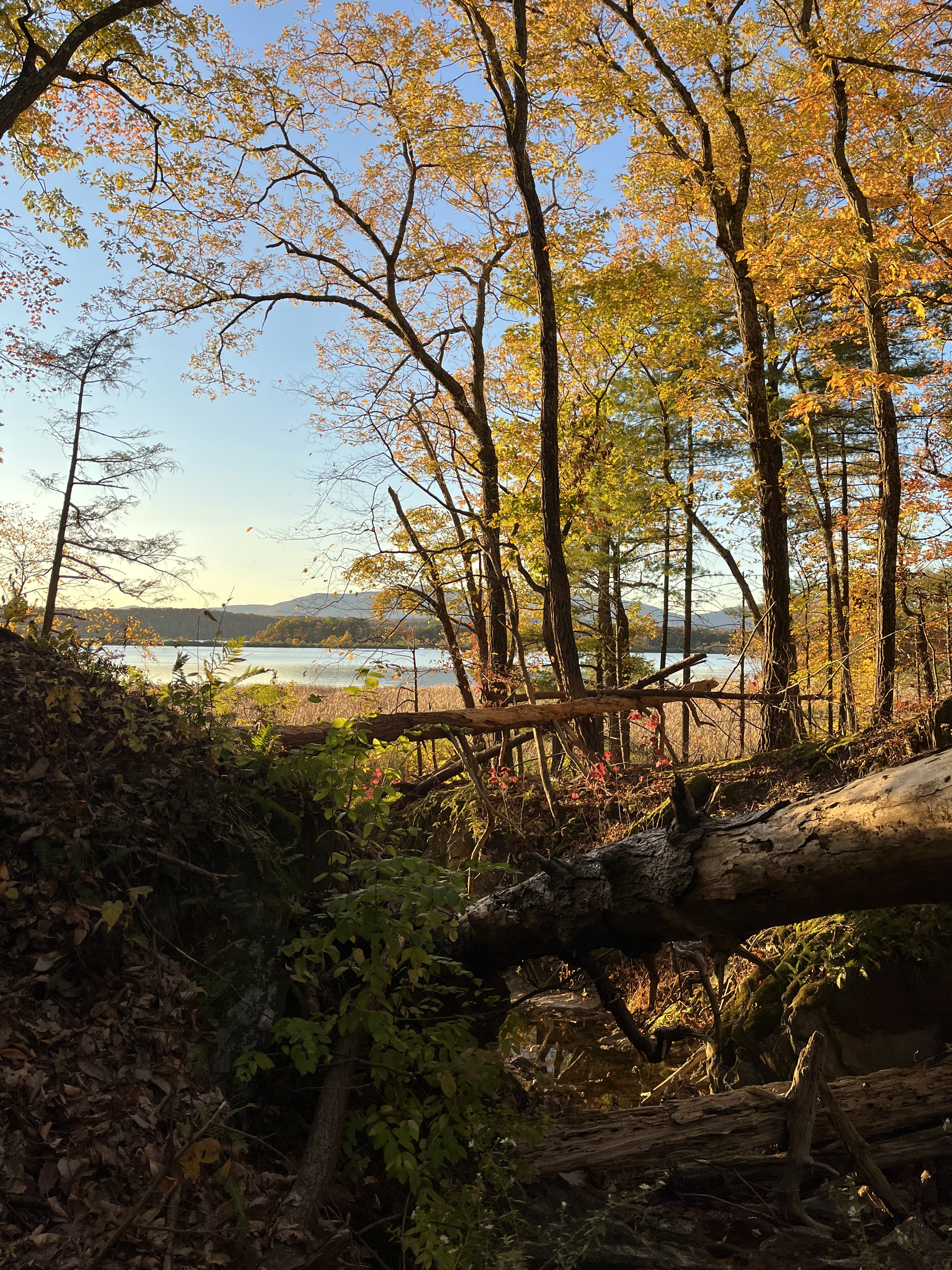
A trail within the Wildlife Management Area

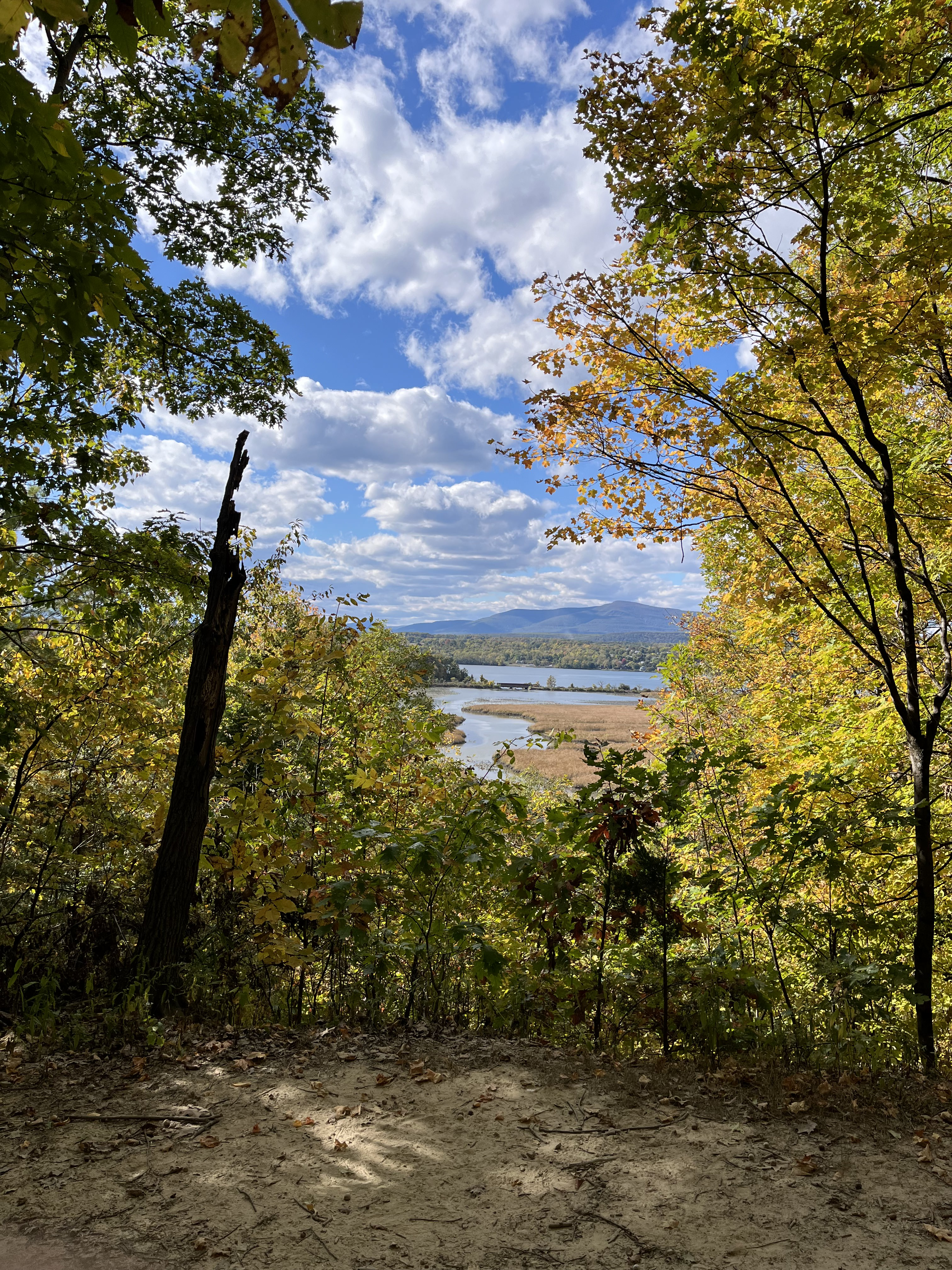
A view of North Bay, Saugerties, and the Catskills

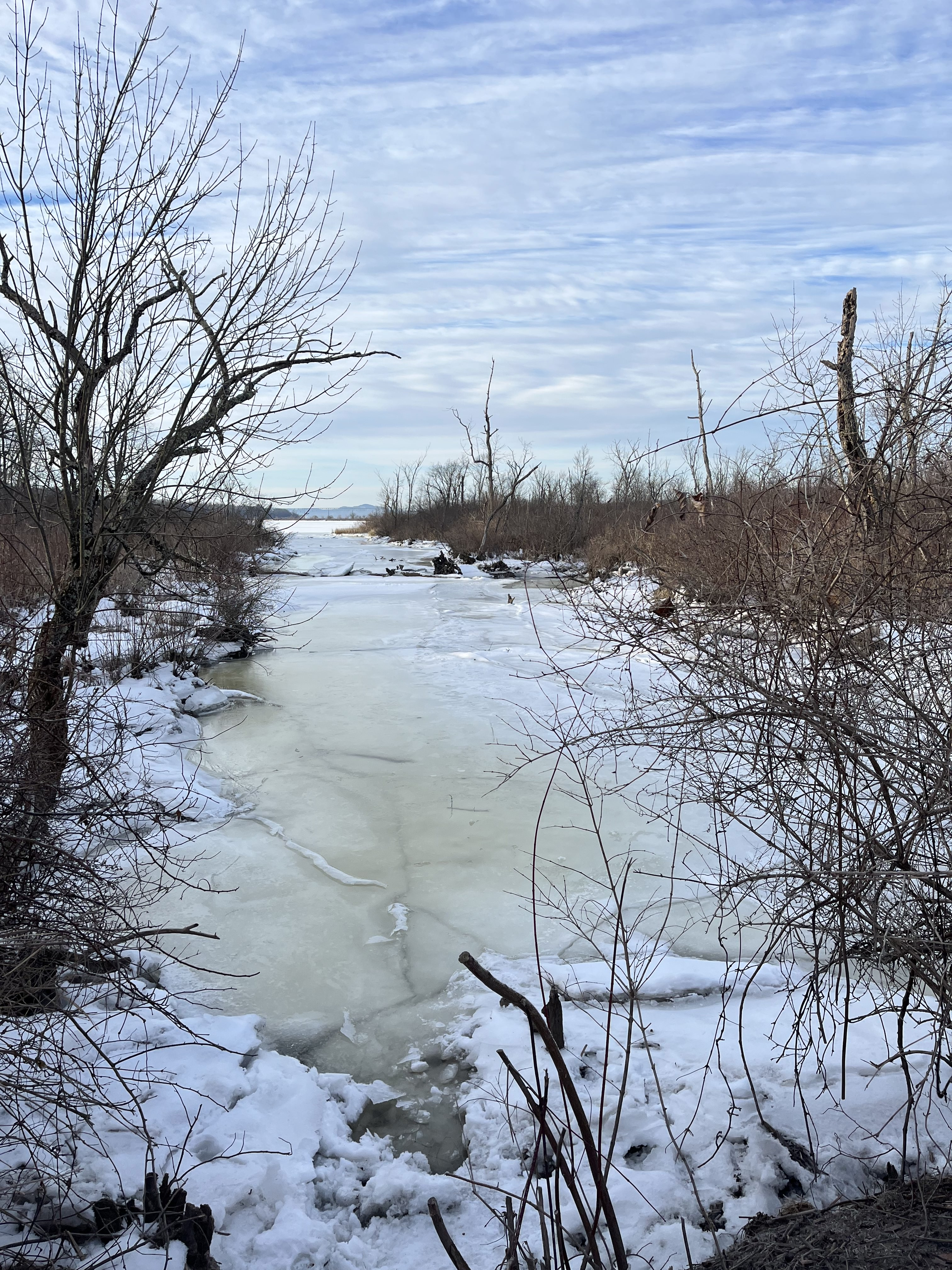
View of the Kingston–Rhinecliff Bridge from Cruger Island Road in winter

== See also ==
- New York State Wildlife Management Areas
