= Saw Kill (Hudson River tributary) =

Saw Kill Sawkill Creek
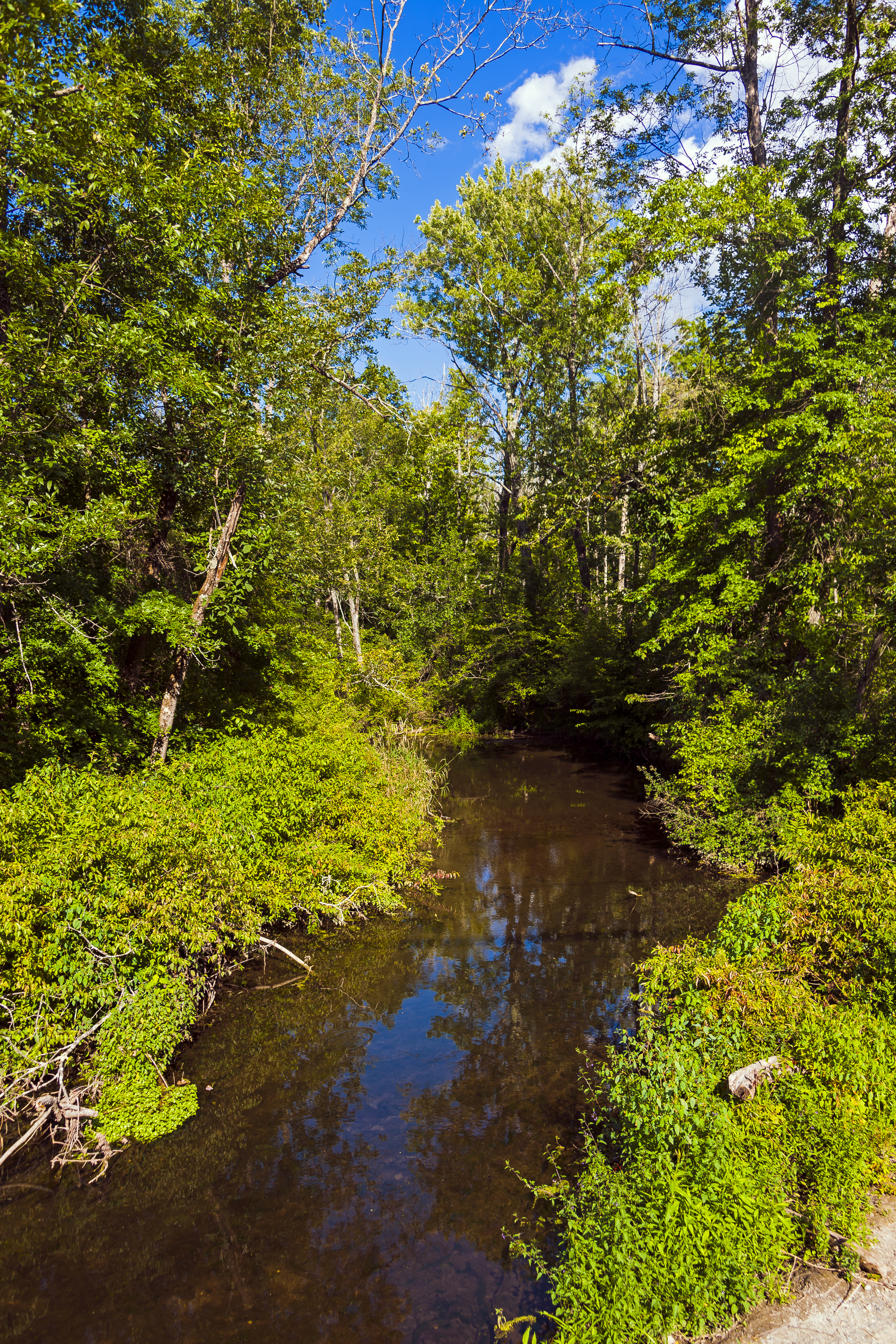
- Saw Kill from U.S. Route 9 in Red Hook

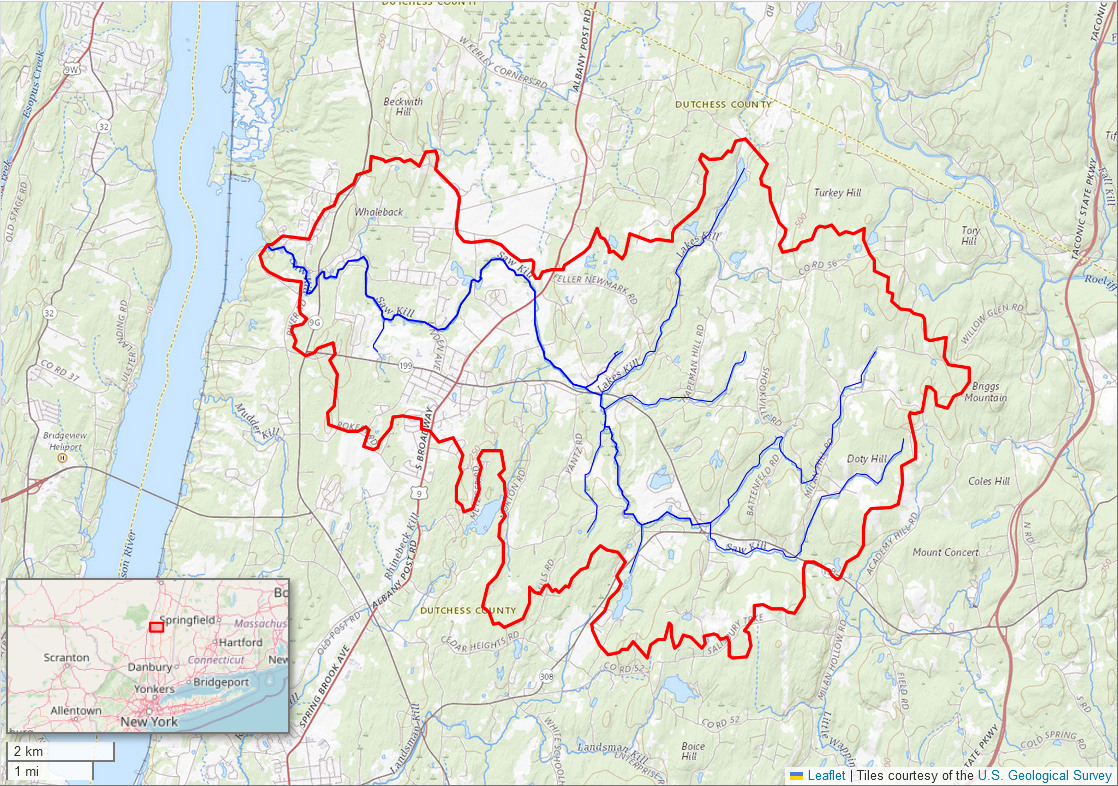
- Map of the Saw Kill watershed
- Etymology: Sawmills along banks of lower stream in 18th and 19th centuries
- Native name: Metambesem (Algonquin)

Location
- Country: United States
- State: New York
- Region: Hudson Valley
- County: Dutchess
- Towns: Milan, Red Hook

Physical characteristics
- Source: W slope of unnamed hill near Broadview Lane
  - location: Milan
  - coordinates: 41.98622°N 73.77592°W
  - elevation: 690 ft (210 m)
- Mouth: Hudson River at South Tivoli Bay
  - location: Red Hook
  - coordinates: 42.017261°N 73.917367°W
  - elevation: 0 ft (0 m)
- Length: 14.3 mi (23.0 km), E-W
- Basin size: 22 mi^{2} (57 km^{2})
- Discharge
  - location: Linden Avenue, Red Hook
  - average: 32.9 cu ft/s (0.93 m^{3}/s)

Basin features
- Tributaries
  - right: Lakes Kill

The Saw Kill is a 14.3-mile-long (23.0 km) tributary of the Hudson River, called the Metambesem by the Algonquin people of the area and sometimes called Sawkill Creek today. It rises in the town of Milan and drains a 22-square-mile (57 km^{2}) area of northwestern Dutchess County, New York, that includes most of the town of Red Hook to the west and part of Rhinebeck to Red Hook's south.

It flows predominantly through forests and farmland. Just above its mouth, it descends more steeply through a wooded area with several waterfalls into South Tivoli Bay, between the Montgomery Place estate and Bard College, which uses the stream as both its primary water source and for disposal of its treated wastewater. In the 1840s, the owners of those properties made an agreement to prevent development along the stream, one of the earliest such conservation measures in American history.

== Course ==
The Saw Kill at first descends rapidly through the hills in Milan and eastern Red Hook where it rises. As those hills level out, it then meanders slowly across the flatter, more developed areas closer to the village of Red Hook, then at Annandale-on-Hudson once again descends rapidly to its mouth.

=== Upper stream ===
The Saw Kill rises on the slopes of an unnamed hill, just east of Broadview Lane in the town of Milan, at an elevation of approximately 690 feet (210 m) above sea level. It flows southwesterly through forested land for its first half-mile (1 km), descending 140 feet (43 m) as it does, until it reaches a small farm pond at the edge of some cleared land and turns to the northwest as it flows out. Over its next mile (1.6 km), crossing more fields, it gradually bends southwest again until it flows under a farm road and, its uppermost crossing, and reaches another, larger farm pond roughly a thousand feet (300 m) east of Milan Hill Road (Dutchess County Route 54), having lost another 50 feet (15 m) in elevation.

From the pond's outlet the Saw Kill flows first westerly, then turning strongly to the south southwest as it enters a wooded ravine closely paralleling Milan Hill Road for the next 1,800 feet (600 m). By the time it reaches the swampy areas where it flows under New York State Route 199 (NY 199), the uppermost public crossing of the stream, it has dropped to 400 feet (120 m) above sea level. Just past the highway, it bends to the west and runs roughly parallel to it.

For its next mile the Saw Kill widens its distance from the highway, flowing into another small farm pond, behind an auto-body shop, Milan's fire garage and another farm, crossing under two more farm roads in the process. After the last one, a covered bridge, it flows into another farm pond approximately 300 feet (100 m) long, turning north then west. At its outlet it turns north again where it soon flows under both Old Mill Road and NY 199 again through a long culvert at the hamlet of Rock City. North of this it flows into a small unnamed lake, 330 feet (100 m) above sea level, where it receives an unnamed tributary from the northeast. It exits that lake flowing to the west southwest again, crossing under Sawmill Road adjacent to its junction with Rock City Road and then, 150 feet (50 m) downstream, under NY 199 again, as both enter the town of Red Hook.

After this crossing, the Saw Kill flows roughly west through some swampy areas along the Rhinebeck town line for the next half-mile, in a wooded corridor south of a golf course. After receiving the Sepasco Lake outlet stream from the south, it bends northwest again, into a small lake. At the end of the lake a small private footbridge crosses, then the stream bends and descends 90 feet (27 m) to 240 feet (73 m) in elevation through a series of cascades alongside Oriole Mills Road to Camp Rising Sun.

=== Lower stream ===
The Saw Kill then flows generally north through level ground for its next mile, beginning to meander as it passes Sky Park Airport. Just short of NY 199, it receives its only named tributary, the Lakes Kill, from the north, and turns west again, following the highway to the south for 600 feet (200 m), before crossing under it for the fourth and final time. From there it distances itself from the road as it takes a more northwesterly heading.

The surrounding terrain remains generally flat but more fields begin to abut the stream corridor as it turns more to the north and crosses under Echo Valley Road. It remains on an almost northerly course for the next half-mile, flowing through a narrow wooded corridor between fields, to where U.S. Route 9 crosses. The Saw Kill bends to the northwest past this bridge, and toughly 2,000 feet (600 m) from US 9, it turns to the west and then southwest, still in a forested corridor through worked agricultural land.

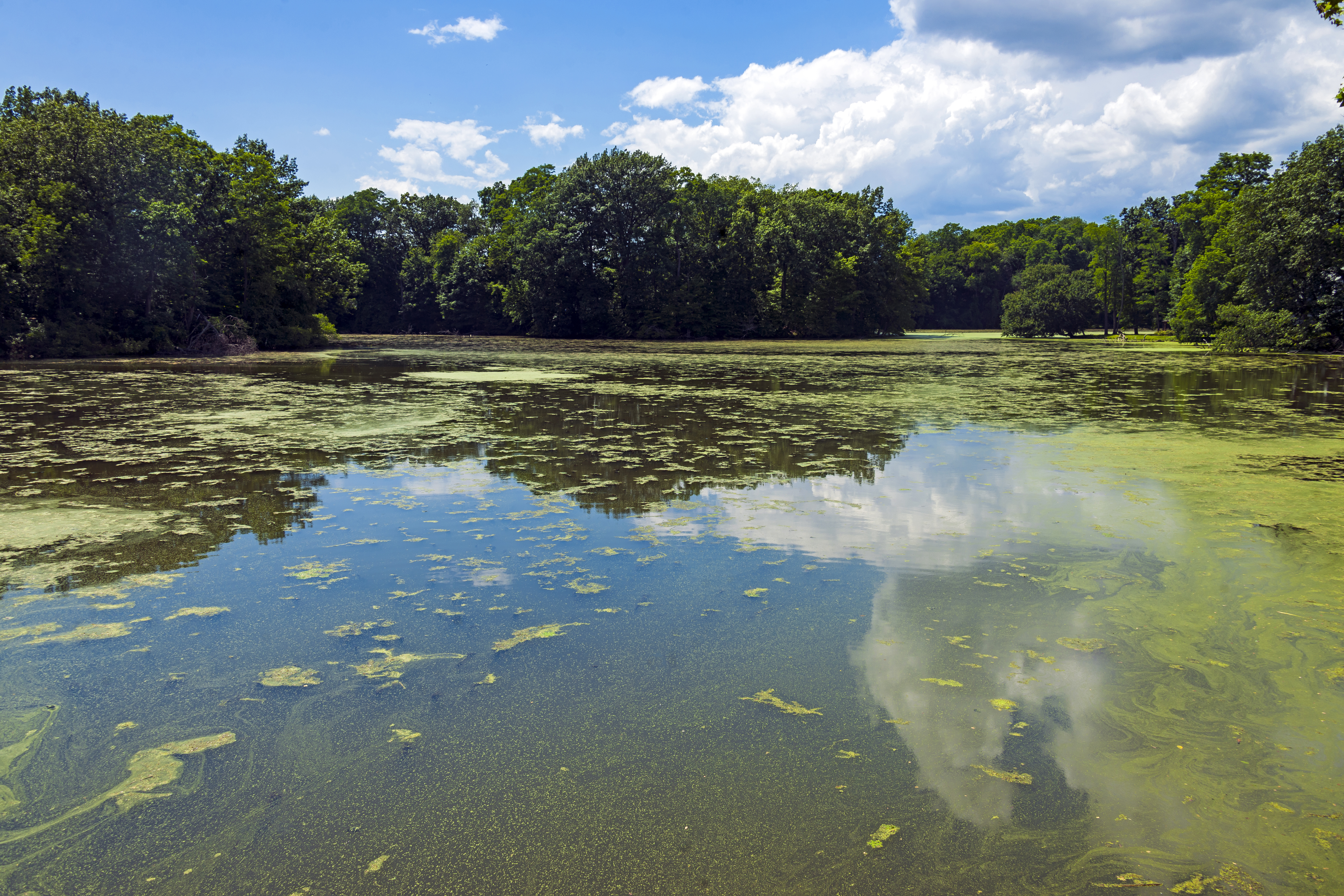
The lake at Mill Road

As it reaches the Mill Road bridge, the Saw Kill widens into a lake, at 200 feet (61 m) elevation, created by a dam southwest of the crossing, that extends 1,500 feet (500 m) to the northwest as well. Past the dam, now wider, it continues to flow southwest in a wooded corridor past a Red Hook town park on the west, just outside the Red Hook village line before it flows under Linden Avenue (Dutchess County Route 79). West of Linden it meanders again as it flows to the west for the next mile, just inside the edge of a large wooded area that abuts worked fields, then turns northwestward to cross under Aspinwall Road.

Over its next thousand feet (300 m), the Saw Kill turns west, receives another unnamed tributary from the north, then turns southwest to cross under Aspinwall Road again. The surrounding area remains level and heavily wooded but now on either side of the stream are large residential lots. The Saw Kill follows the rear lines of lots along West Bard Avenue west and then briefly north to Kelly Road, where it bends southeast again to cross under New York State Route 9G having descended 50 feet (15 m) from the lake at Mill Road to 150 feet (46 m) above sea level.

The Saw Kill first flows parallel to 9G, then bends quickly to back to the northeast, where it is again dammed in the hamlet of Annandale-on-Hudson, part of the Hudson River Historic District, a National Historic Landmark (NHL), before flowing under its last crossing at River Road (Dutchess County Route 103). It flows north, parallel to the road, until turning northwest at Cedar Hill Road, part of the Bard College campus. At this point, it begins to descend again rapidly over a series of waterfalls and cascades, reaching 100 feet (30 m) in elevation in just 150 feet (50 m).

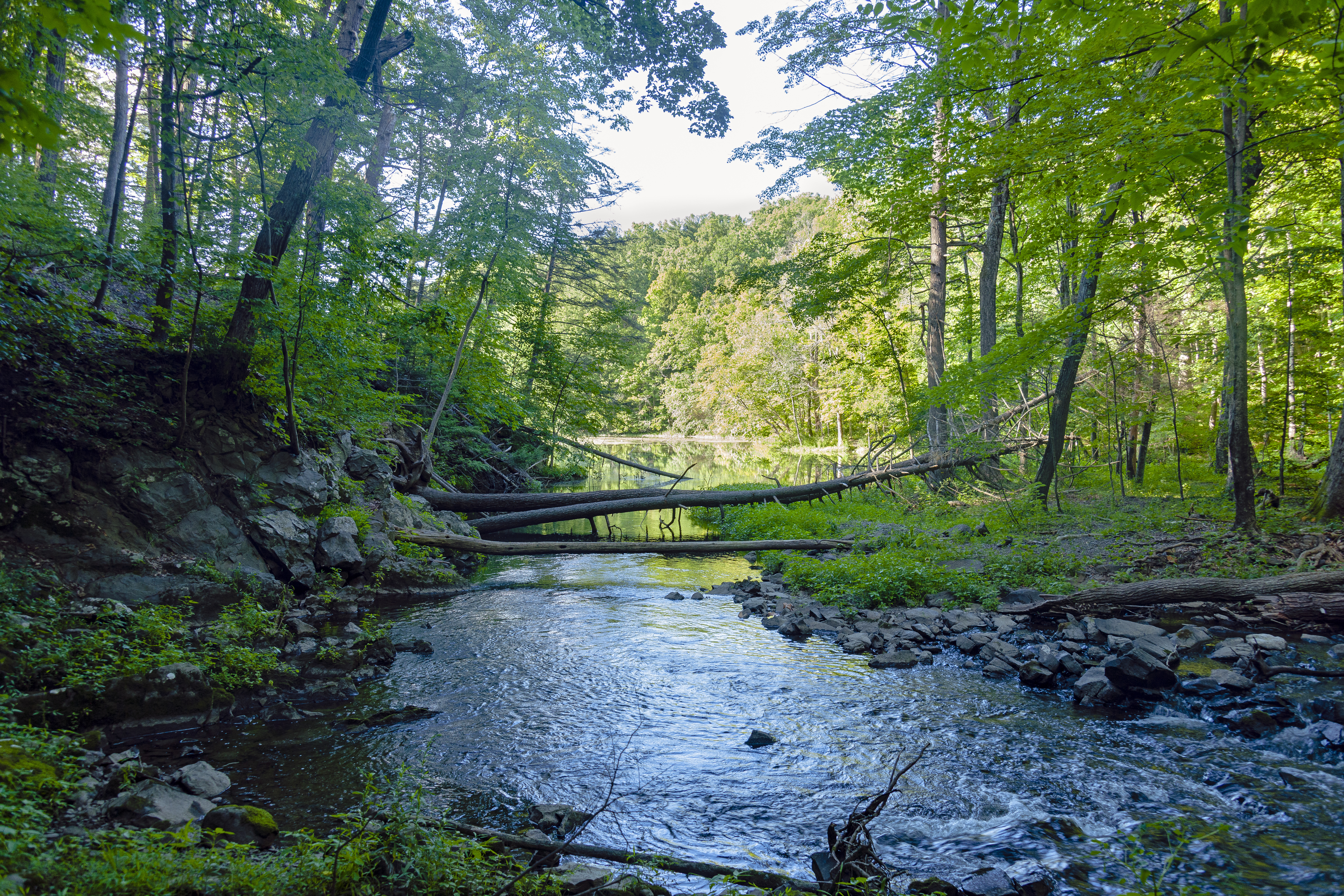
Mouth of the Saw Kill

Amidst woods again, with the historic Montgomery Place estate, another NHL, on its south side, the stream turns north for 500 feet (150 m), then west northwest where it again descends over Zabriskie's Falls to bring it down to 50 feet (15 m) in elevation. Foot trails parallel it on both sides as it descends through more cascades to empty into the Hudson River.

== Watershed ==
The Saw Kill watershed covers 22 square miles (57 km^{2}), with the stream and its tributaries totalling 54.8 miles (88.2 km). It includes more of the town of Red Hook than any of its other watersheds, stretching from its mouth west to expand enough to include almost all of the village and most of the town west of it. In Milan, the watershed covers a roughly semicircular area of the eastern half of town. The Rhinebeck portion, the smallest of any of the three towns in the watershed, includes the areas around Sepasco Lake and a large swampy area near the Old Rhinebeck Aerodrome from which an unnamed tributary arises.

Terrain in the watershed is hilly and wooded at its eastern end, with the highest point, an unnamed 880-foot (270 m) hill, north of Willow Glen Road in Milan. Just east of the Red Hook–Milan town line, the hills level off into gently rolling land, much of which is under cultivation. As the stream approaches the Hudson, the land becomes wooded again and slightly hillier, as it reaches the sloping land adjacent to the river bank.

According to a 1991 study, land in the watershed is 51.1% forested, with 31% second-growth deciduous, 14% coniferous and 4% mixed cover. Another 25.8% is agricultural, mostly hayfields or row crops. Low-density residential use accounts for 7.5%, with medium- and higher density areas taking up another 5.4%; most of this use is in the village of Red Hook or subdivisions in the outwash plain north of it. Farmsteads bring total residential use to 13.6%. Commercial use accounts for only 2.8% of the watershed; again most of this is concentrated in the village of Red Hook. Lakes and wetlands cover 2%.

There are no significant protected areas in the watershed. However, several conservation organizations hold easements preventing development on large tracts. Scenic Hudson has the largest, to the northeast of the village of Red Hook covering much of the Lakes Kill subwatershed, as well as another, smaller tract west of the village and north of NY 199, just west of Red Hook High School. It also holds the easements on the Montgomery Place and Bard College properties abutting the stream's lowest section. The Dutchess Land Conservancy holds easements to a large tract abutting the Scenic Hudson easement on its northwest, some of which overlaps into the Stony Creek watershed to the north. A portion of the tributary from the Old Rhinebeck Aerodrome is covered by a Winakee Land Trust easement.

== History ==
=== Formation ===
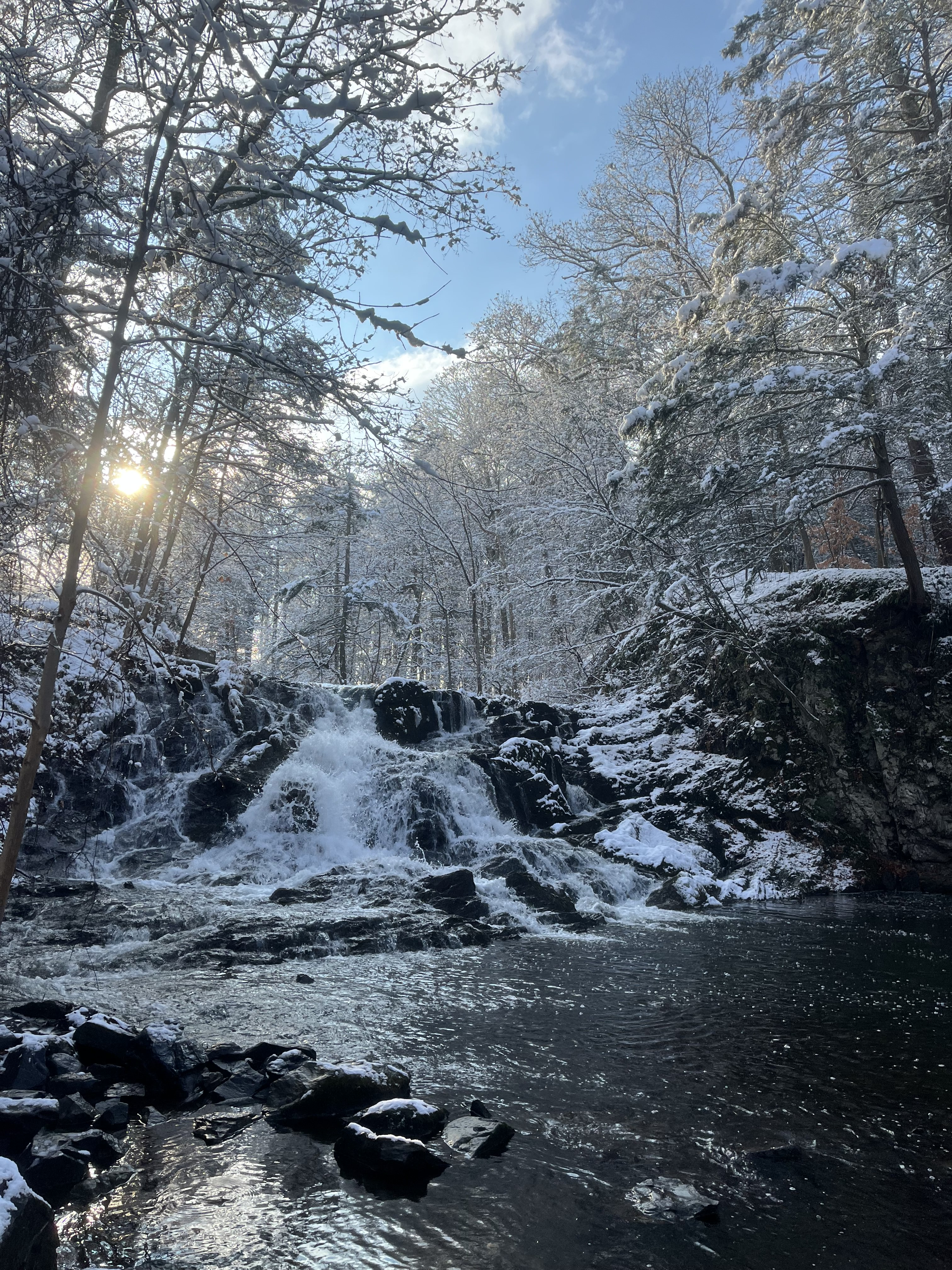
Saw Kill's lower falls in winter

The Saw Kill grew from one of the many tributaries of Lake Albany, a proglacial lake that filled most of the Hudson Valley north of the Hudson Highlands centered on the present-day location of Albany during the Wisconsinan glaciation, the last ice age, 12–15,000 years ago. At the time of its existence the lake filled the valley up to what is now the 250-foot (76 m) contour line, roughly where the Saw Kill today drops through a series of cascades to Camp Rising Sun in Red Hook. The retreat of the lake as it flowed southward to become today's river left the glacial outwash plain the stream flows through from there to the river's current escarpment at Annandale and eventually into the Hudson.

=== Early human use ===
As the glaciers melted and the Hudson formed, animals and plants that came back to the region found tributaries like the Saw Kill good places to re-establish themselves and gradually followed them into the interior. The Native American tribes that settled in the region afterwards found them similarly useful, as paths between settlements. They also hunted and fished the stream for sustenance. Archeological investigations at Montgomery Place, south of the stream's mouth, have found evidence of the land's use as a hunting ground 5,000 years ago.

=== 1620s–1803: Development ===
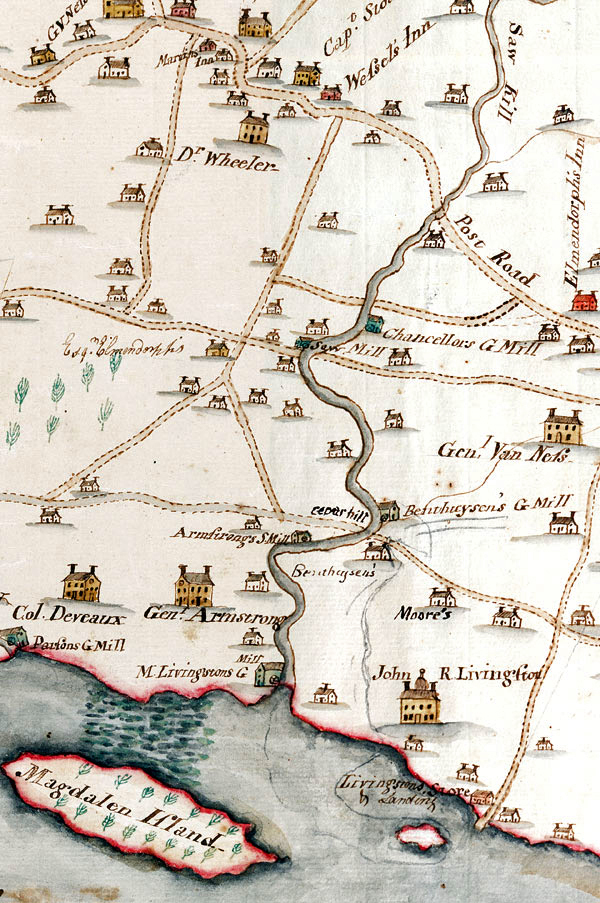
A 1798 map showing the lower Saw Kill and the estates around it

The Dutch began settling the region in the 1620s. The first settlers followed the lead of the Indians in using the tributaries as transportation routes and food sources. However, as more Dutch settlers arrived, they began to see the stream as an ideal place to build mills, particularly the sawmills that gave it its name. Land speculators bought water rights to the Saw Kill before anything had been built.

The Saw Kill and the majority of the land north of the Saw Kill watershed was sold to Colonel Pieter Schuyler in 1688. His patents for Rhinebeck lasted until 1840. The deed paperwork refers to the Saw Kill as the Metambesem, the Algonquin name for it, which has not otherwise survived.

Schuyler's patents slowed agricultural development rates along the Saw Kill, despite rapid agricultural expansion in Dutchess County starting in 1750. Sawmills and gristmills were nevertheless built. By 1777 they were present not only near the stream's mouth but upstream at the present-day locations of Red Hook Mills, where Mill Road crosses and the stream is still impounded into a small lake, and Rock City. Mills were commonplace along the stream by the end of the 18th century. Milling died down by the end of the 19th due to decreased profitability.

Pressure for industrial expansion on the Saw Kill increased in the mid-1800s. Some residents, like Louise Livingston of Montgomery Place, built in 1803 on a bluff south of its mouth, saw this as a threat to the peacefulness and natural beauty of the stream. Her sister-in-law, Janet Livingston Montgomery, widow of Revolutionary War general Richard Montgomery, had bought the 242 acres (98 ha) on which the estate was built shortly after her husband's death in the Battle of Quebec, building the house and establishing an ornamental farm on the property.

=== 19th century: Conservation ===
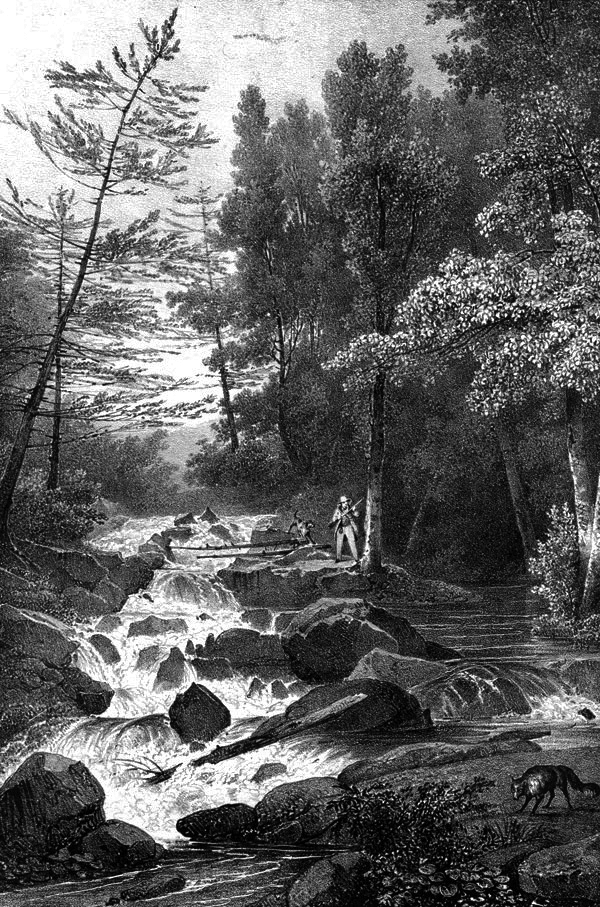
Lower Falls, Montgomery Place, by Milbert

In the 1820s, the Saw Kill's lower gorge was the subject of some works by notable artists. Jacques-Gérard Milbert produced a lithograph, and Alexander Jackson Davis painted Janet Livingston enjoying the scene while he was in the process of designing the Montgomery Place house. The Marquis de Lafayette made a point of visiting it when he stopped to see Janet Montgomery on his return to America in 1825.

Louise Livingston, along with Robert Donaldson, whose neighboring Blithewood estate later became the campus of Bard College, purchased land on the Saw Kill in 1841 to prevent extraction and factory development (an existing mill at the creek's mouth was demolished; some of it remains extant).

They feared losing the pristine quality of the river to noise, loss of natural landscape, and factory worker intrusion. Hunting was also considered a disruption of peace and safety to the quality of living by wealthy landowners. Nevertheless, the practice remained commonplace into the 20th century.

Livingston and Donaldson connected their properties with trails and footbridges over the stream. Small wooden pavilions were also built to allow visitors to take in the beauty of the stream. The legal agreement between them is one of the earliest such land-conservation covenants in American history.

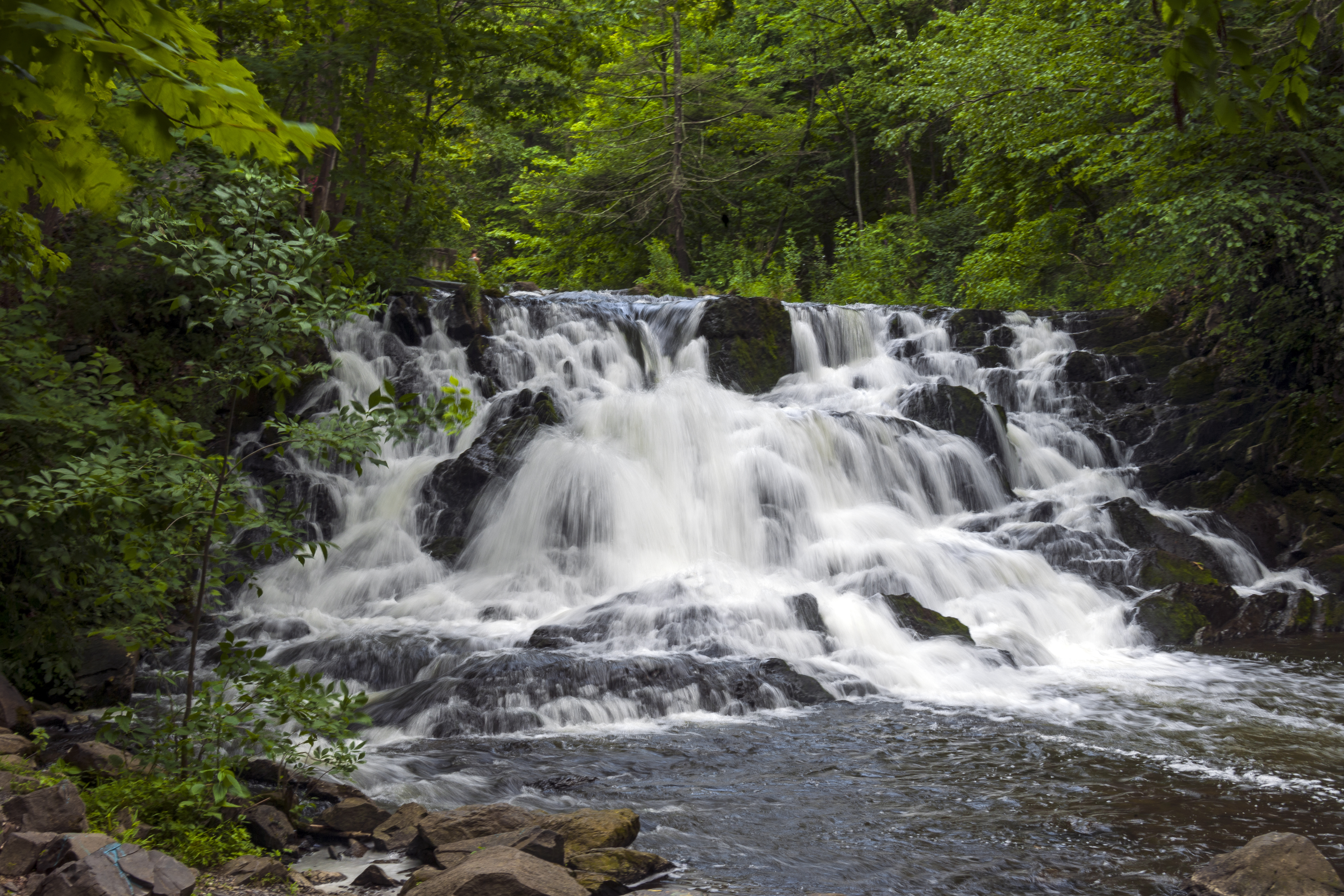
Donaldson and Livingston preserved the stream's picturesque lower portion between their estates

In the 1860s Theodore Roosevelt's family rented a small estate near Montgomery Place for several years, spending summers there. He often explored the lower Saw Kill, at one point canoeing around its mouth and adjacent bay, finding it fascinating both aesthetically and scientifically, according to letters he wrote to his nanny back in New York. Some of his biographers credit the experience with his lifelong interest in conservation and land preservation.

=== 20th century ===
In 1921 Livingston descendants the Delafields moved in to Montgomery Place. They put the Saw Kill to industrial use again, building a power station on one of the lakes created by the earlier mills. Completed two years later, it provided electricity not just for the estate but for all Annandale.

The Delafields frequently hiked in the woods, and boated and swam in the lakes. Violetta Delafield, a botanist, continued the earlier conservation traditions by documenting the mushroom species she found in the woods. In addition to her text notes, she painted watercolors of them.

In 1951 the Blithewood estate north of the Saw Kill's lower stretch across from Montgomery Place was donated to Bard College, which continued to keep it predominantly natural. Annandale and Montgomery Place were connected to local power in 1965, although the Delafields' generating station remained online as backup through 1983. In 1985 the Delafields sold the estate to the Westchester County-based preservation organization Historic Hudson Valley, which opened it to the public for tours, and continued to maintain the trails along the Saw Kill.

Between 1975 and 1982 two local conservation groups, in conjunction with Bard, regularly tested the stream's water quality at 14 locations from the mouth to Rock City, including the Lakes Kill and some other unnamed tributaries, as well as effluent from wastewater treatment plants at Bard and Camp Rising Sun and the Orchard Hill chicken pie factory in the village of Red Hook (since closed). According to a 1977 article in a local newspaper, the Saw Kill was in good shape. "There is little in the way of man-made pollution", said a member. He particularly praised Orchard Hill for installing a new treatment system and eliminating most of the harmful waste it was discharging into a nearby tributary.

=== 21st century ===
Bard, which both taps the Saw Kill for drinking water and, further downstream, discharges its treated wastewater into it, began monitoring the stream's health in the early 2000s. In 2006 it built an eel ladder below one of the surviving dams in cooperation with the state Department of Environmental Conservation's Hudson Estuary Program to allow American eels to reach their mating grounds upstream. Later in the decade, after winning a state grant, the college began exploring the possibility of generating power at the dams, if not elsewhere in the state, to offset greenhouse gas production.

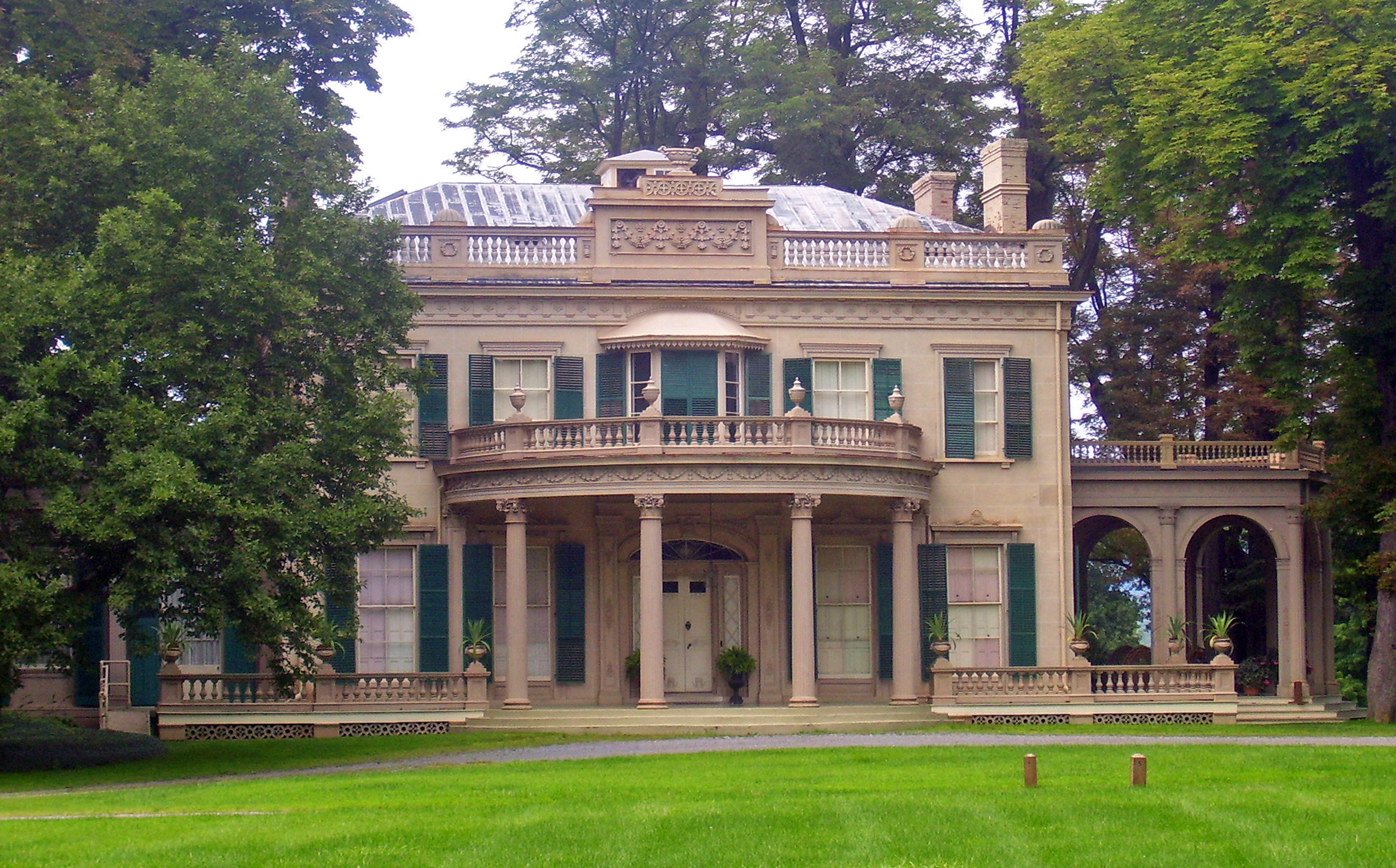
Bard bought Montgomery Place in 2016.

In 2009 Historic Hudson Valley considered selling Montgomery Place, which it said it had bought without realizing how much it would cost to maintain, much less renovate. After criticism from the Delafields, who had similarly found the property too expensive to keep, the organization abandoned the idea. In 2016 it sold the property to Bard for $17 million, putting both sides of the lower Saw Kill under the same ownership for the first time.

== Geology ==
The Saw Kill, like its watershed, exhibits two different geologies, reflecting its formation. In the west, below 250 feet (76 m) in elevation, the stream is underlain by silt, sand and gravel, remnants of the lake bed and glacial outwash plain it once was. In the east, as the land rises to areas that were not submerged in Lake Albany, glacial till covers shale bedrock of the Normanskill Formation. Soil complexes consisting of silt loams covering bedrock to depths of 2.6–7.5 feet (0.8–2.3 m) cover 45% of the watershed.

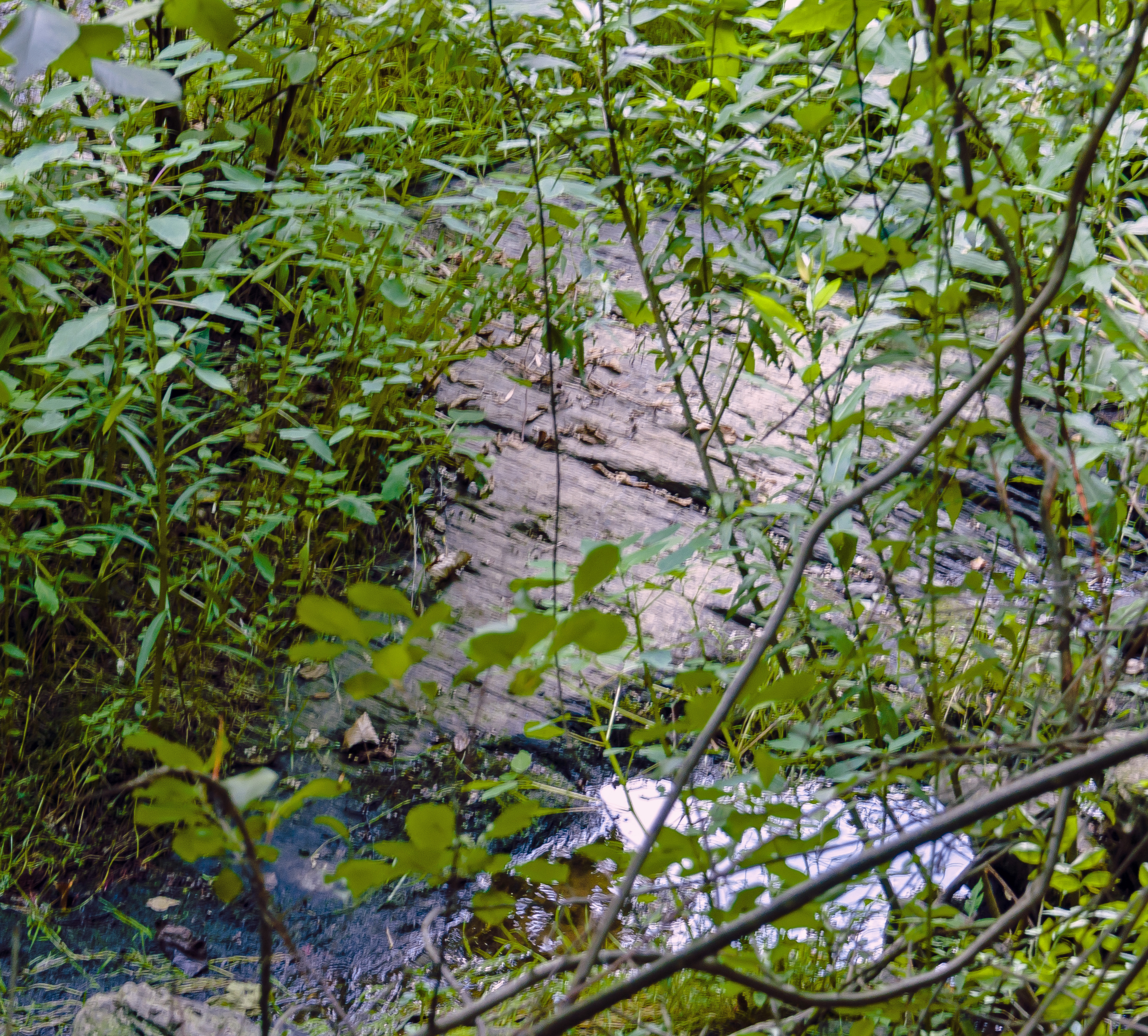
Shale bedrock in the Saw Kill at Rock City

A 1998 study by two foresters compared soil erosion in the Saw Kill watershed with that of Stony Creek, the Hudson subwatershed directly to the north, since both streams empty into the very similar Tivoli Bays, where sediment from the streams themselves can easily be distinguished, and the two streams' watersheds are almost the same size. The two bays differ in terrain, with the North Bay into which the Stony Creek empties having become over the years since European settlement a raised marsh overgrown with cattails, while the South Bay, fed by the Saw Kill, has remained open water. The researchers asked what factors might have caused this "unplanned natural experiment in wetland creation."

They chose to focus on historical patterns of settlement and development, comparing the two watersheds over time from the late 17th century to the present. In particular they focused on agricultural use, since it involves the clearing of land, thus increasing the potential for erosion. However, they found that the Saw Kill, despite heavier development, and greater present use, for farming, had twice as much soil erosion annually as the Stony Creek watershed. They posited that where the clearing took place within the watershed might have more bearing on how much soil erodes, and what that sediment does once it is deposited in the river; more research, they said, was necessary.

== Hydrology ==
The Saw Kill's discharge is not regularly measured, but 1968 data from the United States Geological Survey, based on measurements close to Red Hook, gives it a 10th–90th percentile range of 4.6–68 cubic feet (0.13–1.93 m^{3}) per second, for an average of 32.9 cubic feet (0.93 m^{3}) per second. Precipitation ranges from 35 to 43 inches (900 to 1,100 mm) annually; it is uniformly distributed throughout the year. Mean January and July temperatures are 25 °F (−4 °C) and 73 °F (23 °C) respectively.

The 1975–82 sampling project found the Saw Kill and its tributaries at that time to generally be healthy. There were occasionally surges of coliform bacteria near the Bard wastewater treatment plant and on the tributary flowing from behind the Orchard Hill plant, but those did not seem to be a regular trend. Dissolved oxygen levels, important to aquatic life in the stream, remained within normal limits.

In 2004 Dutchess County's planning department did sampling of its own as part of a countywide inventory of water resources. The Saw Kill was found to have the second highest nitrate concentration in the county after Fishkill Creek and the highest phosphate concentration. The report's writers speculated that that may have occurred because the sampling sites were below the wastewater treatment plants that discharge into the stream.

Three years later New York's Department of Environmental Conservation (DEC) classified the entire Saw Kill as a Class B stream in its water quality report on the state's waterbodies. That means it can be used for swimming, boating, angling and other recreational purposes, as well as for drinking if suitable precautions are taken. While a 1998 macroinvertebrate study near the stream's mouth had found the Saw Kill to be "slightly impacted", perhaps by non-point source insecticide and fertilizer use, it was not impaired and could fully support aquatic life.

Bard initiated a renewal of the earlier citizen sampling project in 2016. Volunteers sample the stream at 13 different locations, some of which have been used in other studies, and those samples are tested for Enterococcus. Those results are posted in real time on the Riverkeeper website along with data from the Hudson and its other tributaries.

== Biology ==
In 1998 a Bard graduate student, in conjunction with the Institute of Ecosystem Studies in nearby Millbrook, studied the biotic effect of land use in the Saw Kill watershed. She compared the populations of pollution-intolerant insect species such as mayflies, caddisflies and Tanytarsini midges with more pollution-tolerant fly species, and other species such as leeches and snails with greater tolerance. Her results led her to agree with earlier research on the stream's chemical profile suggesting that residential use had a greater negative impact on the water than farming.

Above Annandale and north of the village of Red Hook, DEC stocks the Saw Kill with brown trout, and some brook trout, every year, for anglers. Other than the stream south of the Red Hook Town recreation park next to the Linden Avenue bridge, public fishing rights are limited to the vicinity of the bridges along that section of the stream, per state law. The season for trout in the Saw Kill ends in mid-October, earlier than it does on most other waterways in the state.

== Conservation ==
In 2015, Bard and other stakeholders formed the Saw Kill Watershed Community (SKWC) to advocate for and preserve the stream's quality. Among its early initiatives was reviving the earlier citizen-monitoring program, which has so far shown the stream to be as clean as it was in the 1970s and '80s. The SKWC also engages in stewardship activities such as streamside cleanup, outreach to residents and local government, and educational initiatives.

The SKWC's work is more than local. In early 2017 a delegation traveled to Astrakhan State University in Russia where they worked with student groups there. The collaboration produced a guide to activities that can engage young people in watershed protection and conservation; the SKWC made it available in English and Russian on its website.

== See also ==
- Geography of New York
- List of rivers in New York
