= Maunsell Crosby =

American ornithologist (1887–1931)

- Born: Maunsell Schieffelin Crosby; February 14, 1887
- Died: 1931 (aged 43–44)
- Occupations: Ornithologist writer farmer
- Spouse: Elizabeth Coolidge (m. 1908; div. 1916)
- Children: 2

Maunsell Schieffelin Crosby (February 14, 1887 - 1931) was an American ornithologist, writer, and farmer. Crosby was the son of Ernest Howard Crosby, a noted author and reformer who served in the seat in the New York State Legislature formerly held by Theodore Roosevelt. Crosby was also a nephew of Eugene Schieffelin, the bird enthusiast who introduced the starling to the U.S. The 1933 book The Birds of Dutchess County by Ludlow Griscom based much of its information on records compiled by Crosby.

== Early life and education ==
Crosby was born to Ernest Howard Crosby and Fanny Kendall Schieffelin Crosby in New York City on February 14, 1887. He graduated from Morristown School (now Morristown-Beard School) in Morristown, New Jersey in 1904. During his three years of study at Morristown School (1901-1904), Crosby grew his interest in ornithology. In 1915, he published an article titled "Some Notes from Morristown, N. J." in The Oriole, a magazine published by the Somerset Hills Bird Club in Somerset Hills, New Jersey. The article describes his experiences observing birds as a youth.

In 1908, Crosby completed his bachelor's degree at Harvard University in Cambridge, Massachusetts in 1908. While studying at the school, he ran for the Harvard Crimson's cross country team. Following his graduation from the school, Crosby went on a three-month overseas trip to Western Europe. He traveled through the countries of England, France, the Netherlands, Germany, and Austria-Hungary (now the countries of Austria and Hungary).

Crosby and noted poet John Hall Wheelock were classmates at both Morristown School and Harvard; Wheelock and Crosby roomed together during their sophomore year at Harvard. Wheelock later served as the best man at Crosby's wedding.

== Birding expeditions ==
Crosby made several expeditions to Central America and South America for the Museum of Natural History in New York City. In 1921, he traveled on an expedition to Panama with Ludlow Griscom that brought back about 500 species of birds. Many of these species had been previously unknown to scientists in the United States.

== Dutchess County farm ==
Returning from his overseas trip to Europe, Crosby took over management of Grasmere, the family farm. His mother Fanny had operated Grasmere for 15 years after purchasing it from Margaret Livingston Lee. On the purchase of the Grasmere estate Fanny was supported by her mother Sarah Minerva Kendall Schieffelin, widow of Henry Maunsell Schieffelin, in 1894.

Crosby raised livestock, including Jersey cattle, Brown Swiss cattle, Holstein Friesian cattle, hogs, chickens, turkeys, and ducks. He also grew apples, pears, potatoes, beans, and other crops.

In 1987, Grasmere received a placement on the National Register of Historic Places. The property, which dates from the 18th Century, once served as the birthplace of William Alexander Duer, president of Columbia College (now Columbia University).

== Military and government service ==
Crosby worked at the Division of Forests at the New York State Conservation Commission (now the Department of Environmental Conservation) from 1912 to 1913. In 1912, he joined the 10th New York Infantry Division as a second lieutenant. Crosby received promotions to first lieutenant in 1914 and captain in the Quartermaster Corps on 1917. Later that year, he entered federal military service with an assignment to the New York State Arsenal. Crosby transferred to Camp Mills in August 1917.

While serving in the military, Crosby was appointed to serve as an aide to Governor Charles S. Whitman. He served in that role from 1915 to 1917.

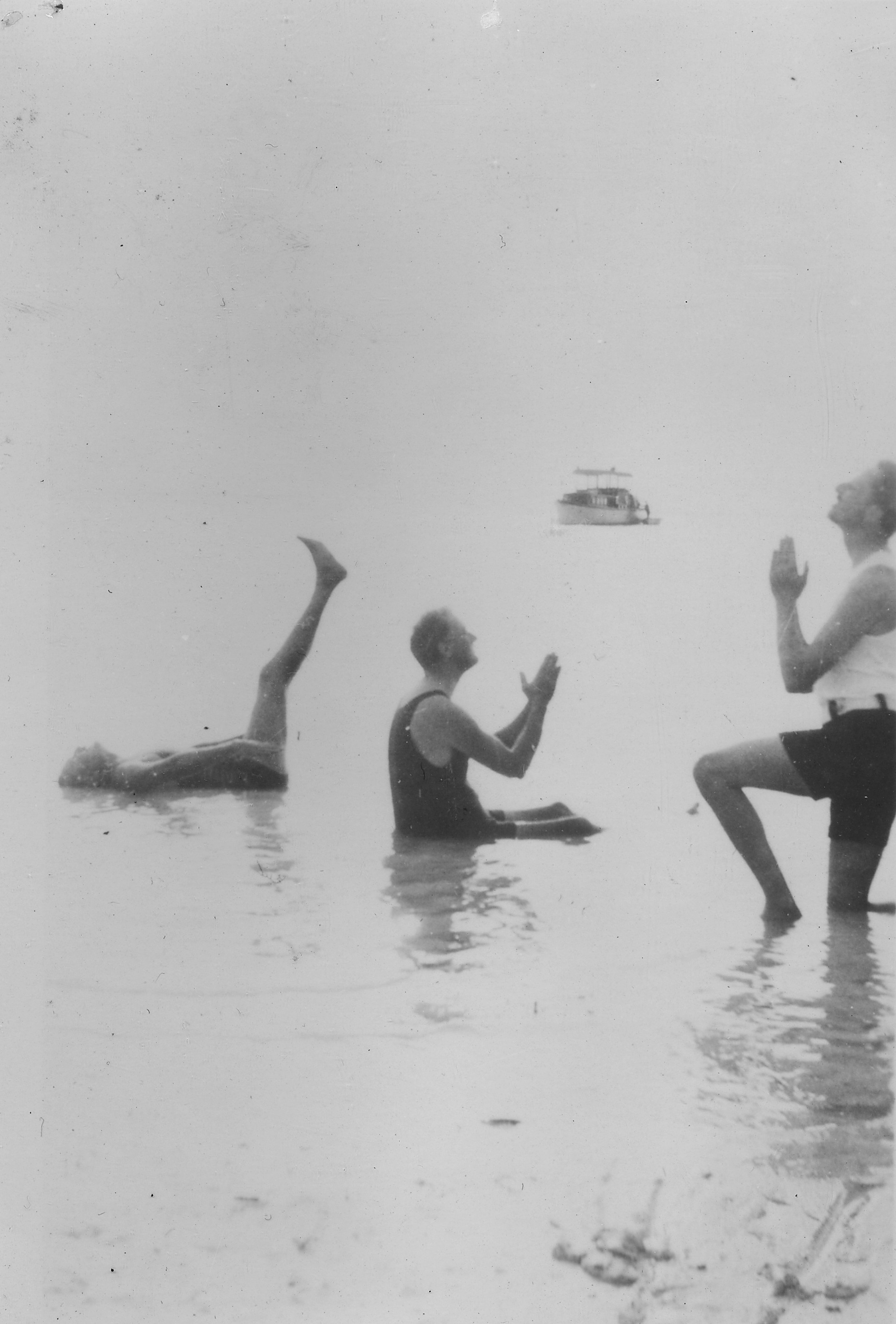
Franklin D. Roosevelt, Maunsell Crosby and Oswald Mosley in Florida, February 1926

== Historical legacy ==
Crosby developed a close friendship with Franklin Roosevelt during their days in Hyde Park, New York; They were neighbors who shared a common interest in ornithology. The Hudson River Valley and Dutchess County Manuscript Collection at the Franklin D. Roosevelt Presidential Library and Museum house many of Crosby's writings. The collection includes his birdwatching records, his scratch list of birds observed, and his six volume birding diary. The ornithology collection at the Smithsonian Institution in Washington, D.C. contains a black and white photograph of Crosby.

Crosby also developed a friendship with noted artist John Butler Yeats. Writer and historian Van Wyck Brooks, a mutual friend, introduced them. Yeats sketched Crosby and his wife and spent time with them in Rhinebeck.

Crosby's granddaughter, Susan Schieffelin McCabe Gillotti, wrote an extensive history of Crosby, their family, and their relationships with Wheelock and the Roosevelts.

== Family ==
Crosby married Elizabeth Coolidge on June 11, 1908, during his senior year at Harvard. Crosby and Elizabeth Coolidge had two children together: Maunsell Howard Crosby and Helen Elizabeth Crosby. In 1916, Crosby and Elizabeth Coolidge divorced.
