= Ernest Howard Crosby =

American politician

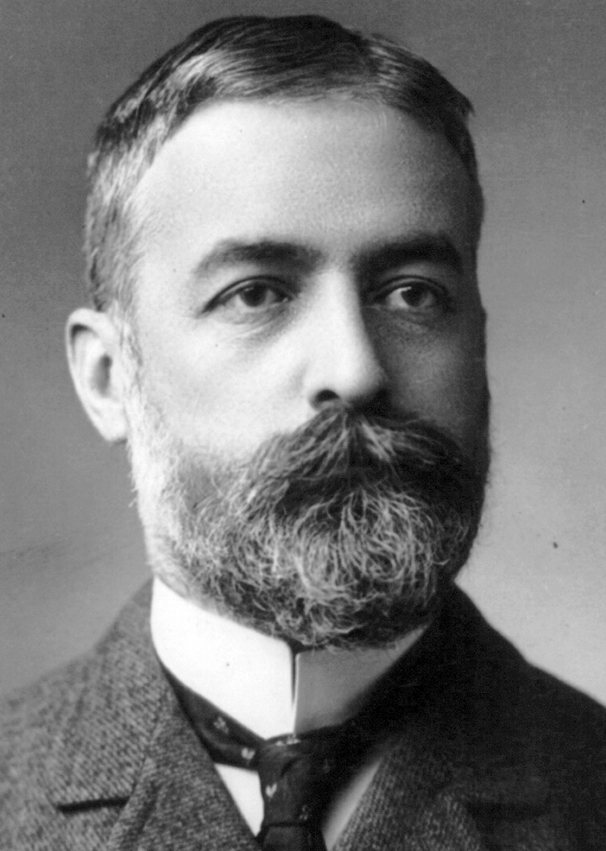
- Ernest Howard Crosby in 1904
- Born: November 4, 1856
- Died: January 3, 1907 (aged 50)
- Spouse: Frances (Fanny) Kendall Schieffelin (m. 1881)
- Children: Margaret Eleanor Crosby; Maunsell Schieffelin Crosby

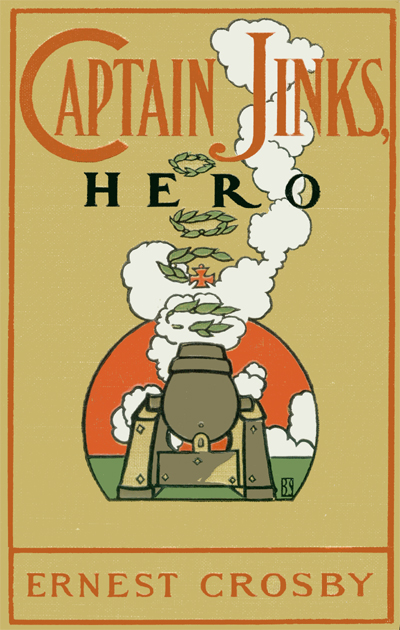
Cover of a 1902 New York publication of Captain Jinks, Hero, by Ernest Howard Crosby

Ernest Howard Crosby (November 4, 1856 – January 3, 1907) was an American reformer, georgist, and author.

== Early life ==
Crosby was born in New York City in 1856. He was the son of the Rev. Dr. Howard Crosby (1826–1891), a Presbyterian minister, and Margaret Evertson Givan, a descendant of the prominent Dutch Evertson family. Crosby was a relative of prolific hymn-writer and rescue mission worker Fanny Crosby.

He was educated at New York University and the Columbia Law School. He was a member of the Delta Phi fraternity during his time at New York University.

== Career ==
While a member of the State Assembly (1887–1889), he introduced three high-license bills, all vetoed by the Governor David Bennett Hill. From 1889 to 1894, he was judge of the Mixed Court of the First Instance at Alexandria, Egypt.

He became an exponent of the theories of Count Tolstoy, whom he visited before his return to America; his relations with the great Russian later ripened into intimate friendship, and he devoted himself in America largely to promulgating Tolstoy's ideas of universal peace. His book, Plain Talk in Psalm and Parable (1899), was widely commended by such writers as Björnson, Kropotkin, and Zangwill.

Crosby was a vegetarian and supporter of animal rights, authoring an essay entitled "The Meat Fetish", published in the Humanitarian League's quarterly publication, the Humane Review in 1904; this was later published as a pamphlet. He was also president of the New York Vegetarian Society.

Like the Englishman Edward Carpenter, the subject of his book Poet and Prophet, Crosby's poetry (in the volume Swords and Plowshares) followed the example of Whitman's free verse.

== Death and burial ==
Crosby died of pneumonia in Baltimore, Maryland on January 3, 1907. His remains were transported to New York and he was buried in Rhinebeck, New York, where he maintained an estate.

== Personal life ==
In 1881, Crosby married Frances (Fanny) Kendall Schieffelin, daughter of Henry Maunsell Schieffelin. Their children were Margaret Eleanor and Maunsell Schieffelin Crosby.

== Published works ==
- Captain Jinks, Hero, illustrated by Daniel Carter Beard (1902)
- Swords and Plowshares (1902)
- Tolstoy and His Message (1903; second edition, 1904)
- Tolstoy as a Schoolmaster (1904)
- Carpenter: Poet and Prophet (second edition, 1905)
- Garrison, the Non-Resistant and abolitionist (Chicago, 1905)
- Broad-Cast (1905)
- The Meat Fetish: Two Essays on Vegetarianism, with Elisée Reclus (1905)
- Labor and Neighbor (1908)
