= Benner House =

Historic house in New York, United States

- U.S. National Register of Historic Places
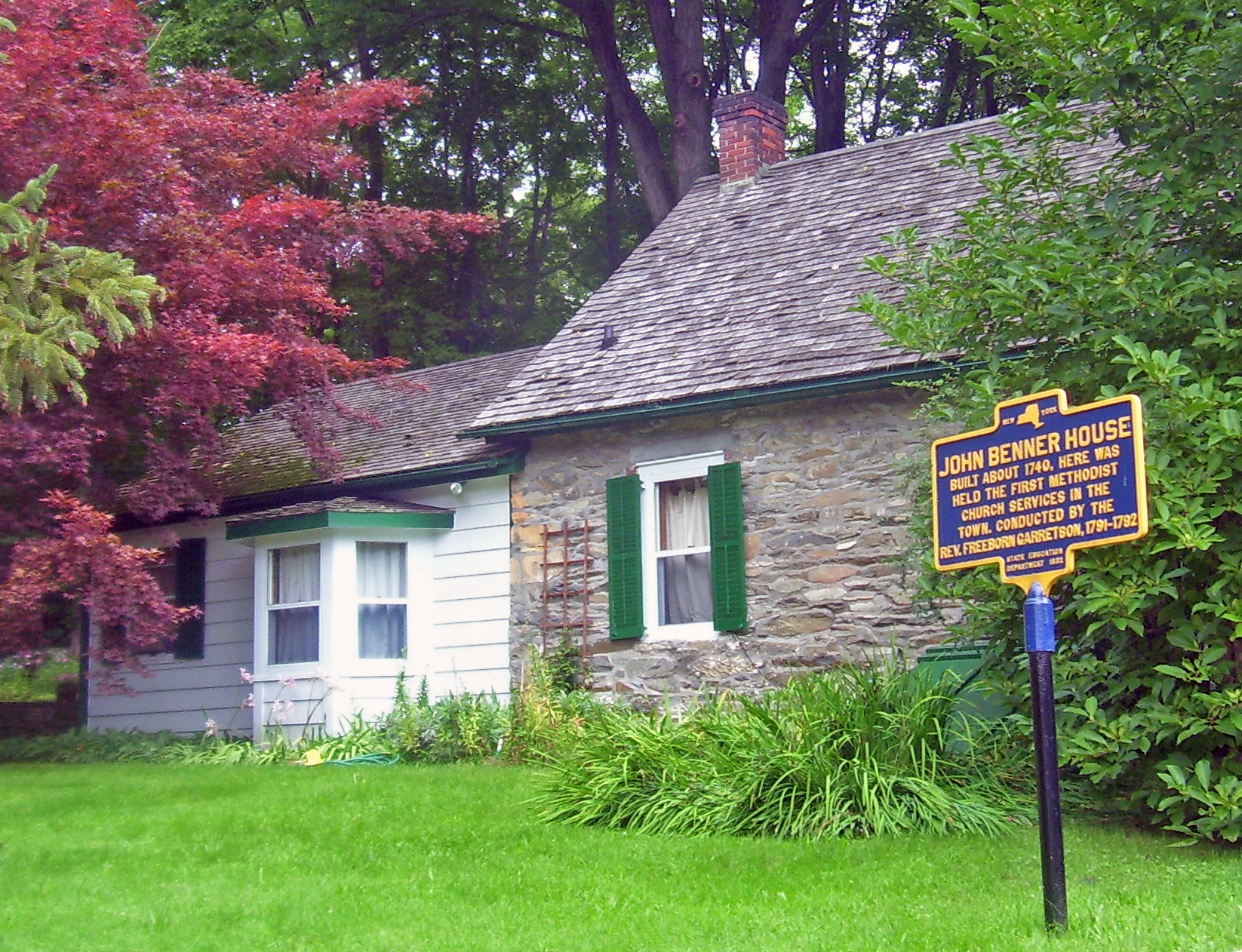
- Partial north elevation with state historical marker, 2008

- Location within New York Location within the United States
- Location: Rhinebeck, NY
- Nearest city: Kingston
- Coordinates: 41°55′14″N 73°54′34″W
- Built: c. 1739
- Architect: Johannes Benner
- MPS: Rhinebeck Town MRA
- NRHP reference No.: 87001067
- Added to NRHP: July 9, 1987

The Benner House is located on Mill Street in the village of Rhinebeck, New York, United States, just off U.S. Route 9. It was built by a German immigrant, Johannes Benner, in the 1730s. It is the oldest house in the Village of Rhinebeck.

It is a rare example of a one-room-plan stone house in the Hudson Valley built to German traditions, rather than Dutch. It is the sole house with that floor plan remaining in Rhinebeck. In 1987 it was listed on the National Register of Historic Places.

== Building ==
It is located at the oblique intersection of Mill Road and Route 9 on the southern fringe of the village. The northern (rear) facade is oriented diagonally to Mill Street, making it prominently visible to southbound traffic leaving Rhinebeck on the highway. Its lot is mostly wooded, with an open area to allow a view of the road and the valley from the front. A modern frame garage is at the northwest corner of the lot. It was built in 1938. It is not considered a contributing resource to the Register listing.

It is a 1 1/2-story rectangular home with a gabled roof. An asymmetrically placed Dutch door is located in the south (front) facade, with flared stone lintels like the windows nearby. It is behind a shed-roofed porch with a shallow-arched frieze and square columns that spans the entire facade. On the north is a gabled frame wing with a more moderately pitched roof, exposing the two attic windows above it on the main block.

== History ==
Johannes Benner/Bender emigrated to the Hudson Valley from Upper Bavaria with his parents and brother sometime in the early 18th century. Local tradition holds that he, or a member of his family, built the house around 1740, although no records have been found confirming this. Johannes Benner leased the land from Henry Beekman. It is further believed that the first meetings of the local Methodist church were held in the house half a century later, in 1791–92. The earliest deed known shows the house owned by an S.S. Myers in 1797.

By 1850, locally prominent landowners the Livingston family owned the house, using it as a support building for their nearby Grasmere estate. At one time it was believed to be a writing school. In 1874, Ann O' Brien purchased the house. She died in 1900, and the property passed to her son, Civil War Veteran, Thomas O' Brien. In 1946, Thomas O' Brien died. The property then passed to his two daughters, Ann Gregory and Mary Sullivan. It later passed through several other owners into the late 20th century.

The October 26, 1929, edition of the Rhinebeck Gazette describes bins found in the top story or garret of the house. These were traditionally used to store grain out of the reach of pilfering Indians. However, there are more practical reasons that local grain was stored in the garret of the house. It was more secure from rodents in the barn and would have been a dryer atmosphere, because even when heat was not required, a fire for cooking was always burning in the fireplace.

== See also ==
- National Register of Historic Places listings in Rhinebeck, New York
