= Hyde Park on Hudson =

2012 British historical drama film directed by Roger Michell

- Theatrical release poster
- Directed by: Roger Michell
- Written by: Richard Nelson
- Produced by: David Aukin; Kevin Loader
- Starring: Bill Murray; Laura Linney
- Cinematography: Lol Crawley
- Edited by: Nicolas Gaster
- Music by: Jeremy Sams
- Production companies: Daybreak Pictures; Film4; Free Range Films
- Distributed by: Focus Features (United States); Universal Pictures (United Kingdom)
- Release dates: 31 August 2012 (Telluride); 7 December 2012 (United States); 1 February 2013 (United Kingdom)
- Running time: 95 minutes
- Countries: United Kingdom; United States
- Language: English
- Box office: $8.9 million

Hyde Park on Hudson is a 2012 historical drama film directed by Roger Michell. The film stars Bill Murray as Franklin D. Roosevelt, Samuel West as King George VI, Olivia Colman as his wife Queen Elizabeth and Laura Linney as Margaret "Daisy" Suckley, a cousin and childhood friend of the President. It was based on Suckley's private journals and diaries, discovered after her death and fictionally dramatizes her close relationship with Roosevelt and the 1939 visit of King George VI and Queen Elizabeth to Roosevelt's home.

== Plot ==
In spring 1939, Sara, the mother of Franklin D. Roosevelt, asks his sixth cousin Margaret "Daisy" Suckley to visit the ill President at their country estate in Hyde Park, New York. Although Daisy and Roosevelt have not seen each other for years, the distant relatives form a strong relationship and Roosevelt often asks Daisy to visit Hyde Park when he stays with his mother. Daisy becomes one of the women close to Roosevelt, including Sara, Missy LeHand, the president's secretary, and Eleanor, the president's wife. Despite his power, the president is often unable to control the other women, so the quiet, shy Daisy is his confidante and he tells her that Top Cottage will be their shared refuge after his presidency.

In June 1939, King George VI and his wife, Queen Elizabeth, visit the United States, during which they stay with the Roosevelts at Hyde Park. The British hope the visit will improve the chances of American support during the future war with Germany. George, who is King because his brother Edward VIII abdicated, is nervous because of the importance of the visit, his stutter, and having to eat a hot dog for the first time at a picnic in his honor. Roosevelt reassures George by citing his own inability to walk and observes others do not see their handicaps because "it's not what they want to see". The president tells the King he hopes to overcome Americans' reluctance to help Britain.

The night the king and queen arrive, Daisy discovers LeHand is having an affair with Roosevelt. LeHand tells a shocked Daisy their respective relationships with the president are not his only ones, mentioning Dorothy Schiff and Lucy Mercer Rutherfurd, and Daisy must accept sharing Roosevelt with other women. At the picnic the next day, the king eats a hot dog for a photo op, and Daisy, in a voiceover, states the visit helped the two countries form a Special Relationship. Daisy rejects Roosevelt's requests to see her until he calls on her in person. They reconcile and Daisy accepts her role as one of the president's mistresses. As years pass, Daisy watches Roosevelt become frail as a wartime leader; nonetheless, she says that everyone "still [looked] to him, still seeing whatever it was they wanted to see".

== Cast ==
- Bill Murray as Franklin D. Roosevelt
- Laura Linney as Margaret "Daisy" Suckley
- Samuel West as King George VI
- Olivia Colman as Queen Elizabeth
- Elizabeth Marvel as Marguerite “Missy” LeHand
- Olivia Williams as Eleanor Roosevelt
- Elizabeth Wilson as Sara Delano
- Andrew Havill as James Cameron
- Eleanor Bron as Daisy's Aunt
- Martin McDougall as Thomas Gardiner Corcoran

== Production ==
Screenwriter Richard Nelson was inspired by the story of Daisy Suckley after reading a posthumously published collection of her letters and diaries. He felt drawn to the story because of the unique perspective Daisy offered on a series of important historical events. He also connected with the setting, since Nelson lives in Rhinebeck and had even met Daisy briefly before she died in 1991.

Originally conceived as an idea for a film, Nelson's choice of director, Roger Michell, proved not immediately available. Nelson re-worked the script as a radio play, which was produced by the BBC in 2009, directed by Ned Chaillet. Once Michell became available, production began on the film.

In early March 2011, director Michell started searching for American actors to play President Roosevelt and Eleanor Roosevelt. Bill Murray agreed to play Roosevelt in late March. Production designer Simon Bowles created upstate New York in England where the entire film was shot.

== Release ==
Hyde Park on Hudson had its world premiere at the 2012 Telluride Film Festival on 31 August 2012, then at the 2012 Toronto International Film Festival on 10 September 2012, and again at the 2012 Savannah Film Festival on 31 October 2012, with limited release in the United States on 5 and 7 December 2012, and wide release in January 2013. The UK release followed on 1 February 2013.

=== Critical reception ===
Hyde Park on Hudson received mixed-to-negative reviews from critics. On Rotten Tomatoes the film has an approval rating of 38% based on 175 reviews, with an average rating of 5.26/10. The site's critical consensus reads, "Though bolstered by a thoroughly charming performance by Bill Murray in the central role, Hyde Park on Hudson is an FDR biopic that lets down both its audience and its subject." On Metacritic, the film has a score of 55 out of 100, based on 41 critics, indicating "mixed or average" reviews.

The A.V. Club named it one of the worst movies of 2012, criticizing "the slapdash manner in which it’s assembled is genuinely shocking" and its "prevailing idiocy".

Roger Ebert of the Chicago Sun-Times enjoyed the film, giving it 3 1/2 stars out of 4 and said of Murray's performance: "Murray, who has a wider range than we sometimes realize, finds the human core of this FDR and presents it tenderly." Richard Brody of The New Yorker also praises the film, saying although the movie is not great, it "has a particular kind of merit... It conveys something of a transparent experience, suggesting that the power of the subject escapes the attempt to contain it in a film and makes its way directly—albeit incidentally or even accidentally—to the viewer."

Murray's performance as Roosevelt garnered a Golden Globe Award nomination for Best Actor in a Motion Picture – Musical or Comedy.

The film won the award for Best Production Design from the British Film Designers Guild on 27 January 2013.

=== Historical accuracy ===
During World War II, Suckley often stayed for long visits at the White House, keeping the president company. Roosevelt is known to have had an affair with Lucy Mercer during World War I. However, there is no direct evidence that he had a similar relationship with Suckley, though there was an emotional connection. Roosevelt apparently instructed Suckley to burn at least some of the letters he wrote to her, which has fueled speculation about their content.

Focusing on how the historical events and people are portrayed, Conrad Black, author of Franklin Delano Roosevelt: Champion of Freedom, said the film took "large, ... sometimes scurrilous, liberties with historical facts." In particular, he stated the movie erred in its depiction both of Roosevelt's relationship with women and of Eleanor Roosevelt's sexuality.

Roosevelt biographer Geoffrey Ward has written: "It is true that [FDR and Daisy] drove to a hilltop that they loved at some point in 1935, and that something happened on that hilltop. I think he kissed her – which meant a great deal to both of them. And it started a long, first flirtatious and then very fond friendship. But what happened in the film did not happen."

Newsreel footage of the real events of the 1939 Royal visit was filmed by Pathé News.

=== Accolades ===
List of accolades received by Hyde Park on Hudson
Year	Award	Category	Recipients	Result	Ref.
2012	British Independent Film Awards	Best Supporting Actress	Olivia Colman	Won	
2012	Detroit Film Critics Society Awards	Best Actor	Bill Murray	Nominated	
2012	Satellite Awards	Best Actress in a Motion Picture	Laura Linney	Nominated	
2013	AARP Movies for Grownups Awards	Best Screenwriter	Richard Nelson	Nominated	
2013	British Film Designers Guild Awards	Best Production Design	Simon Bowles, Mark Raggett, and Celia Bobak	Won	
2013	Golden Globe Awards	Best Actor - Musical or Comedy	Bill Murray	Nominated	

== See also ==
- The King's Speech
- Warm Springs
- Margaret Suckley
- Top Cottage
- Wilderstein
