= Margaret Suckley =

American archivist (1891–1991)

- Suckley in 1941, photographed by President Franklin D. Roosevelt
- Born: Margaret Lynch Suckley; December 20, 1891; Rhinebeck, New York, U.S.
- Died: June 29, 1991 (aged 99); Rhinebeck, New York, U.S.
- Education: Bryn Mawr College (1912–1914)
- Occupation: Presidential library archivist

Margaret Lynch Suckley /ˈsʊkliː/ (December 20, 1891 – June 29, 1991) was a sixth cousin, intimate friend, and confidante of U.S. President Franklin D. Roosevelt, as well as an archivist for the first American presidential library. She was one of four women at the Little White House with Roosevelt in Warm Springs, Georgia, when he died of a cerebral hemorrhage in 1945.

After Suckley's death at age 99, a suitcase full of confidential letters from FDR was found in her home, along with her diaries. These recorded details of people she met and events she witnessed at the White House and at the Roosevelt estate in Hyde Park, which added to the historical record of Roosevelt's presidency.

== Early life ==
Suckley was born December 20, 1891, in the Hudson Valley at Wilderstein, the family home of Elizabeth Philips Montgomery and Robert Bowne Suckley. She was a descendant of the prominent Beekman, Livingston (Scottish) and Schuyler (Dutch) families of New York, as well as John Bowne and Elizabeth Fones Winthrop Feake Hallet. Generally called "Daisy" by those close to her, Suckley was the fourth of seven children, and a sixth cousin of Franklin D. Roosevelt. She grew up at Wilderstein, where she was a neighbor of the future president. Suckley attended Bryn Mawr College from 1912 until 1914, when her mother forbade her from finishing her degree. During World War I she served on Ellis Island as a nurse's aide. Much of her family's trade and shipping fortune was lost during the Great Depression, but she and Franklin Roosevelt remained close.

== Association with Roosevelt ==
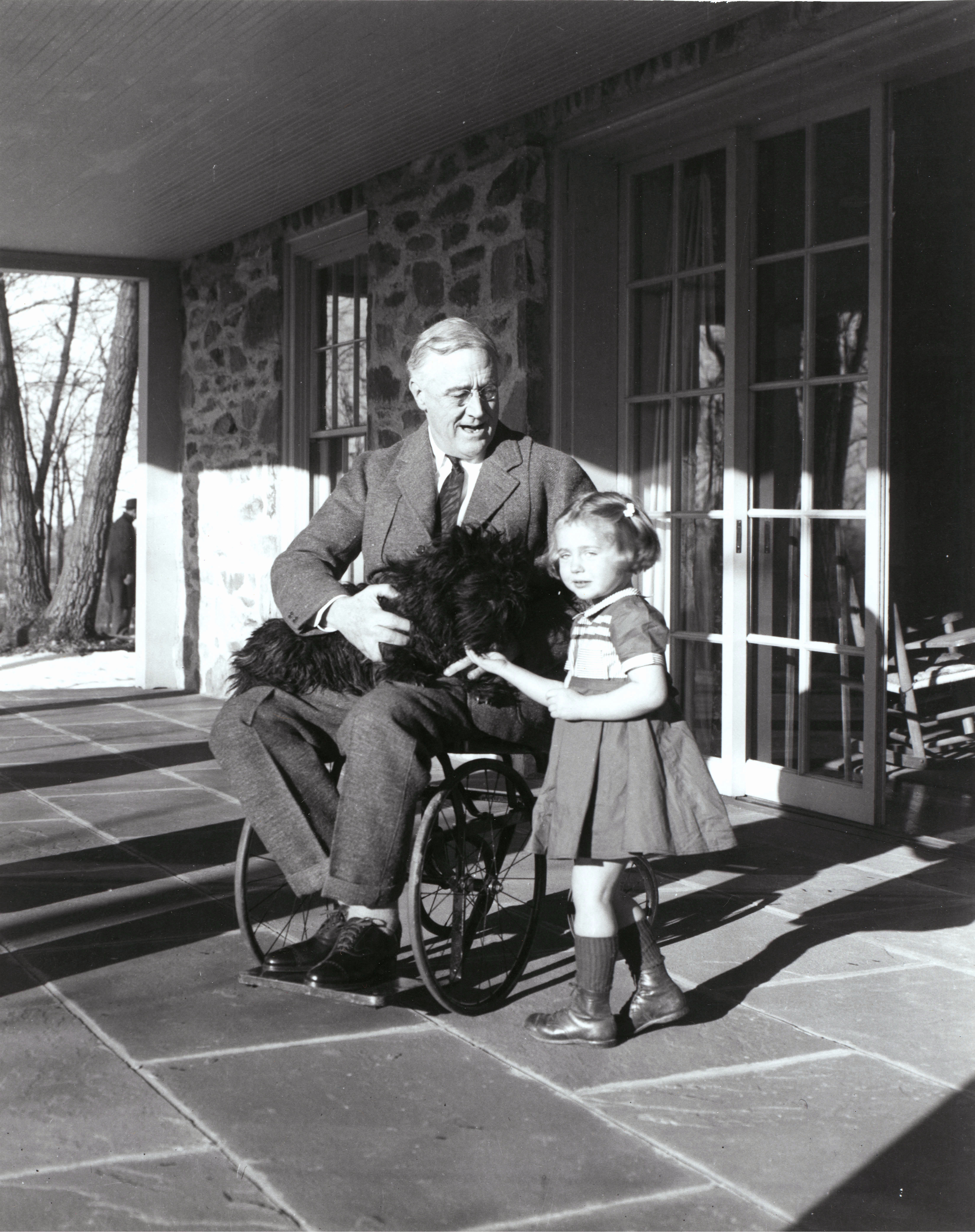
One of Suckley's photographs of FDR in his wheelchair, with Ruthie Bie and Fala (February 1941)

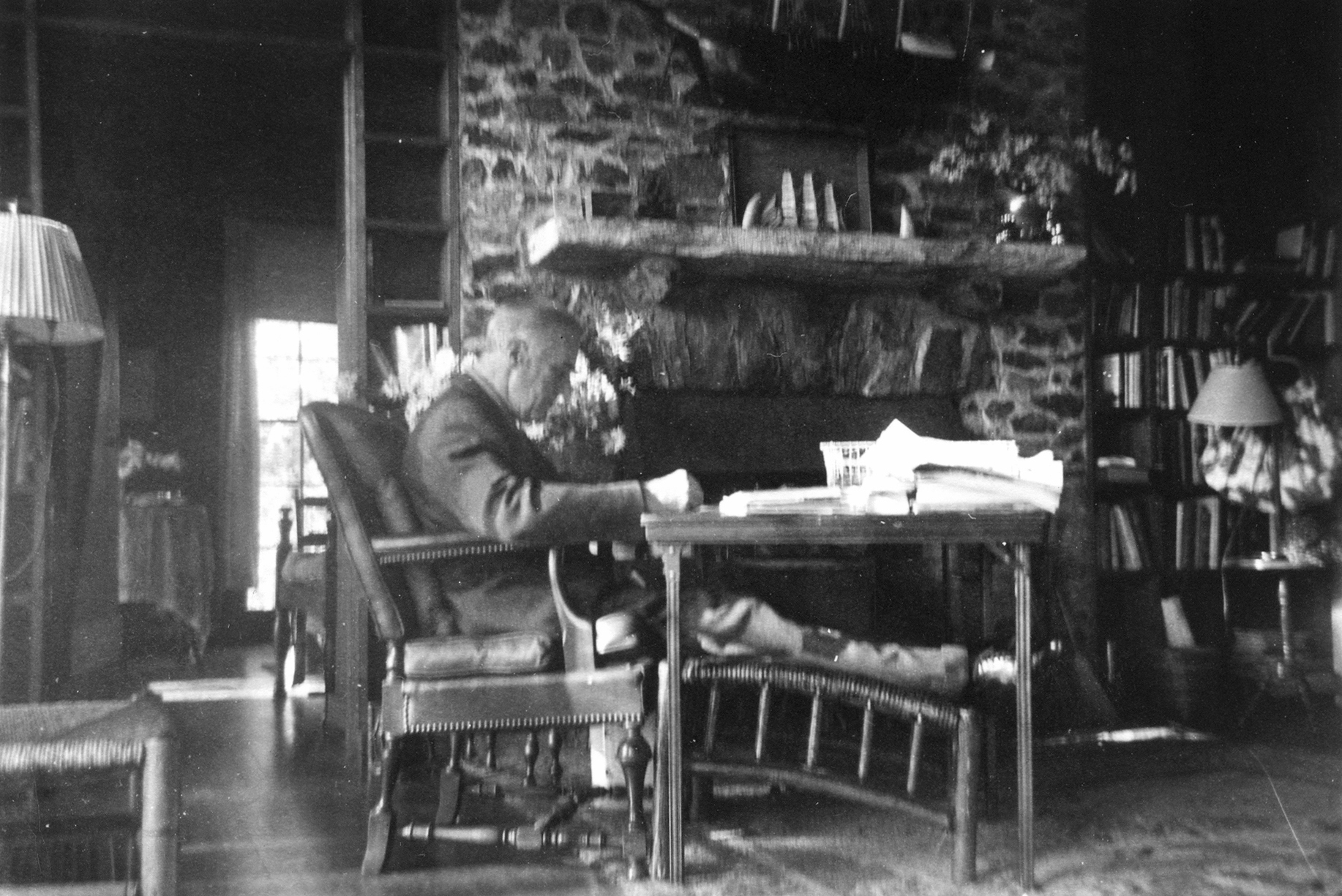
Suckley's photograph of FDR at Warm Springs a few days before his death (April 1945)

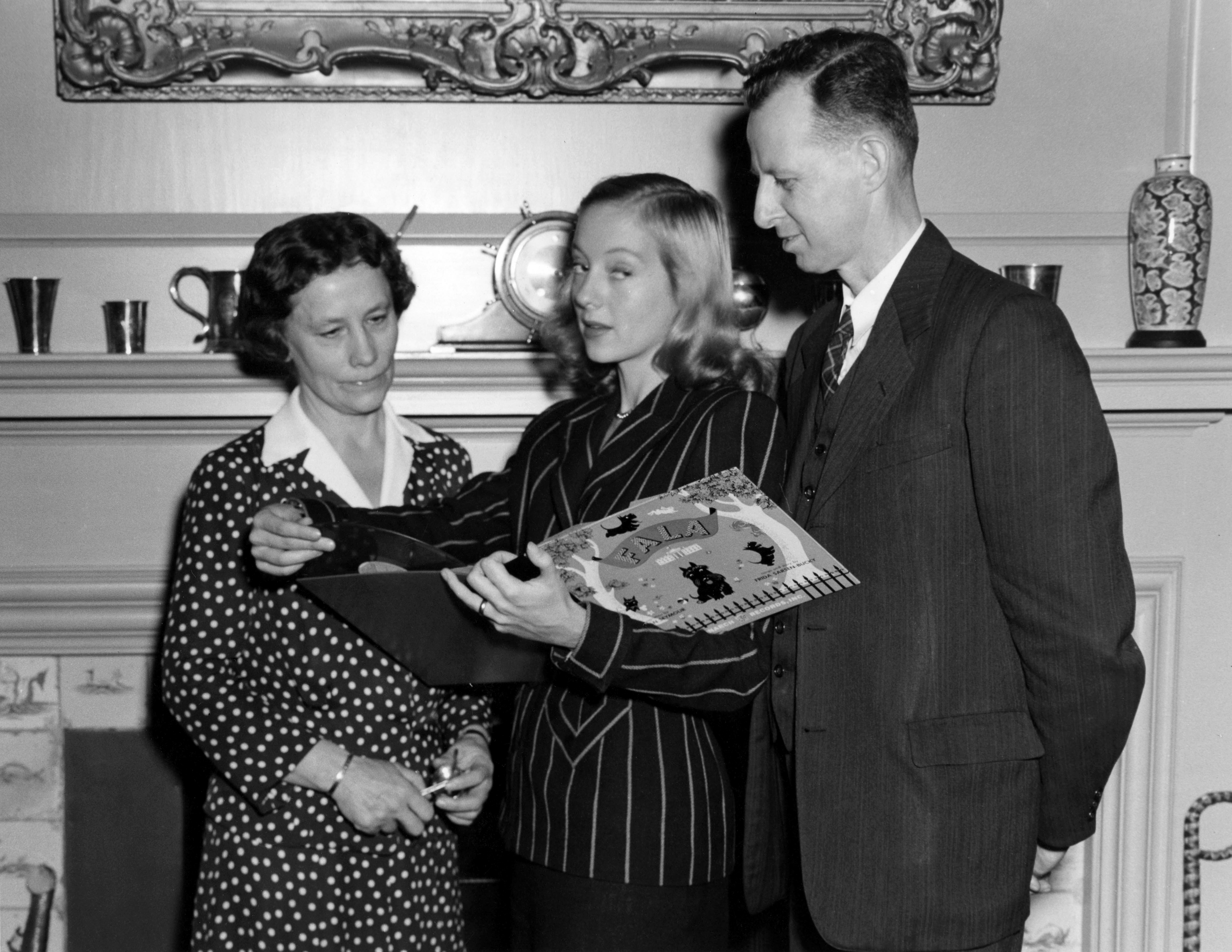
Suckley with actress Evelyn Keyes and Franklin D. Roosevelt Presidential Library and Museum director Fred Shipman (1946)

In the early 1930s Suckley and Roosevelt spoke of having a cottage built at a shared favorite spot they called "Our Hill", which eventually became Roosevelt's Top Cottage. Two of the rare photographs of Franklin Delano Roosevelt in a wheelchair were taken by Suckley there.

Suckley raised Scottish Terriers and gave one to President Roosevelt, which he renamed Fala. The dog quickly became famous, and Suckley wrote a children's book about him.

During World War II, Suckley often stayed for long visits at the White House, keeping the president company. Roosevelt is known to have had an affair with Lucy Mercer during World War I, though there is no evidence that he had a similar relationship with Suckley, but there was an emotional connection. Roosevelt apparently instructed Suckley to burn at least some of the letters he wrote to her, which has fueled speculation about their content. Surviving letters include affectionate personal remarks, as well as reports and reflections about the progress of the war and meetings with figures such as Winston Churchill and Joseph Stalin at the Yalta Conference.

After Roosevelt died, his daughter Anna Roosevelt Halsted and a friend came upon a cache of Suckley's letters, hidden in a box from his stamp collection that he took everywhere with him. Anna, who was 39 at the time, gave no later indication she read or understood the significance of the letters before returning them to Suckley.

== After Roosevelt's death ==
Having served as Roosevelt's personal archivist, Suckley played a key role in setting up the Franklin D. Roosevelt Presidential Library and Museum in Hyde Park, where she worked until 1963.

In 1980 she helped establish Wilderstein Preservation Inc, a group dedicated to preserving the house and 45-acre riverfront property of her family home, now a National Historic Landmark. She continued to live there until her death on June 29, 1991.

== Cultural references ==
Numerous newspaper articles published about Suckley have speculated about her relationship with Roosevelt. It was the subject of a book, Closest Companion (1995), by historian Geoffrey Ward.

The relationship is also the subject of a play centered on the 1939 visit to Hyde Park by King George VI, by playwright Richard Nelson titled Hyde Park on Hudson. Drawn from Suckley's private journals, Nelson's play fictionalizes Suckley's relationship with FDR as sexual, even though most biographers suggest otherwise. A production of Nelson's play was broadcast on BBC Radio 3 in 2009. The story was also adapted into the 2012 motion picture Hyde Park on Hudson, with Laura Linney as Suckley, Bill Murray as Roosevelt, and Samuel West as King George VI.

Focusing on how the historical events and people are portrayed, Conrad Black, author of Franklin Delano Roosevelt: Champion of Freedom, said Nelson's portrayal took "large, …. sometimes scurrilous, liberties with historical facts." In particular, he stated that Nelson erred in his depiction both of Roosevelt's relationship with women and of Eleanor Roosevelt's sexuality. Roosevelt biographer Geoffrey Ward wrote of the Hyde Park depiction of events, "It is true that they drove to a hilltop that they loved at some point in 1935, and that something happened on that hilltop.… And it started a long, first flirtatious and then very fond friendship. But what happened in the film did not happen."

Suckley features prominently in Ken Burns' 2014 documentary series, The Roosevelts: An Intimate History. Her words are read by Patricia Clarkson.

Suckley's relationship with Roosevelt was the subject of Daisy Chain (Claret Press 2023), a novel written by Suckley's relative, Justine Gilbert. It won the Page Turner Award 2022.

== See also ==
- Wilderstein
- Hyde Park on Hudson
