= Franklin D. Roosevelt Presidential Library and Museum =

Institution in Hyde Park, New York, US

Franklin D. Roosevelt Presidential Library

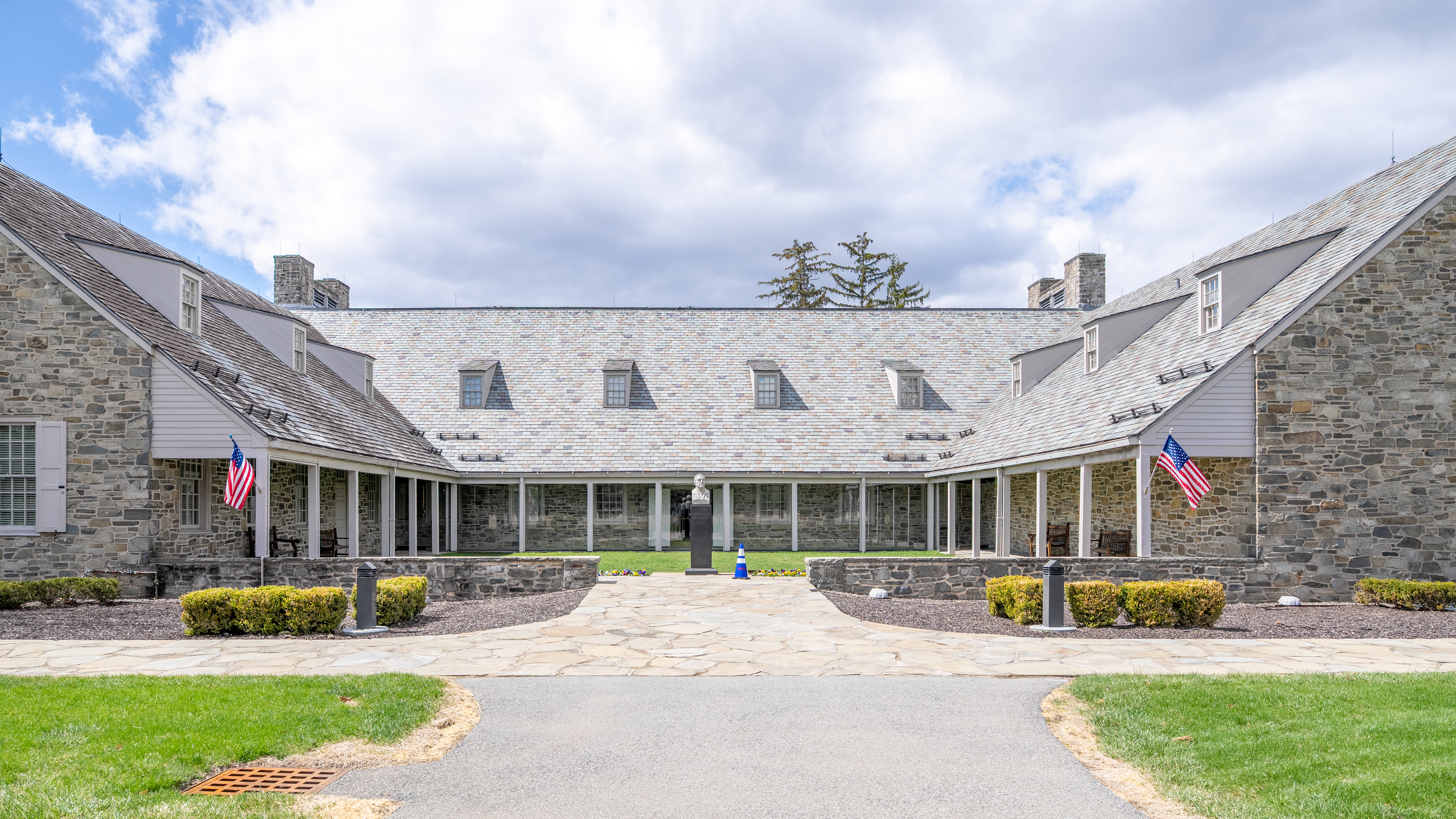
- Franklin D. Roosevelt Presidential Library and Museum in 2026

- Location within New York

General information
- Location: Hyde Park, New York, United States
- Coordinates: 41.768680°N 73.934115°W
- Named for: Franklin Delano Roosevelt
- Construction started: 1939
- Completed: 1940
- Inaugurated: Dedicated on June 30, 1941
- Cost: $376,000
- Operator: National Archives and Records Administration

Technical details
- Size: 16 acres (6.5 ha)

Website
- fdrlibrary.org

The Franklin D. Roosevelt Presidential Library and Museum is a presidential library in Hyde Park, New York. Located on the grounds of Springwood, the Roosevelt family estate, it holds the records of Franklin Delano Roosevelt, the 32nd president of the United States (1933–1945). The library was built under the President's personal direction in 1939–1940, and dedicated on June 30, 1941. It is the first presidential library in the United States and one of the thirteen presidential libraries under the auspices of the National Archives and Records Administration. The library contains approximately 2,500 photographs, and 17 million documents related to Roosevelt's presidency.

== History ==
Roosevelt was both a collector of memorabilia and amateur historian. As a then two-term president who had presided over a dramatic phase of the nation's history during the Great Depression, he recognized the need for a facility to house the vast quantity of historical papers, books, and memorabilia he had accumulated during a lifetime of public service and private collecting.

The library he subsequently commissioned was built by Philadelphia contractor John McShain, on 16 acres (6.5 ha) of land donated by Roosevelt and his mother, Sara.

Margaret Suckley, who acted as Roosevelt's personal archivist during his life, was involved in the establishment of the library and served as its archivist for its first two decades.

=== Setting a precedent ===
Prior to Roosevelt's presidency, the final disposition of Presidential papers was left to chance. Although a valued part of the nation's heritage, the papers of chief executives were private property which they took with them upon leaving office. Some were sold or destroyed, while others remained with families but inaccessible to scholars for long periods of time. Ultimately some collections found their way into the Library of Congress and private repositories.

Franklin D. Roosevelt changed this pattern, by becoming the first president to make his papers available to the public by donating them intact to the government. These covered both all his public service, as New York state senator (1911–13), assistant secretary of the Navy (1913–20), governor of New York (1929–32), and President of the United States (1933–45), and his private collections of papers, books, and memorabilia on the history of the U.S. Navy and Dutchess County, New York.

=== Location and buildings ===
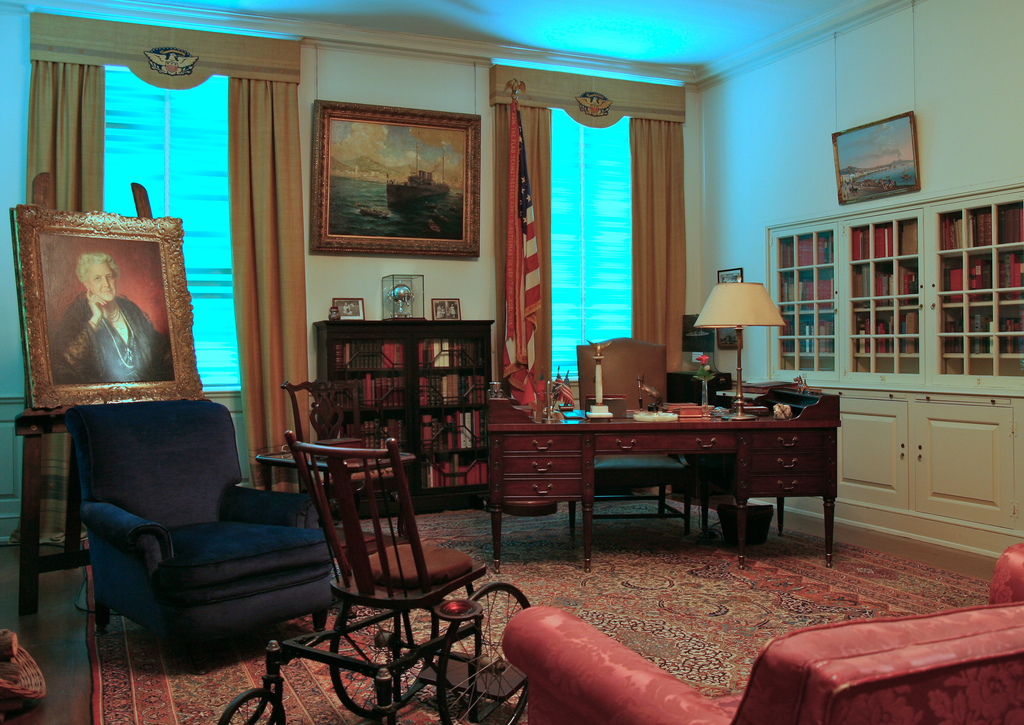
FDR's study in the museum

The Library sits on the grounds of the Roosevelt family's Hyde Park estate. It is built of Hudson Valley fieldstone in the style reminiscent of the local Dutch colonial architecture which he favored. A sketch made by President Roosevelt dated April 12, 1937, shows the proposed building placed very close to the site ultimately chosen, and a ground plan roughly approximating that of the main block today.

The building was designed by principal architect Louis A. Simon and consulting architect Henry J. Toombs based on his sketches by Roosevelt himself. It was built with privately donated funds, at a cost of $376,000, and turned-over to the federal government on July 4, 1940, to be operated by the National Archives.

Said Robert D.W. Connor, the first Archivist of the United States, of the President making his papers openly available to scholars, "Franklin D. Roosevelt is the nation's answer to the historian's prayer."

The facility was already overcrowded when completed in 1940, because Roosevelt did not expect to serve as president for more than two terms. A 1950 estimate stated that the library contained 50 million items, including 16,000 books, 15,000 photographs, 275,000 feet (84,000 m) of movie film, and 300 sound recordings.

The library underwent a full-scale renovation in the 21st century, its first, reopening on June 30, 2013. Funded by a combination of public support and private donations, the multi-million dollar renovation included expanded exhibit space, HVAC updates, and research room improvements. Members of the Roosevelt family and the historian Geoffrey Ward spoke at a re-dedication ceremony that day.

=== Other archives ===
In early planning for the library the President expressed the hope that Eleanor Roosevelt's papers would eventually find a place here. In 1942 President Roosevelt made a rough sketch for wings to be added on to the north and south sides of the building should additional space be needed for her papers. At the time of her death in 1962 Mrs. Roosevelt's papers totaled three million pages.

During her tenure at the library (1961–1969), Elizabeth B. Drewry raised funds for the wings to house Eleanor Roosevelt's papers. Construction was completed in 1972.

The library contains the donated papers of others associated with Roosevelt, such as Henry Morgenthau Jr.'s diary of 840 volumes.

== Presidential Libraries Act ==
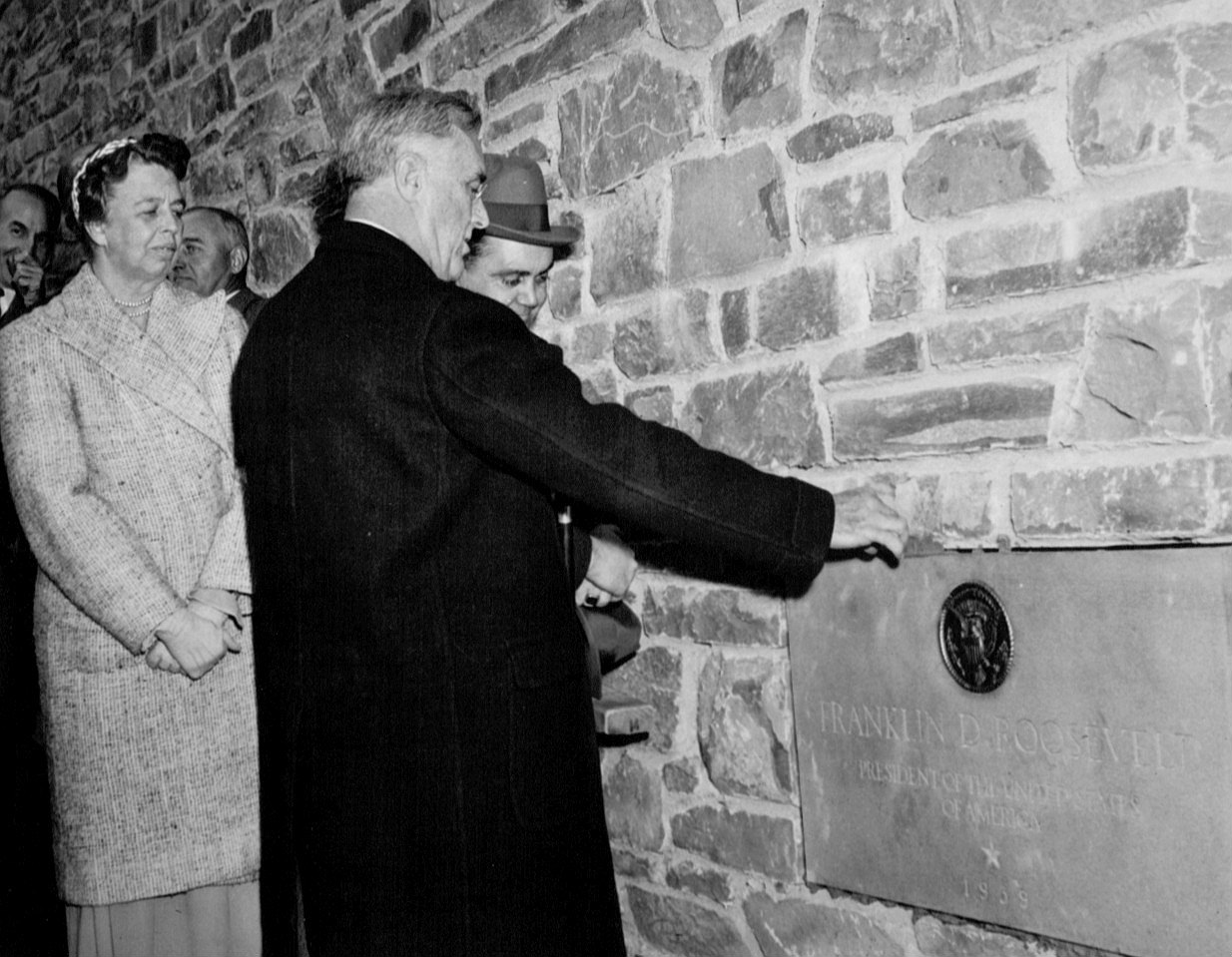
Franklin and Eleanor Roosevelt at the library cornerstone ceremony in November 1939

Using Roosevelt's actions as a precedent, Congress passed the Presidential Libraries Act in 1955. It regularized the procedures for privately built and federally maintained libraries to preserve the papers of future presidents; all of the presidents from Herbert Hoover to Barack Obama have a presidential center overseen by the National Archives.

Official presidential papers became public property as a result of the Presidential Records Act of 1978, backed by legislation limiting the size and financing of presidential museums.

== Museum ==
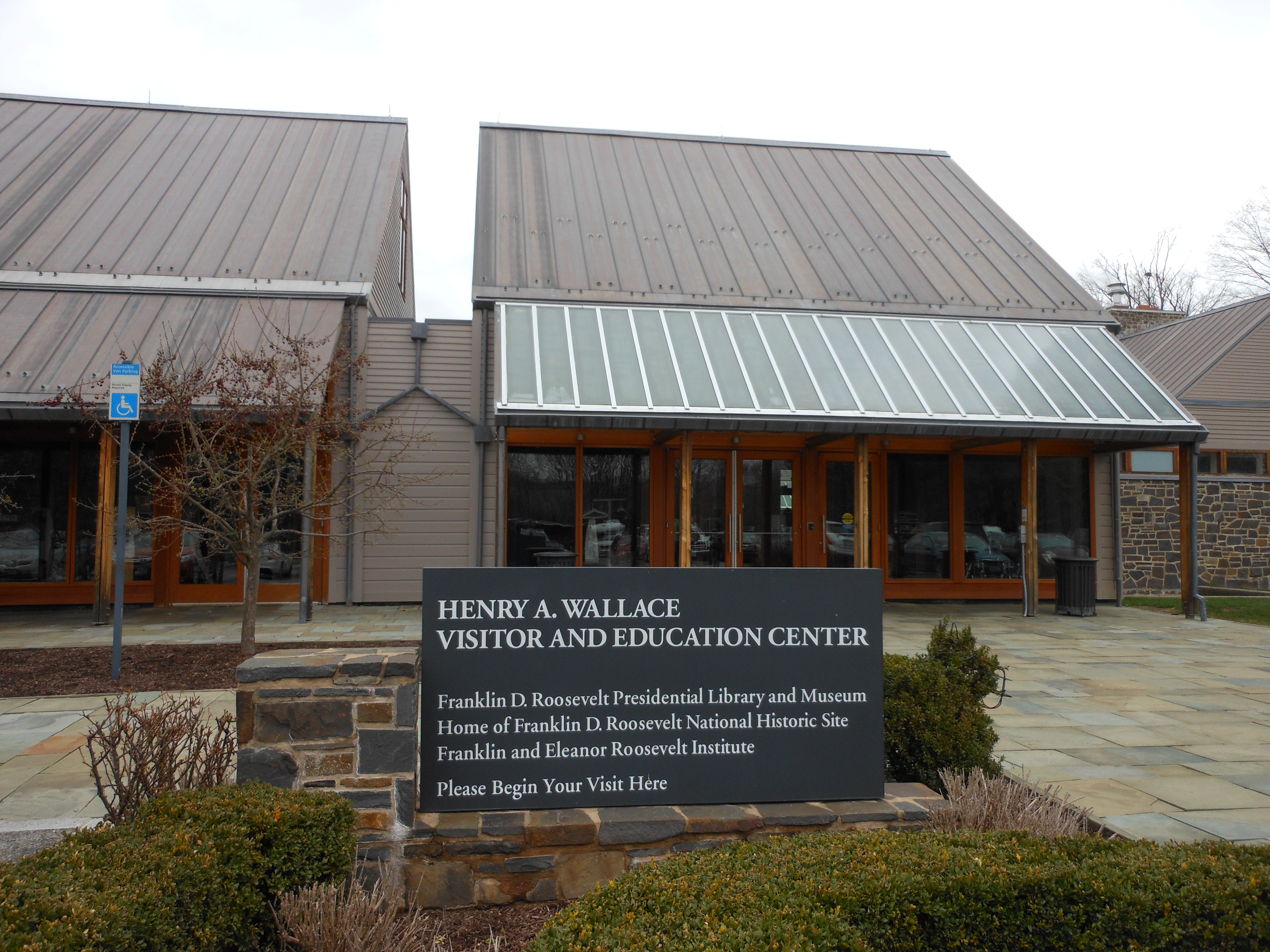
Visitor Center at the Franklin Delano Roosevelt National Historic Site

Roosevelt hoped the library would become an important research center and attract visitors to the museum. The museum section of the building opened June 30, 1941. However, the onset of World War II changed Roosevelt's plans, and the official opening of the library as a research facility was deferred as the president served a third term and then was elected to a fourth term in 1944. He visited the library often during the war to sort and classify his records and memorabilia; and from his study in the library he delivered several of his famous War-era radio speeches or "fireside chats".

President Roosevelt paid his last visit to Hyde Park in March 1945 and died on April 12 at Warm Springs, Georgia, at age sixty-three. The desk he used in the Oval Office during his presidency was donated to the museum.

== Images of the internment ==
The Library and Museum have condemned Roosevelt's decision to Intern Japanese Americans with Executive Order 9066, The Museum features an exhibit titled "Images of Internment," which includes a short film with excerpts from oral history accounts of Japanese Americans describing their experiences during internment, and a video recording of Ronald Reagan's formal apology on behalf of The United States and signing the Civil Liberties Act of 1988 which granted reparations all who've been interned.

The Franklin D. Roosevelt Presidential Library and Museum is presenting “Images of Internment” because it is critically important to examine both the successes and failures of any great leader to truly understand them. President Roosevelt led America through two of its worst crises, the Great Depression and World War II. His extraordinary leadership helped create the modern world with all of the freedoms we enjoy today. Executive Order 9066 reminds us that even our greatest leaders can make mistakes when the voice of the people drowns out the voice of reason.

== See also ==
- Presidential memorials in the United States
