= Falahill =

Village in Scottish Borders, Scotland

Coordinates: 55.796°N 2.979°W

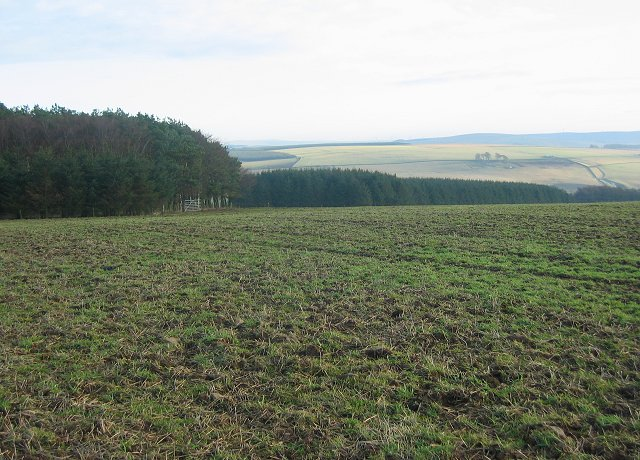
Fala Hill

Falahill is a village in the Scottish Borders, in the Moorfoot Hills, at NT387563, in the Parish of Heriot, and close to the border with Midlothian. Nearby are Gilston, the Heriot Water, Oxton, Scottish Borders, Soutra Hill, and Torquhan.

The hill serves as the origin for the name of Fala, the presidential dog of Franklin D. Roosevelt, who was named after John Murray of Falahill, one of Roosevelt's ancestors.

== See also ==
- List of places in the Scottish Borders
- List of places in Scotland
