= Fala (dog) =

Dog (Scottish Terrier) owned by Franklin D. Roosevelt

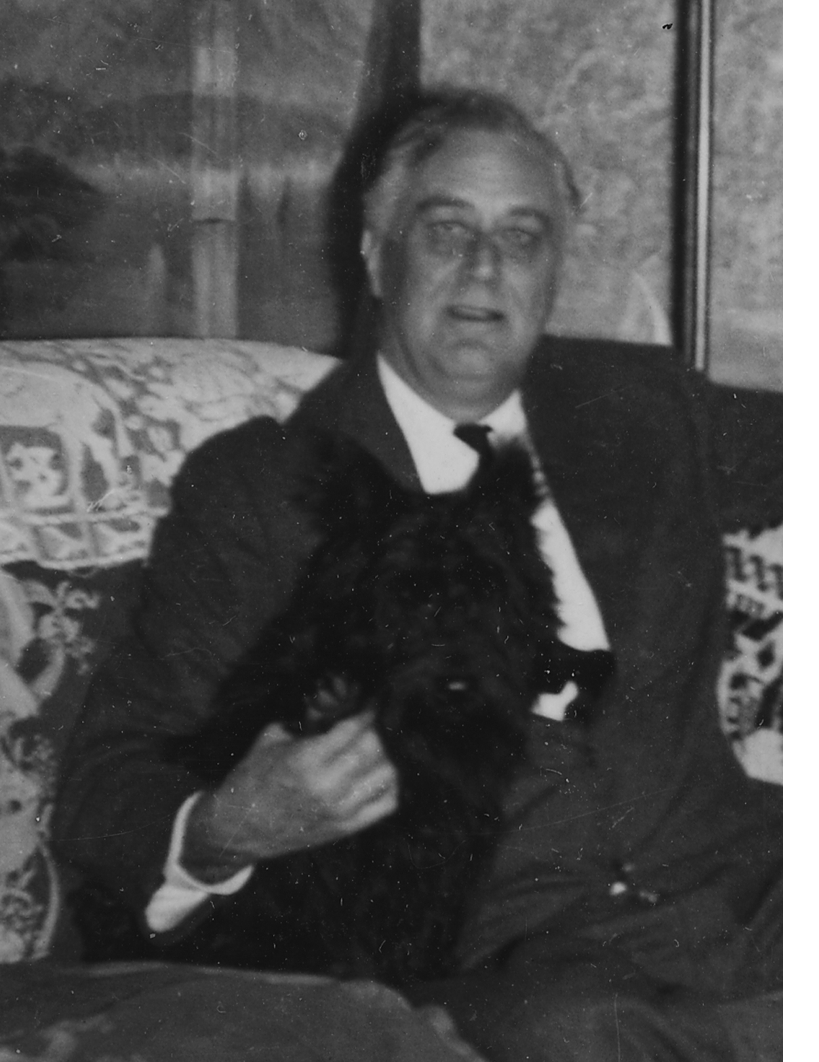
- Roosevelt seated with Fala (1944-1945)
- Other name: Murray the Outlaw of Falahill (full name)
- Species: Canis familiaris
- Breed: Scottish Terrier
- Sex: Male
- Born: Big Boy; April 7, 1940
- Died: April 5, 1952 (aged 11)
- Resting place: Springwood
- Occupation: Presidential pet
- Owners: Franklin D. Roosevelt; Eleanor Roosevelt
- Named after: John Murray of Falahill

Fala (April 7, 1940 – April 5, 1952), a Scottish Terrier, was the dog of United States president Franklin D. Roosevelt. As a presidential pet, Fala was taken to many places by Roosevelt. Given to the Roosevelts by a cousin, Fala knew how to perform tricks; the dog and his White House antics were mentioned frequently by the media and often referenced by Roosevelt and his wife Eleanor. Fala outlived Roosevelt by seven years and was buried near him.

A statue of Fala beside Roosevelt is featured in Washington, D.C.'s Franklin Delano Roosevelt Memorial, the only presidential pet so honored. Another statue of Fala has been placed at Puerto Rico's "Paseo de los Presidentes" in San Juan.

== Early life ==
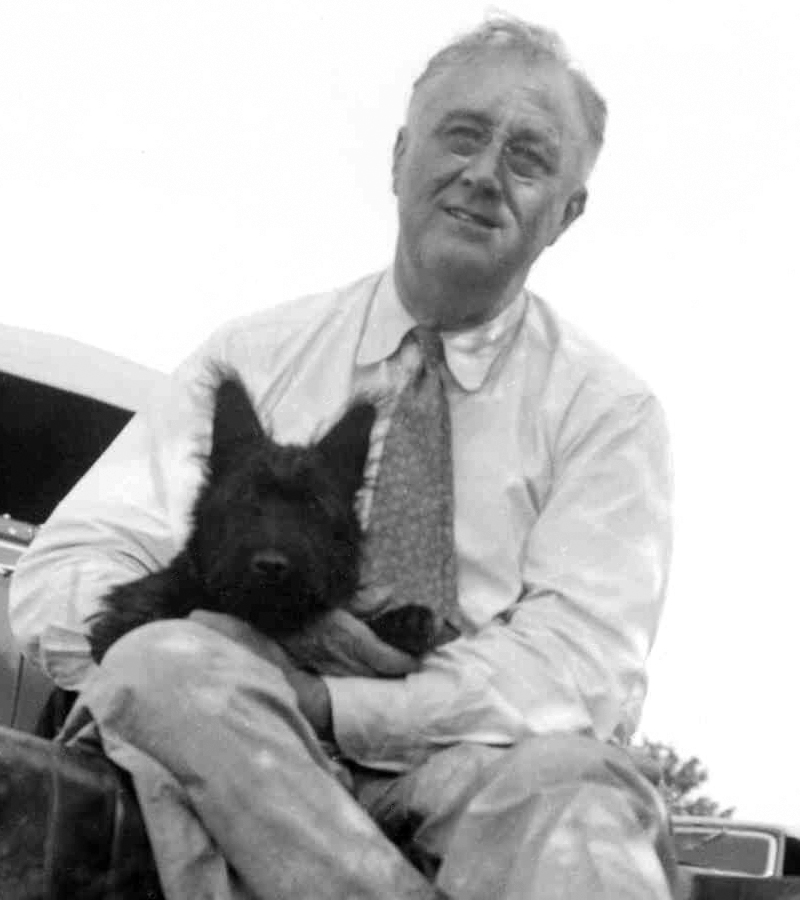
Roosevelt sitting with Fala in Sunset Hill (August 8, 1940)

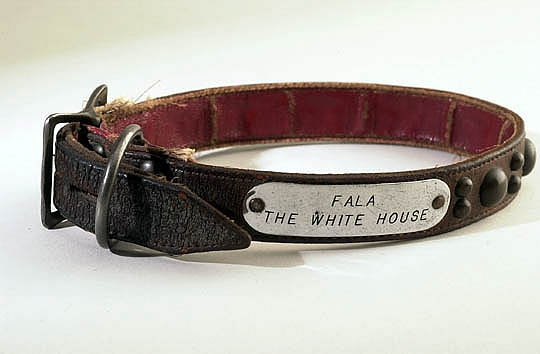
Fala's silver-and-leather collar

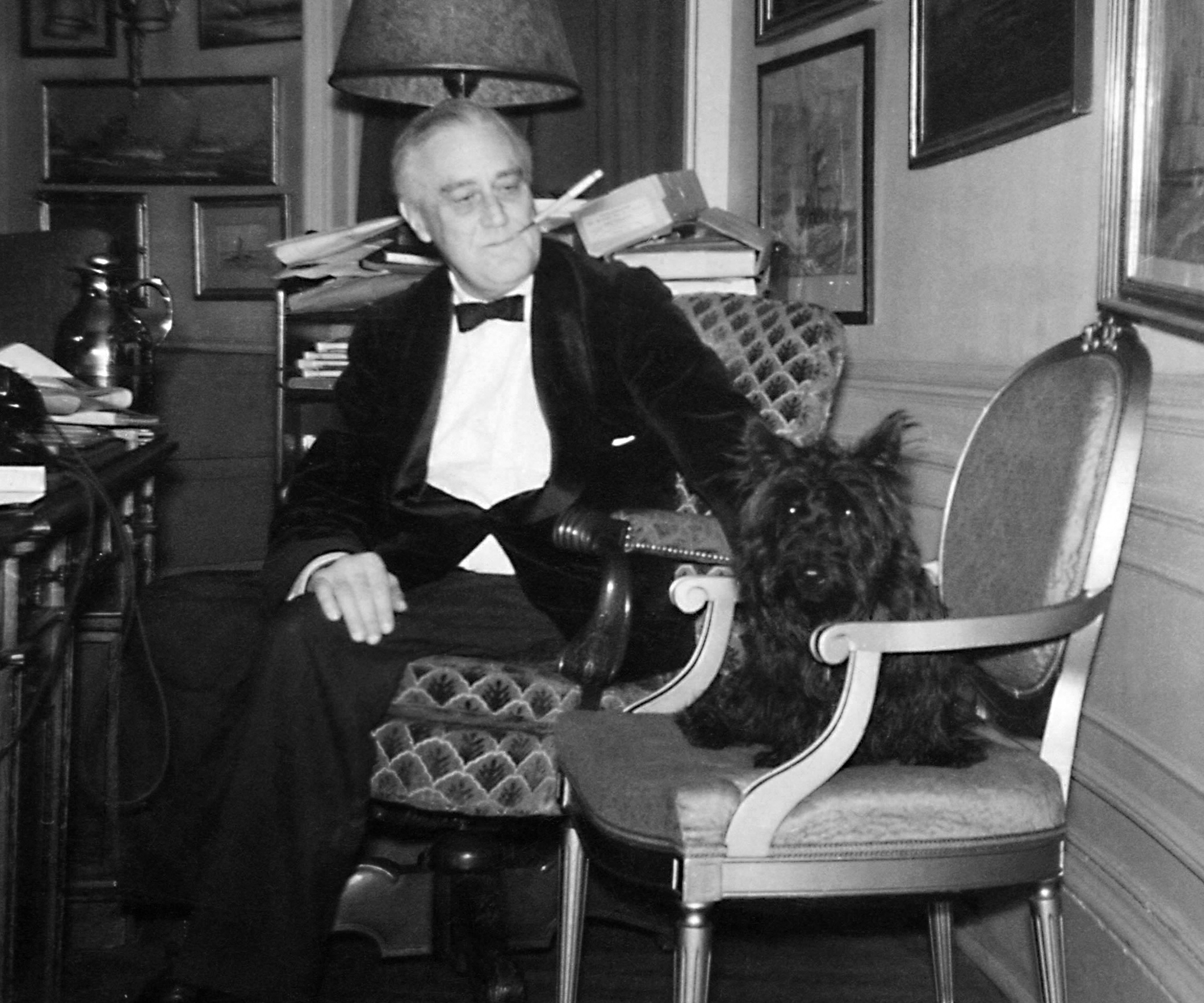
Roosevelt and Fala in the White House study (December 20, 1941)

Fala was born on April 7, 1940. Roosevelt's distant cousin, Margaret "Daisy" Suckley, gave the dog to Roosevelt as an early Christmas gift. As a puppy, Fala was given obedience training by Suckley, who taught him to sit, roll over, and jump. His original name was Big Boy; Roosevelt renamed him Murray the Outlaw of Falahill after John Murray of Falahill, a famous Scottish ancestor. This was later shortened to "Fala".

After a few weeks at the White House, Fala was taken to the hospital for intestinal problems. Roosevelt discovered that Fala had found his way to the kitchen and was being overfed. Roosevelt issued an order to the staff that Fala would henceforth be fed only by the president himself.

== White House years ==
Fala was relocated into the White House on November 10, 1940, and spent most of his time there until Roosevelt's death during April 1945. Fala also traveled with Roosevelt to his home (Springwood) in Hyde Park, New York, and to Warm Springs, Georgia, where Roosevelt received treatment for his paralytic illness.

An MGM movie about a typical day in the White House featured Fala. He also became an honorary private of the U.S. Army by "contributing" $1 to the war effort for every day of the year and setting an example for others on the "home front". During the Battle of the Bulge, American soldiers asked one another the name of the President's dog, expecting the answer "Fala," as a supplementary safeguard against German soldiers attempting to infiltrate American ranks.

Fala often accompanied Roosevelt to important events; he traveled in Sacred Cow, the president's airplane, and in Ferdinand Magellan, Roosevelt's custom-made train car, as well as by ship. He was with Roosevelt at the Atlantic Charter Conference, Quebec, the meeting with President Manuel Ávila Camacho of Mexico in Monterrey, and appears quickly on deck during press filming of FDR’s visit to Hawaii in 1944 to confer with General Douglas MacArthur and Admiral Chester Nimitz.

During 1943, Fala was the subject of a short series of political cartoons by Alan Foster titled Mr. Fala of the White House. In the 1943 romantic comedy Princess O'Rourke, Fala was played by Whiskers.

== Fala speech ==
On September 23, 1944, Roosevelt began his 1944 presidential campaign in Washington, D.C., speaking at a dinner with the International Teamsters Union. The half-hour speech was also broadcast by all U.S. radio networks. In the speech, Roosevelt criticized Republican opponents in Congress and detailed their criticisms of him. Late in the speech, Roosevelt addressed Republican charges that he had accidentally left Fala behind on the Aleutian Islands while on tour there and had sent a U.S. Navy destroyer to retrieve him at an exorbitant cost to the taxpayers:

These Republican leaders have not been content with attacks on me, or my wife, or on my sons. No, not content with that, they now include my little dog, Fala. Well, of course, I don't resent attacks, and my family don't resent attacks, but Fala does resent them. You know, Fala is Scotch, and being a Scottie, as soon as he learned that the Republican fiction writers in Congress and out had concocted a story that I'd left him behind on an Aleutian island and had sent a destroyer back to find him – at a cost to the taxpayers of two or three, or eight or twenty million dollars – his Scotch soul was furious. He has not been the same dog since. I am accustomed to hearing malicious falsehoods about myself ... But I think I have a right to resent, to object, to libelous statements about my dog.

The story of being left behind on the Aleutian Islands was false. (Fala did cause some minor trouble once on the cruiser USS Tuscaloosa in the West Indies by licking the feet of sailors relaxing on deck.)

The idea of turning the Republican charges into a joke was that of Orson Welles. Campaigning extensively for Roosevelt, Welles occasionally sent him ideas and phrases that were sometimes incorporated into what Welles characterized as "less important speeches". One of these was the "Fala speech". Welles ad-libbed the Fala joke for the president, who was so delighted that he had a final version written into the speech by his staff. After the broadcast Roosevelt asked Welles, "How did I do? Was my timing right?"

"The audience went wild, laughing and cheering and calling for more," wrote historian Doris Kearns Goodwin. "And the laughter carried beyond the banquet hall; it reverberated in living rooms and kitchens throughout the country, where people were listening to the speech on their radios. The Fala bit was so funny, one reporter observed, that 'even the stoniest of Republican faces cracked a smile.'"

== After Roosevelt's death ==
President Roosevelt died at Warm Springs, Georgia, on April 12, 1945. In the minutes after his death, Fala behaved very strangely. FDR biographer Jim Bishop wrote about the death scene: "... a snapping, snarling series of barks was heard. No one had paid any attention to Fala. He had been dozing in a corner of the room. For a reason beyond understanding, he ran directly for the front screen door and knocked his head against it. The screen broke and he crawled through and ran snapping and barking up into the hills. There, Secret Service men could see him, standing alone, unmoving, on an eminence. This led to the quiet question: 'Do dogs really know?'"

Fala attended Roosevelt's funeral and went to live with the widowed Eleanor Roosevelt at Val-Kill. She took great pleasure in Fala's company, and the two became inseparable companions. She often mentioned Fala in her newspaper column, "My Day", and wrote of him in her autobiography:

It was Fala, my husband's little dog, who never really readjusted. Once, in 1945, when General Eisenhower came to lay a wreath on Franklin's grave, the gates of the regular driveway were opened and his automobile approached the house accompanied by the wailing of the sirens of a police escort. When Fala heard the sirens, his legs straightened out, his ears pricked up and I knew that he expected to see his master coming down the drive as he had come so many times. Later, when we were living in the cottage, Fala always lay near the dining-room door where he could watch both entrances just as he did when his master was there. Franklin would often decide suddenly to go somewhere and Fala had to watch both entrances in order to be ready to spring up and join the party on short notice. Fala accepted me after my husband's death, but I was just someone to put up with until the master should return.

In November 1945, Fala was hospitalized for a week after being attacked at the family's Hyde Park estate by Elliott Roosevelt's 135-pound (61 kg) Bullmastiff, Blaze. Fala had been staying with Margaret Suckley and visited Hyde Park. He was on a leash when the larger dog jumped on him, slashing his back and right eye. The attack ended when someone struck Blaze with a rock and dazed him. Blaze was euthanized as a precaution against future attacks and tested negative for rabies.

Suffering from deafness and failing health, Fala was euthanized on April 5, 1952, two days before his twelfth birthday. Fala is buried in a marked grave about ten yards (9.1 m) behind the Roosevelt tombstone in the Rose Garden at Springwood, beside Chief (1918–1933), the Roosevelts' German Shepherd.

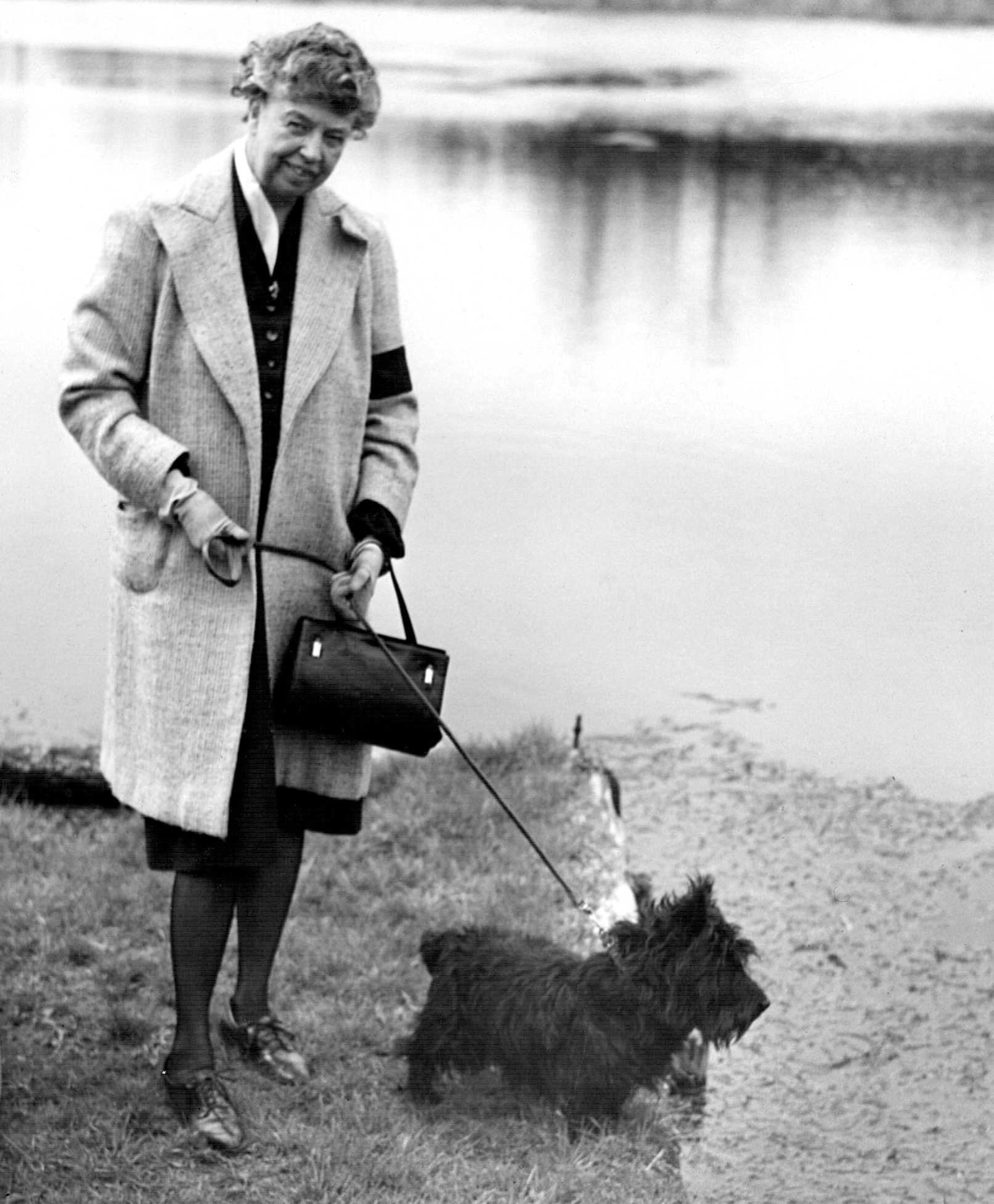
Eleanor Roosevelt walking Fala (1947)

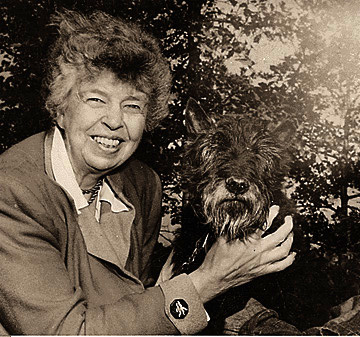
Fala and Eleanor Roosevelt (1951)

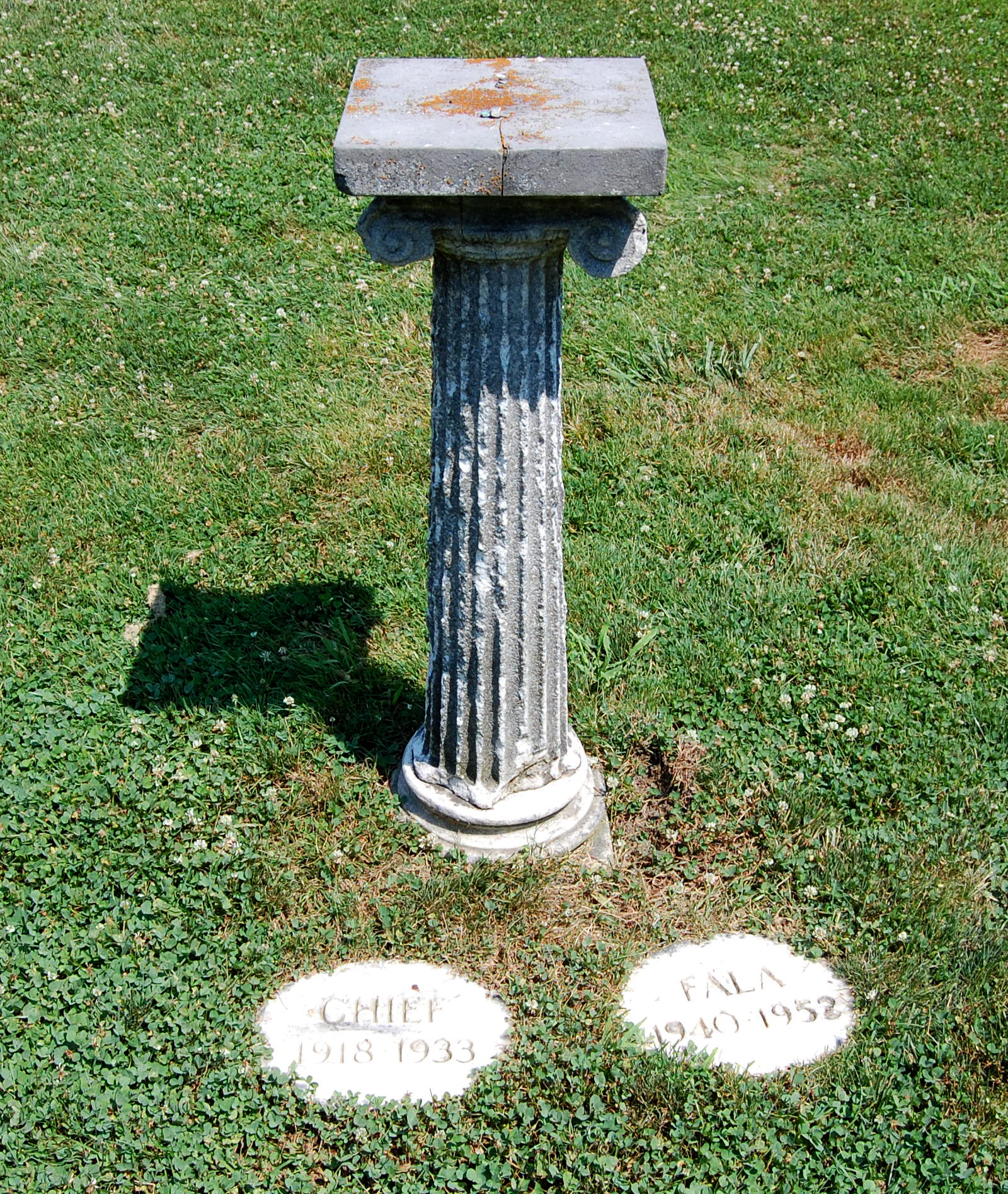
Chief and Fala's graves

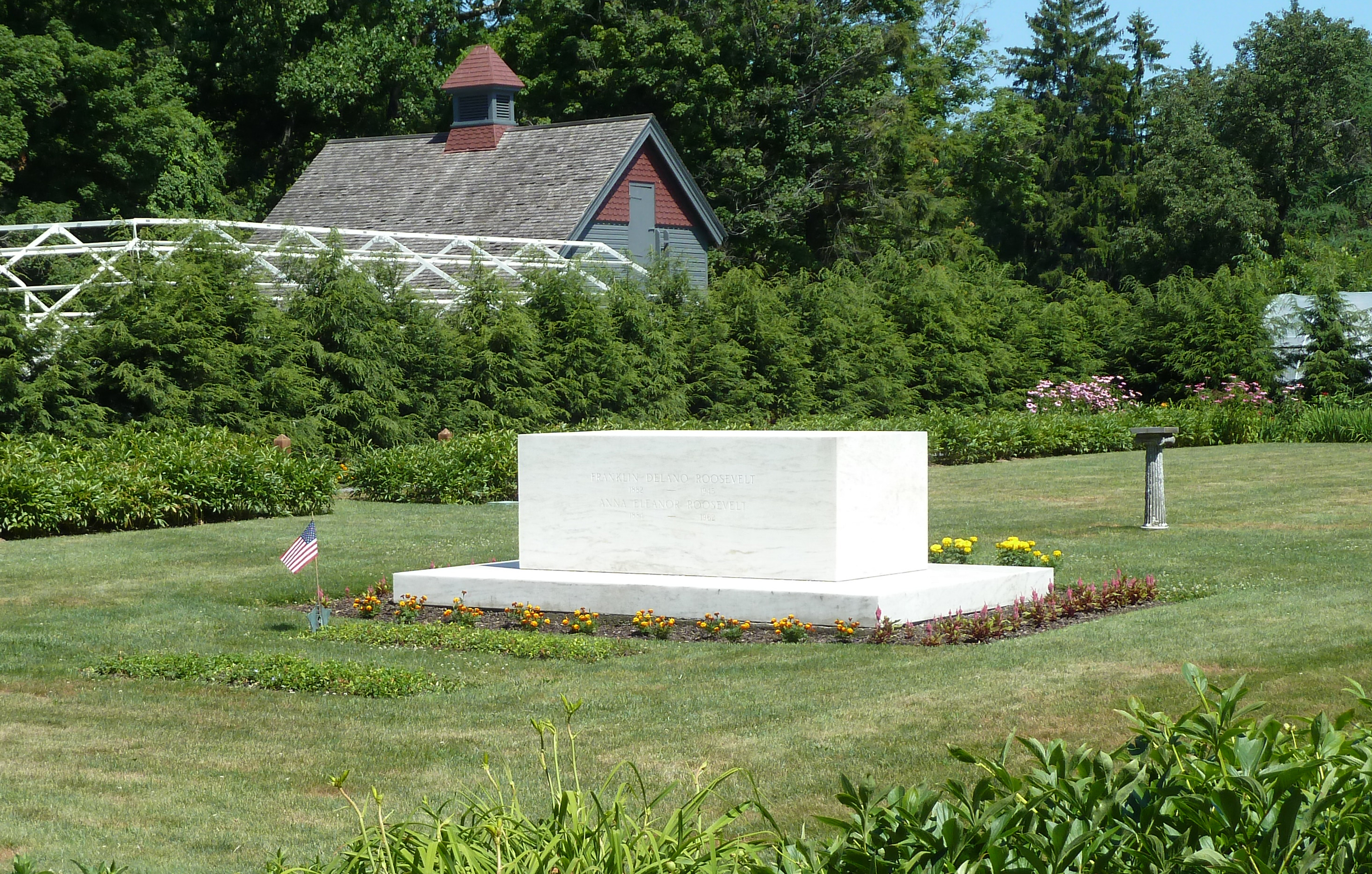
Grave near that of the Roosevelts at Springwood

== Memorials ==
A statue of Fala beside Roosevelt is featured in the Franklin Delano Roosevelt Memorial in Washington, D.C. Fala is the only presidential pet so honored. Another statue of him has been placed at Puerto Rico's "Paseo de los Presidentes" in San Juan. A third statue is in the Franklin Delano Roosevelt Presidential Library and Museum in Hyde Park, NY. Fala's collar, dog dish, White House dog tags and other artifacts also are on display.

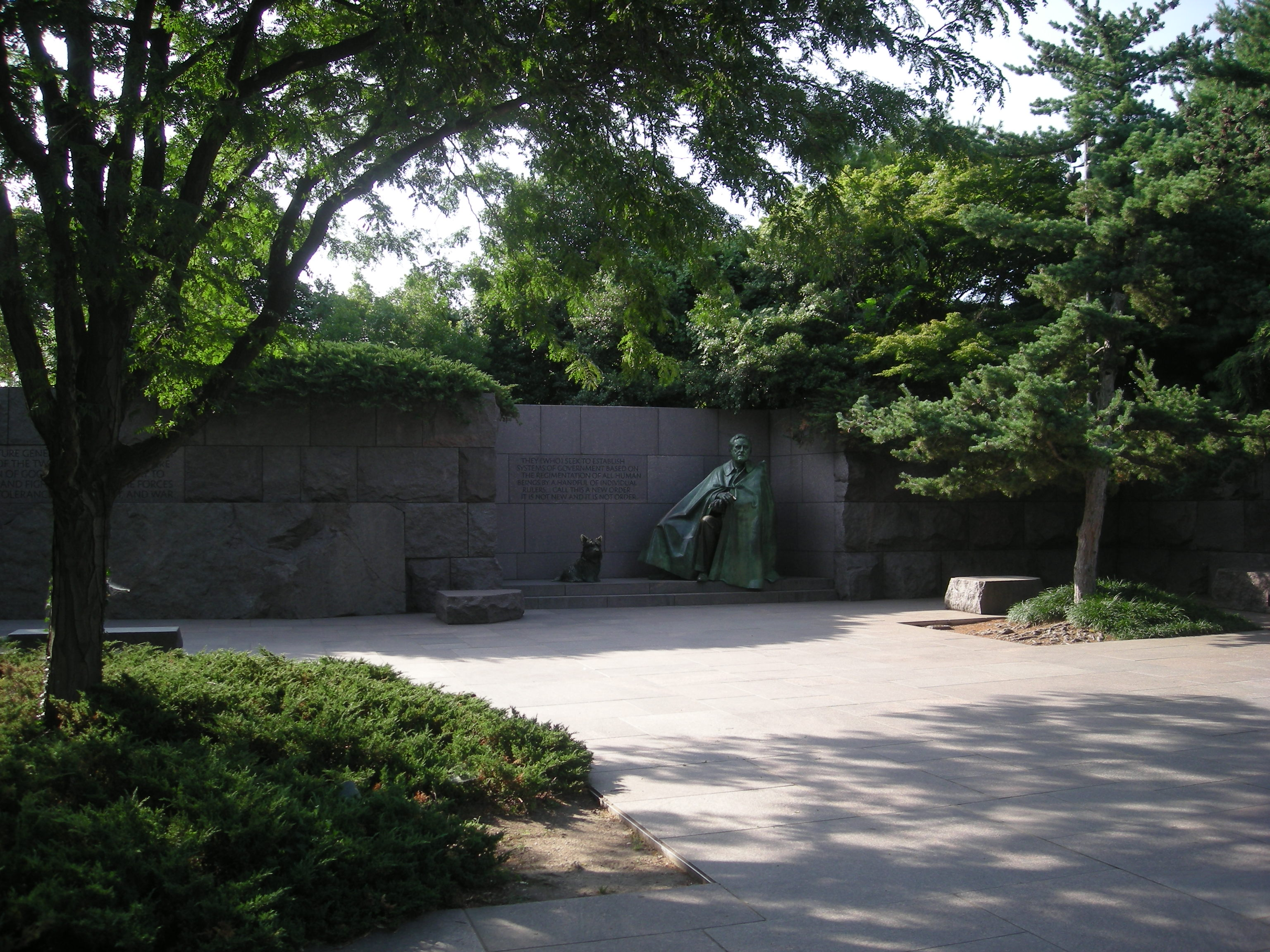
The Franklin D. Roosevelt Memorial, showing a statue of Fala next to FDR

Statue of Fala next to FDR Upclose

== See also ==
- List of individual dogs
- United States presidential pets
- Checkers speech
