= Home of Franklin D. Roosevelt National Historic Site =

Estate in Hyde Park, New York

- Home of Franklin D. Roosevelt; National Historic Site
- U.S. National Register of Historic Places
- U.S. National Historic Site
- New York State Register of Historic Places
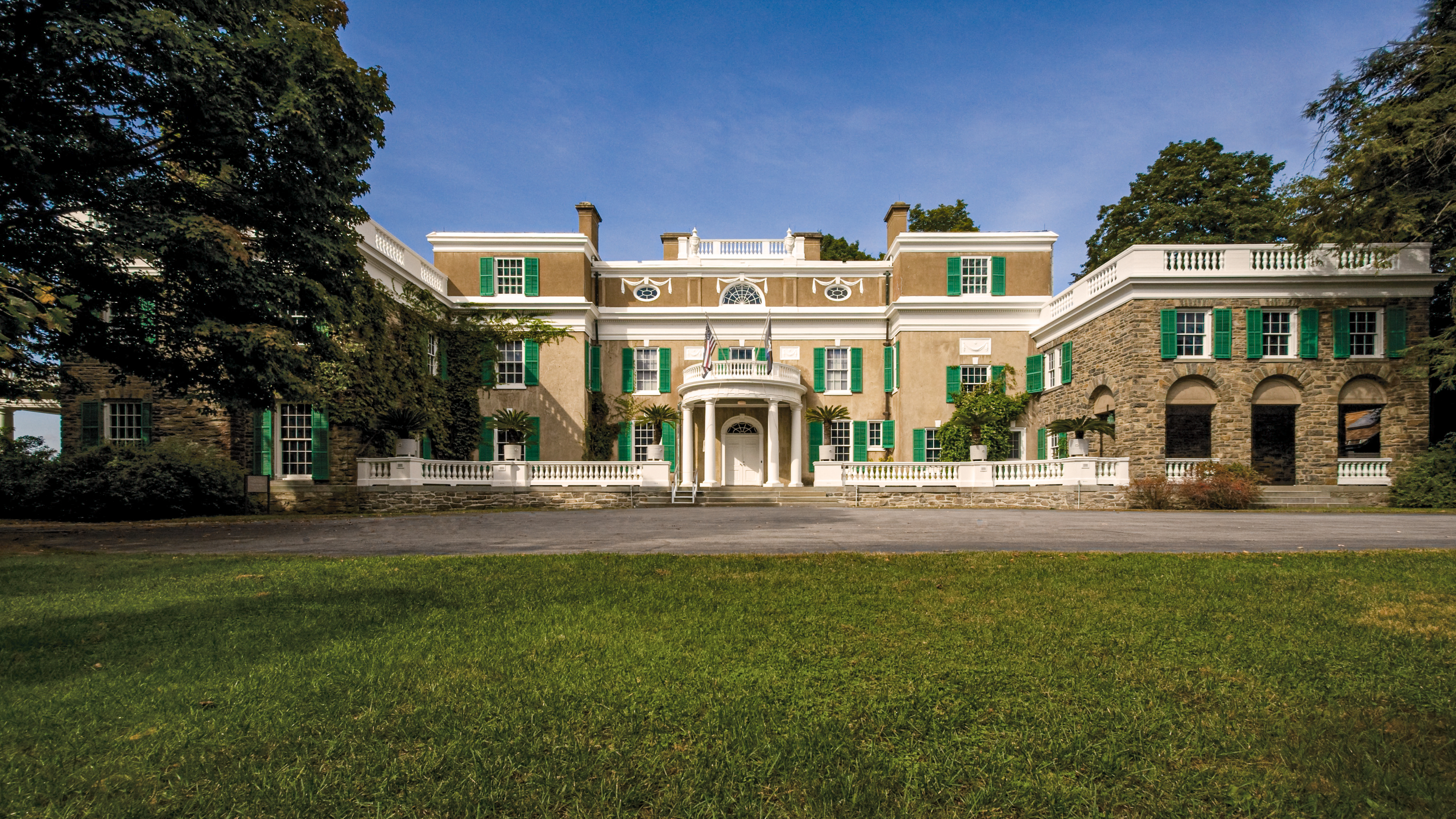
- Springwood Estate at Franklin D. Roosevelt National Historic Site.
- Interactive map showing Springwood’s location
- Location: Hyde Park, New York
- Nearest city: Poughkeepsie
- Coordinates: 41°46′2″N 73°56′8″W
- Area: 800 acres (320 ha)
- Built: 1800–1845
- Architectural style: Federal, Italianate
- Visitation: 101,927 (2025)
- Website: Home of Franklin D. Roosevelt National Historic Site
- NRHP reference No.: 66000056
- NYSRHP No.: 02707.000485

Significant dates
- Added to NRHP: October 15, 1966
- Designated NHS: January 15, 1944
- Designated NYSRHP: June 23, 1980

The Home of Franklin D. Roosevelt National Historic Site preserves the Springwood estate in Hyde Park, New York, United States. Springwood was the birthplace, lifelong home, and burial place of the 32nd president of the United States, Franklin D. Roosevelt. Eleanor Roosevelt is buried alongside him. The National Historic Site was established in 1945.

== History ==
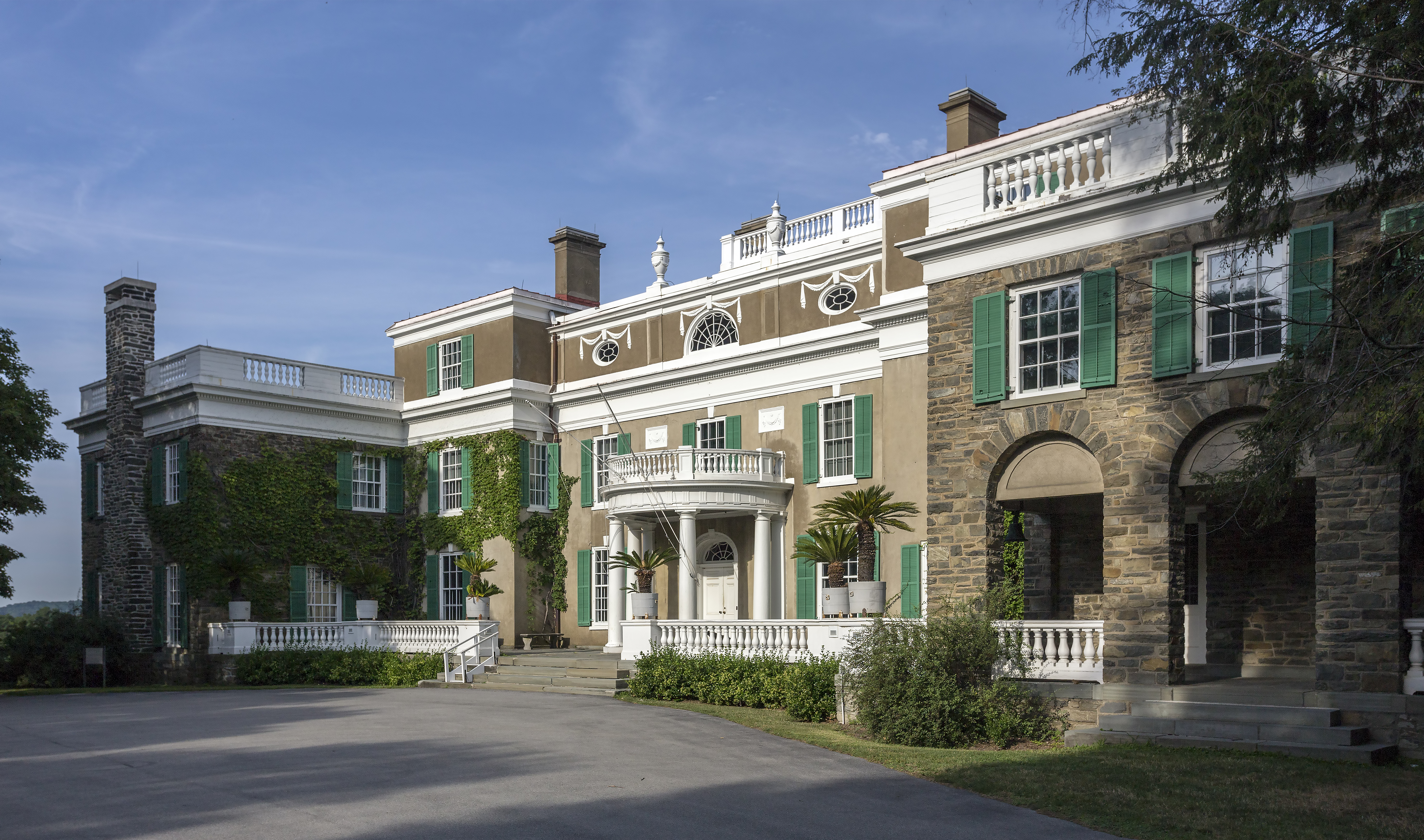
Springwood, the home where Franklin Delano Roosevelt lived with family, is now a National Historic Site.

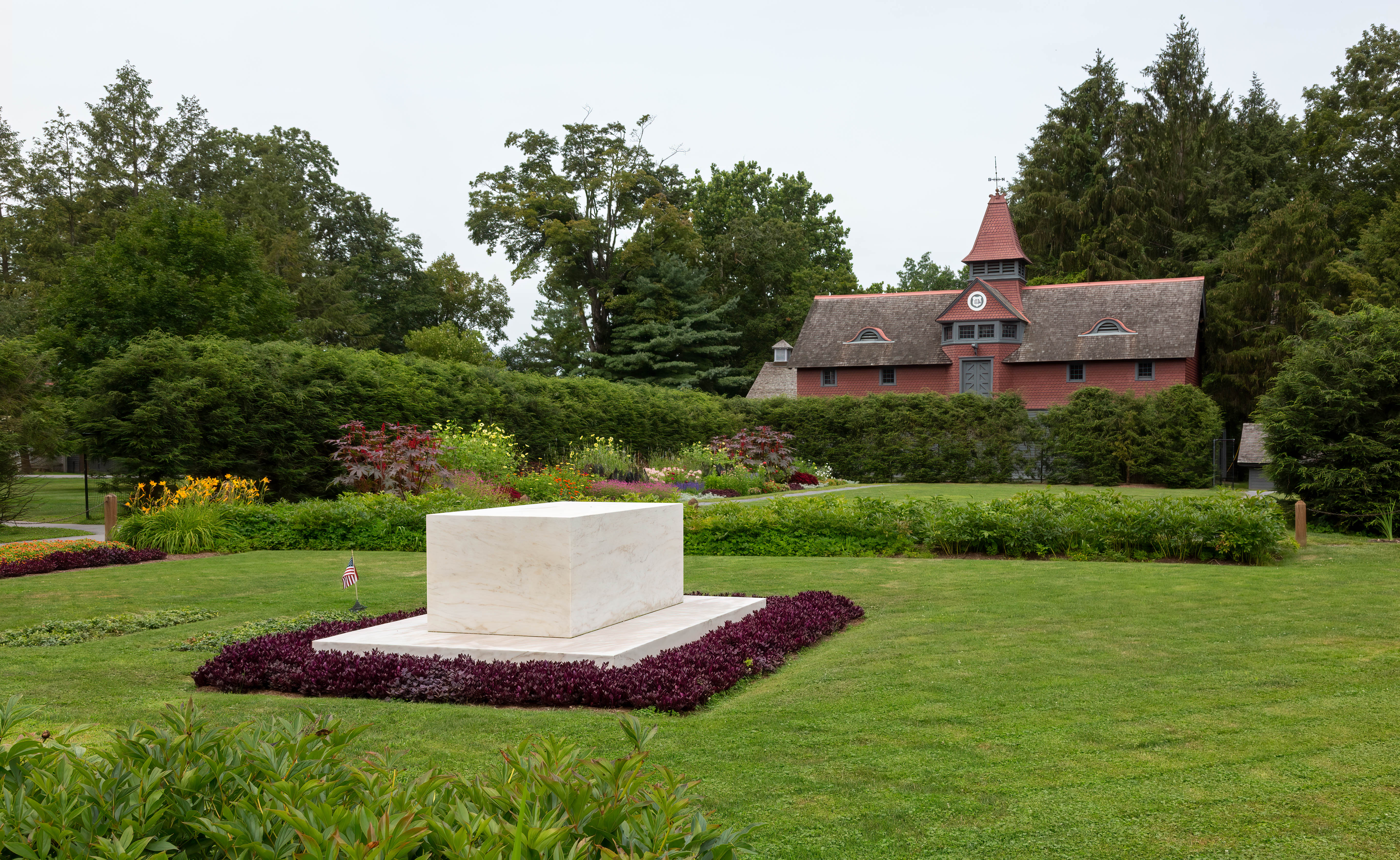
The grave of Franklin and Eleanor Roosevelt

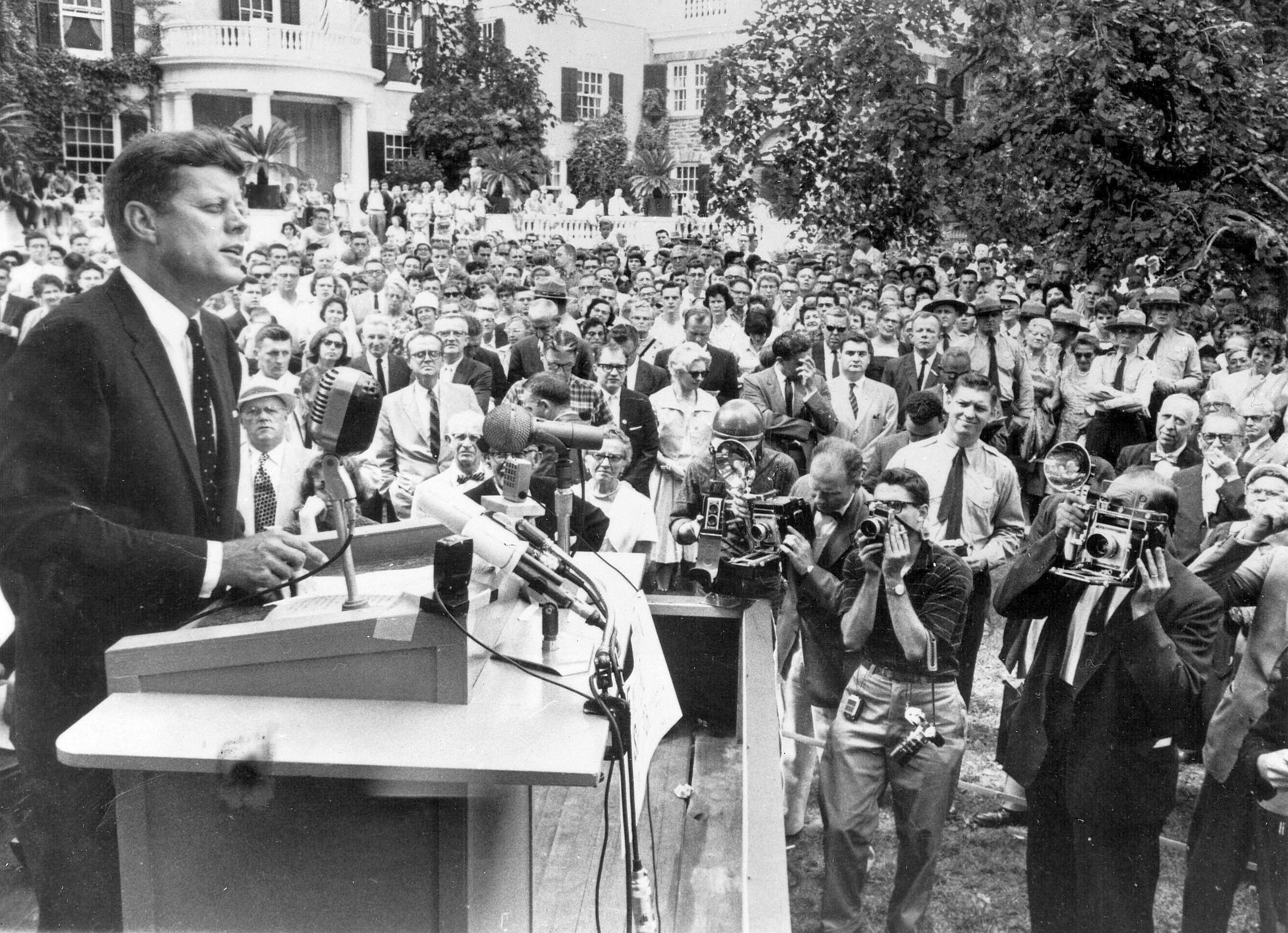
John F. Kennedy at Springwood during his 1960 presidential campaign

=== Early history ===
In 1697, the English Crown awarded a 220 sq mi (570 km^{2}) land grant (the "Great Nine Partners Patent") to a group of nine businessmen from New York City who had purchased the land from the native Wappinger people. The parcel extended from the Hudson River on the west to the border with Connecticut on the east. To ensure equal access to the river for all partners, the land along its shore was divided into nine "Water Lots"; Springwood is located on the one granted to William Creed.

While the early history of the house on the Springwood estate remains unclear, it is believed that the central portion of the present-day home is formed by a large Federal style farmhouse constructed around the year 1800. In 1845 the estate was purchased by Josiah Wheeler, a merchant from New York City. He remodeled the structure in the then-fashionable Italianate style, expanding it to 15 rooms with a three-story tower at the south end and front and rear piazzas spanning the length of the home.

=== Roosevelt ownership ===
In 1866, the estate, which had been reduced to approximately one square mile (2.5 square kilometers), was bought by James Roosevelt, Sr., Franklin D. Roosevelt's father, for US$40,000, at a time when a textile worker's earnings were less than a dollar a day. The property featured a stable and horse track, which was important to James, an avid horse breeder. Through his death, 34 years later in 1900, James made many improvements to the home and property. He enlarged the servants' wing, adding two rooms, and had a spacious carriage house built in the vicinity.

In 1882, Franklin was born in what was then the second floor tower bedroom at the south end of the home. At the time, it functioned as the master bedroom; the bedroom which he, and later his sons, used during boyhood is nearby on the same floor. In 1905, after he and Eleanor Roosevelt married, the young couple moved in with his mother, Sara. The estate remained the center of Roosevelt's life in all stages of his career.

In 1915, Franklin, together with his mother, undertook a final major enlargement and remodeling of the home. This both accommodated his growing family and created an environment suitable for entertaining political associates which reflected his ambitions. Roosevelt contributed many ideas for the new design, tempered by his mother's means. She commissioned the design work from the firm of Hoppin & Koen, of New York City. The home was more than doubled in size by adding two large fieldstone wings (designed by Roosevelt), a tower, and a third story with a flat roof. The clapboard exterior was replaced with stucco and most of the porch was replaced with a balustraded fieldstone terrace and a small columned portico around the entrance. These alterations gave the exterior of the house the look of a Colonial Revival mansion. The interior, while retaining much of the original layout, was redesigned primarily with the aim of housing Roosevelt's growing collections of books, paintings, stamps, and coins. The remodeling work was finished within one year in 1916. Roosevelt also changed the appearance of the surrounding land by extensive tree plantings. Between 1911, when the large scale planting started, and Roosevelt's death in 1945, more than 400,000 trees were planted on the estate. Eventually, large portions of the estate were turned into an experimental forestry station under an agreement with the Forestry Department of Syracuse University.

During his presidency from March 4, 1933, until his death on April 12, 1945, Franklin made almost 200 visits to Springwood, although he eventually built wheelchair-friendly Top Cottage nearby as a home of his own. The main estate functioned as a "Summer White House" where the President hosted his political associates and other prominent national and international figures. In June 1939, when King George VI and Queen Elizabeth, accompanied by Prime Minister of Canada William Lyon Mackenzie King as minister in attendance, made the first visit of a reigning British monarch to the United States, they were hosted at Springwood. Other guests included British prime minister Winston Churchill, as well as European royalty such as Queen Wilhelmina, Princess Juliana, and Princess Beatrix of the Netherlands, and Crown Prince Olaf and Crown Princess Märtha of Norway. Further, Roosevelt used the estate as a retreat for himself and his political associates on the eves of three of the four elections in which he ran for president. When the incoming results indicated that he had won the election, he would go onto the front terrace to deliver his victory speech. In all four presidential elections, however, Dutchess County voted for Roosevelt's opponent.

Roosevelt made his last visit to Springwood in the final week of March 1945, about two weeks before his death. At his own wish he was buried near the sundial in the Rose Garden on April 15, 1945. His wife was buried at his side after her death in 1962. Also interred there are Fala, their famous Scottish Terrier, and Chief, a German Shepherd also owned by FDR.

=== Donation to the United States ===
In 1941, Roosevelt dedicated his papers and a new building to house them on the estate to the public, as the Franklin D. Roosevelt Presidential Library and Museum. In 1943—two years before he died in office—Roosevelt donated the entirety of the estate (except for Val-Kill, which had been given to Eleanor) to the American people under the condition that his family maintained a lifetime right to usage of the property. On November 21, 1945, after the family had relinquished its rights, the estate was transferred to the U.S. Department of the Interior. Since then, the estate has been administered by the National Park Service as a National Historic Site and is open to the public. In 2005, the site covered a total area of more than a square mile and received 108,611 visitors.

== Rooms ==
=== Entrance Hall ===
The walls of the entrance hall are mostly covered with paintings from Roosevelt's collection. On display are mainly naval paintings as well as some historical cartoons. Specimens from his boyhood collection of birds are also on display, as well as a sculpture of him when he was 29. In the corner behind the main staircase is a manually operated trunk elevator, which the wheelchair-using president used to move between floors.

=== Living room and library ===
The living room and library was the place where Roosevelt worked on his private collections; he accumulated a personal library of approximately 14,000 volumes, over 2,000 naval paintings, prints, and lithographs, over 300 bird specimens, over 200 ship models, 1.2 million stamps, as well as thousands of coins, banknotes, campaign buttons, and medallions.

=== Music room ===
The music room (also known as the "Dresden Room" for the origin of some of the porcelain) is a formal parlor which contains many Chinese pieces of porcelain and lacquer-ware. These were acquired when the family of Roosevelt's mother stayed in China, where her father made a fortune in the China trade. Together with the adjacent dining room, this part of the house was the setting for the formal entertaining of guests. A collection of autographed photographs of some of the Roosevelts' more famous guests is kept in the room on the piano.

=== Bedrooms of Eleanor and Franklin Roosevelt ===
During the enlargement of the house in 1915 a suite of rooms was created for Eleanor and Franklin Roosevelt in one of the new wings. Originally these rooms included a sitting room and two dressing rooms, but after Roosevelt was diagnosed with poliomyelitis in 1921, one of the dressing rooms was converted into a separate bedroom for his wife Eleanor and the sitting room into a bedroom for his mother Sara.

=== The "Snuggery" ===
The Snuggery was used by Roosevelt's mother, Sara, for beginning her day and conducting her business of running the household. The room was created in its present form during the extensive remodeling of 1915 by a division of the old South Parlor into a gallery and the Snuggery. Because most of the furniture of the old parlor was retained despite the reduction in size, the Snuggery has a cluttered appearance.

== Gallery ==
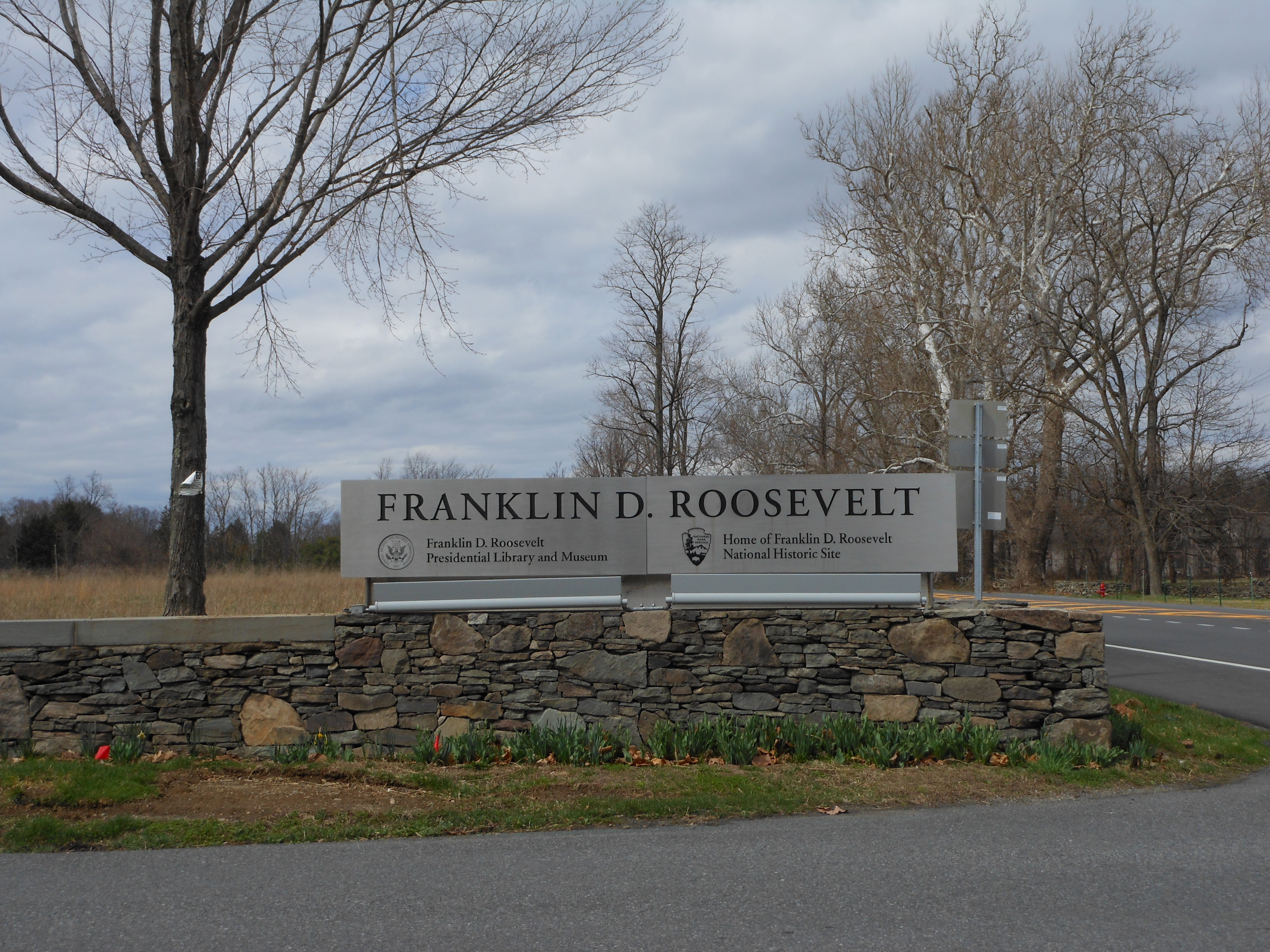
Entrance to the FDR National Historic Site

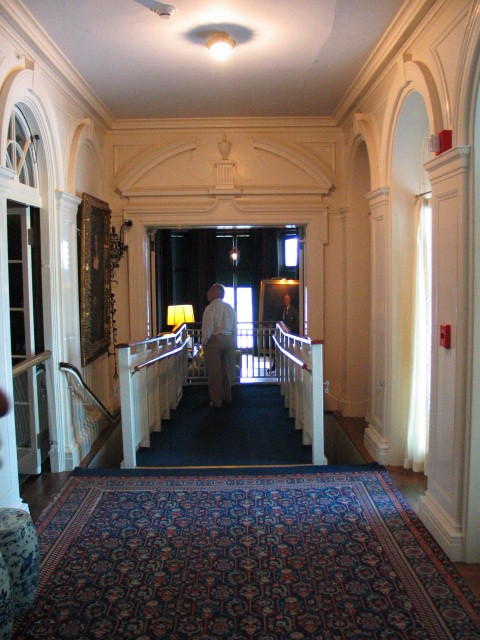
South hallway on the main floor, leading into the living-room, with a view of the Snuggery door to the left

Statue of Roosevelt as a young man

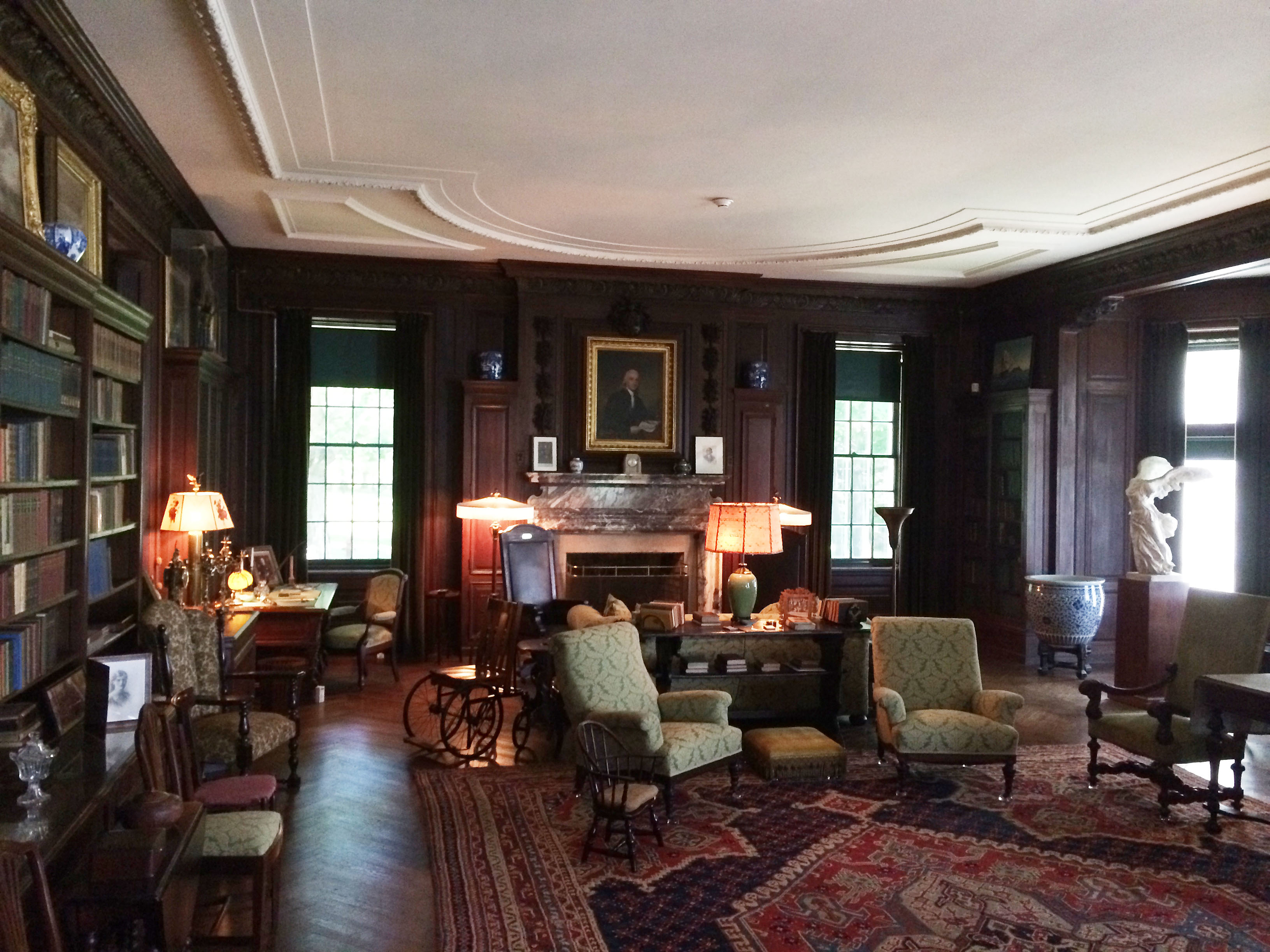
Library and living room

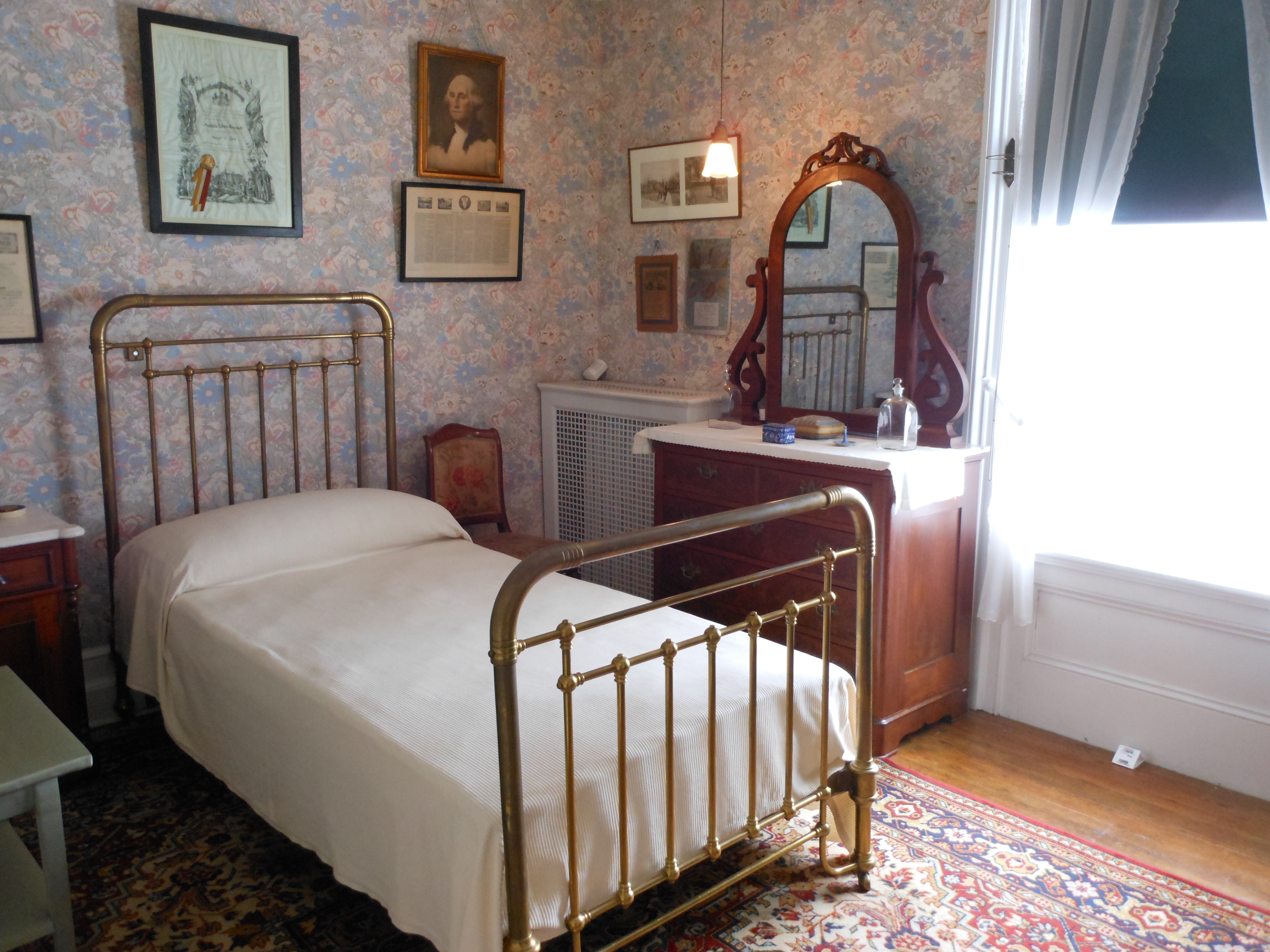
FDR's childhood bedroom

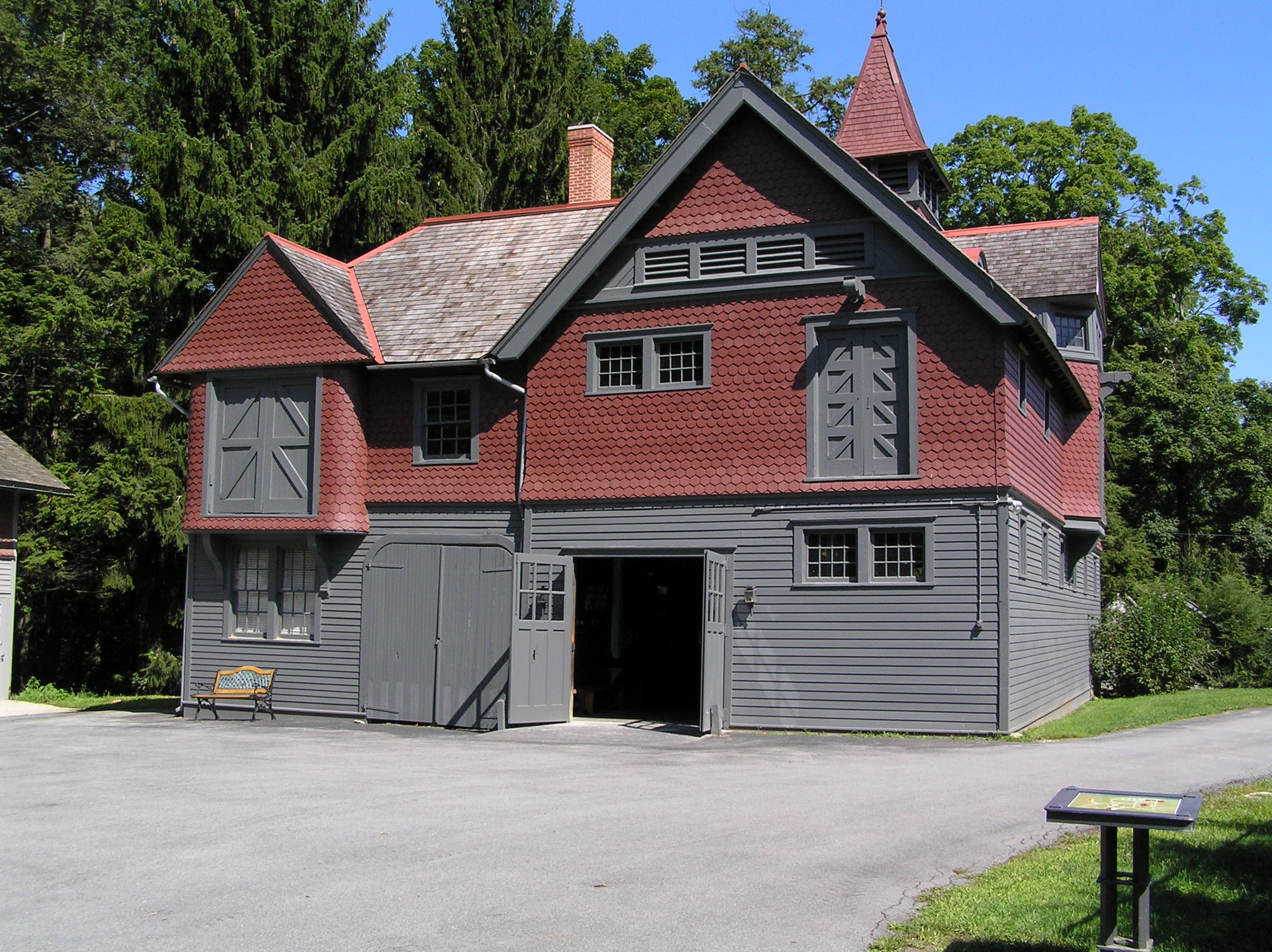
Horse stable

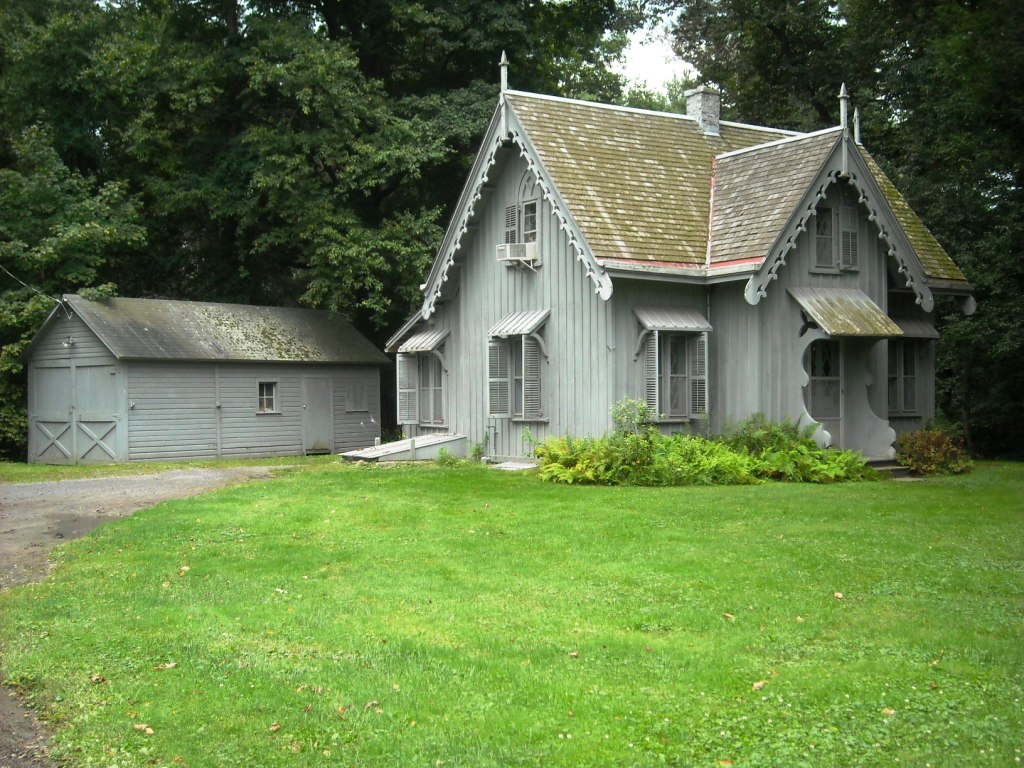
Outbuildings

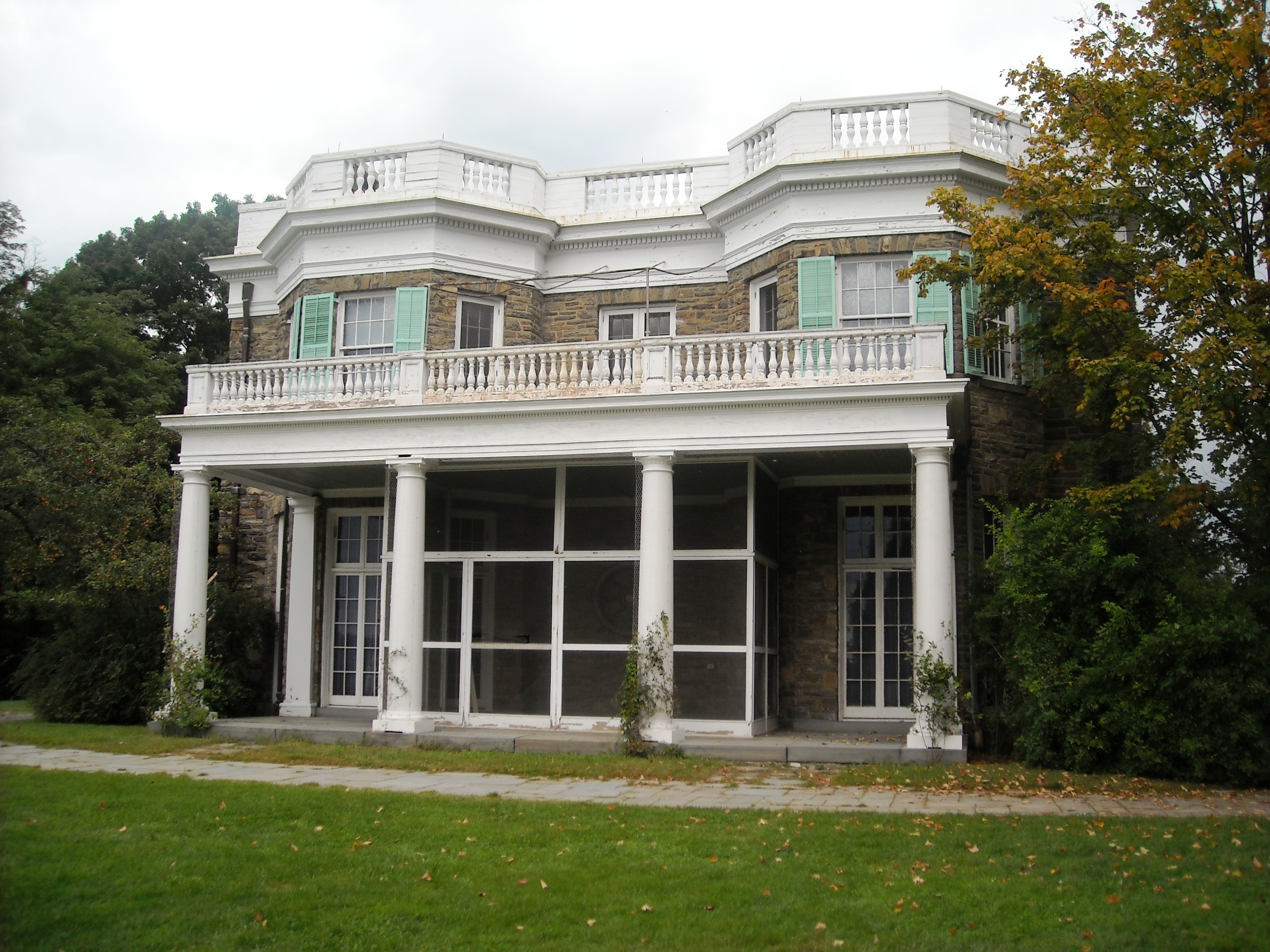
Side of Springwood

== See also ==
- Franklin D. Roosevelt Presidential Library and Museum
- Eleanor Roosevelt National Historic Site
- Maritje Kill
- List of residences of presidents of the United States
- List of burial places of presidents and vice presidents of the United States
- Presidential memorials in the United States
