= Sixteen Mile District =

Historic district in New York, United States

- U.S. National Register of Historic Places
- U.S. Historic district
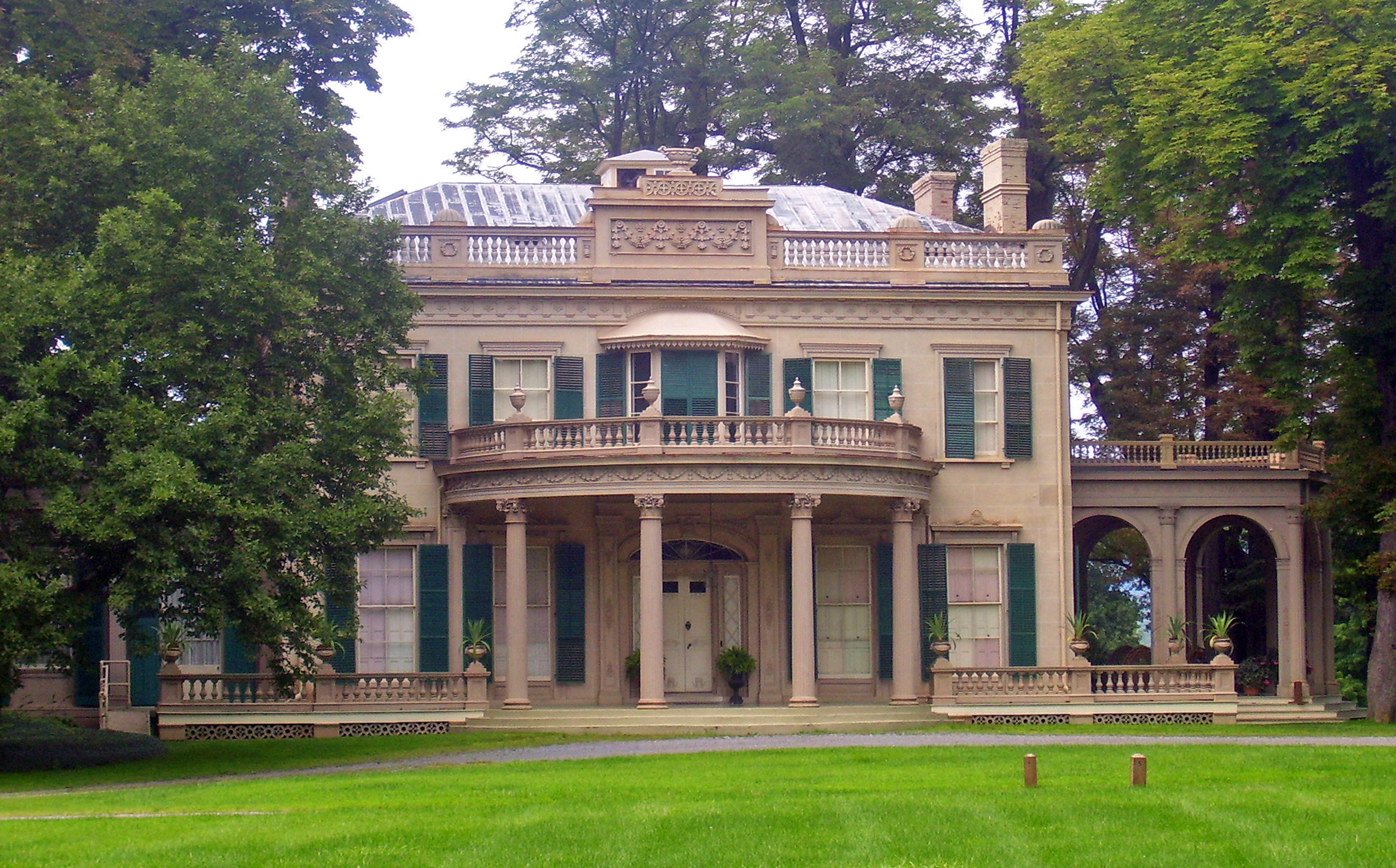
- Montgomery Place

- Location within New York Location within the United States
- Nearest city: W of Clermont along Hudson River, Clermont, New York and Rhinebeck, New York
- Coordinates: 41°57′12″N 73°55′29″W
- Area: 12,100 acres (49 km^{2})
- Built: 1750
- Architect: Multiple
- Architectural style: Late 19th And 20th Century Revivals, Greek Revival, Late Victorian
- MPS: Rhinebeck Town MRA (AD)
- NRHP reference No.: 79001571
- Added to NRHP: March 7, 1979

Sixteen Mile District was a national historic district located near Clermont and Rhinebeck in Columbia County, New York. The district includes 233 contributing buildings that are associated with estates located along the east side of the Hudson River. A number of the buildings are located on the campus of Bard College, notably those associated with the estates of Blythewood and Ward Manor. Other notable intact estates within the district are Montgomery Place, Teviot, the Pynes, Callendar House, Edgewater, Rokeby, Mandara (Steen / Valetje), Wilderstein, and Wildercliff. The Ferncliff estate includes a "casino" or tennis court building designed by Stanford White.

It was listed on the National Register of Historic Places in 1979. In 1990, it was subsumed, along with the Clermont Estates Historic District, into the Hudson River Historic District.
