= Hudson River Historic District =

Historic district in New York, United States

- U.S. National Register of Historic Places
- U.S. National Historic Landmark District
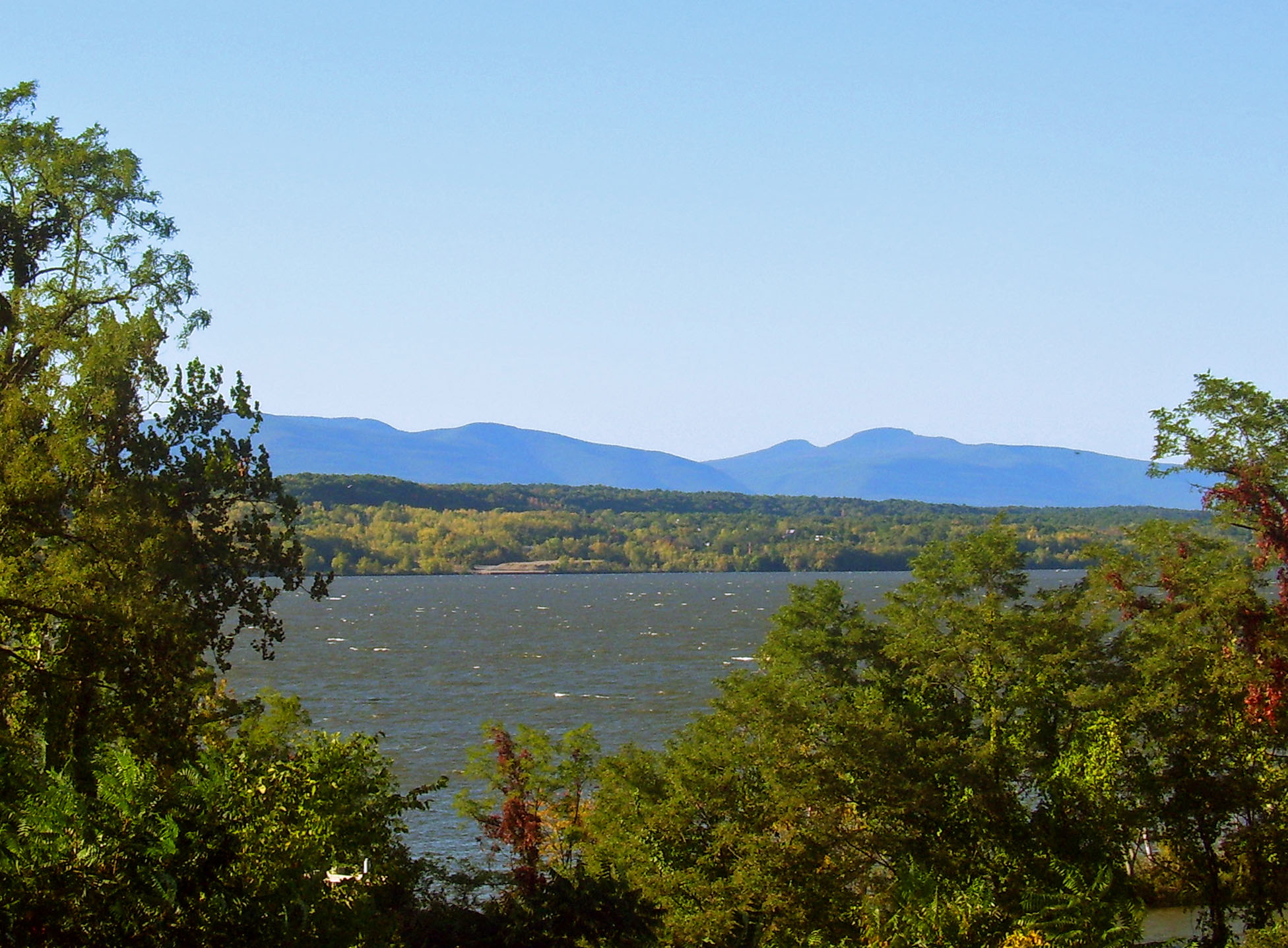
- A 2007 view of the Catskills across the Hudson, one of the district's defining features
- Location: Staatsburg, Rhinecliff, Tivoli, Annandale, Barrytown
- Coordinates: 41°55′13″N 73°56′12″W
- Area: 34.6 square miles (90 km^{2})
- Architect: Multiple
- Architectural style: Colonial, Mid 19th century Revival, Late Victorian
- NRHP reference No.: 90002219

Significant dates
- Added to NRHP: December 14, 1990
- Designated NHLD: December 14, 1990

The Hudson River Historic District, also known as Hudson River Heritage Historic District, is the largest Federally designated district on the mainland of the contiguous United States. It covers an area of 22,205 acres (34.6 square miles, 89 km^{2}) extending inland roughly a mile (1.6 km) from the east bank of the Hudson River between Staatsburg and Germantown in Dutchess and Columbia counties in the U.S. state of New York. This area includes the riverfront sections of the towns of Clermont, Red Hook, Rhinebeck and part of Hyde Park. This strip includes in their entirety the hamlets of Annandale, Barrytown, Rhinecliff and the village of Tivoli. Bard College and two protected areas, Margaret Lewis Norrie State Park and Tivoli Bays Unique Area, are also within the district.

From the colonial era to the early 20th century, the district was characterized by large "country seats" built by members of the Livingston family, such as Clermont Manor and Montgomery Place, both National Historic Landmarks. For most of that period, these estates were worked by tenant farmers, with much of the rest of the population concentrated in small riverside communities. This semi-feudal arrangement is still reflected in land use and architecture within the district today, since it has not seen major development.

In 1990, two separate historic districts were combined and expanded into a National Historic Landmark District (NHLD), in recognition of this unique history and character. Only 2% by acreage of the properties within the district are not considered historic.

== Geography ==
The Hudson River Historic District roughly corresponds to the 40 estates established along the river on lands originally granted to the Livingston family. Portions, the Sixteen Mile District and Clermont Estates Historic District, were previously included in two other smaller districts that were later incorporated into the district.

Two of its boundaries are political. On the west it ends at the Ulster county line in the middle of the river channel. The Kingston-Rhinecliff Bridge provides the only access from this direction. In the north it is the line between the towns of Clermont and Germantown. The south boundary is not a municipal line but rather coterminous with the south boundary of Margaret Lewis Norrie State Park north of Staatsburg.

Only to the east does the delineation get complicated. It follows an irregular line parallel to US 9 north to Weys Corners, the junction with NY 9G north of Rhinebeck, and then 9G from there to the north boundary. It has been drawn very tightly to exclude some newer properties that do not reflect the traditional character of the area yet include some lands still reflecting their development as estates that had not previously been recognized. There are no signs or other indicators of the district boundary along the local and county roads that serve it.

The land within the district is generally a gentle and gradual slope from the low glacial ridge followed by routes 9 and 9G to the river, which generally remains about 10 feet (3 m) above sea level at this point. The railroad tracks built for the Hudson River Railroad to connect New York City and Albany, still used by Amtrak and CSX today, run at the river's edge through much of the district.

Most of the land reflects its past as large country estates, with large fields and meadows alternating with woodlots. The slope allows for expansive views from cleared areas of not only the river and the higher glacial ridges on the west side but the Catskill Mountains in the distance. This prospect has attracted homebuilders from the earliest times of settlement to the present, and is considered an essential quality of the district: "There is a sense of openness that belies [the district']s constrained width because it is counterpointed by the persistent vision of the mountains in the west," writes architectural historian Neil Larson in the NHL application. "The district benefits from such a direct and imposing profile of the mountains, and its legendary country estates would lose much of their appeal without this extraordinary setting."

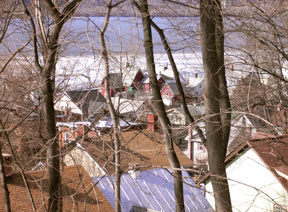
Rhinecliff, the oldest riverside community

The district's permanent human population and attendant development is densely concentrated in the small riverside communities — from south to north, Rhinecliff, Barrytown, Annandale and Tivoli. This, too, reflects the years of estate and country house development, as well as the historic importance of the river and rail transportation corridor to the local economy.

== History ==
The history recognized by the NHLD designation began in 1688 with the first colonial land grants and continues to the end of country house development in the area around 1940. It can be divided into several phases: the colonial era when only Clermont Manor stood, the post-Revolutionary period in the early 19th century when more houses were built in newer architectural styles, the later 19th and early 20th century when the area became less attractive to wealthy homebuilders, and the later 20th century when efforts to preserve and protect the properties began.

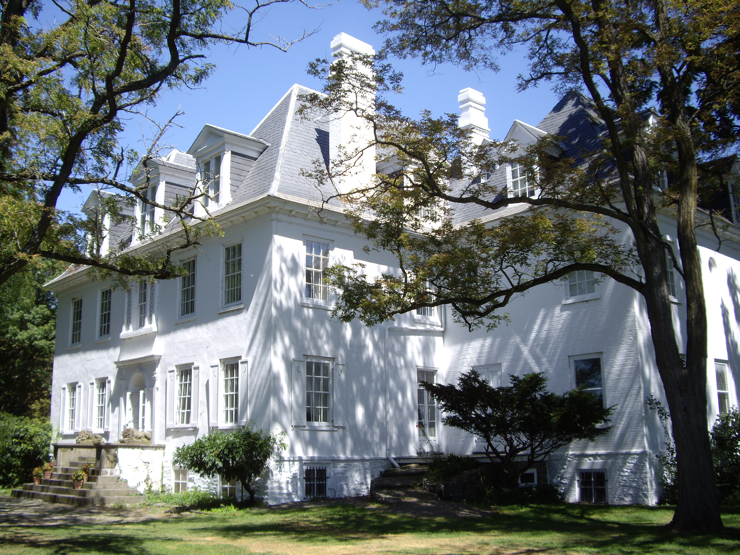
Clermont Manor

=== Colonial era ===
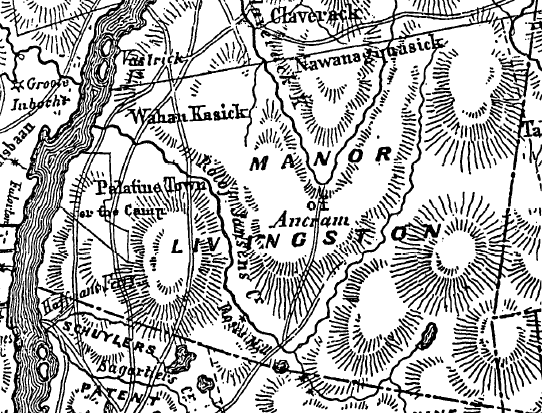
1779 map of Livingston Manor

Robert Livingston the Elder was the first member of the family to obtain the patent on the 160,000 acres (650 km^{2}) that would later become identified with his family. His son Robert Livingston Jr. established the first country seat on Livingston Manor in the 1730s when he built Clermont, reserving the entire 2,000 acres (8.1 km^{2}) that fronted on the river for himself. He designed Clermont carefully to be a working farm as well as an estate, to be made financially viable when portions further inland were leased in portions to tenant farmers. The sweeping view of the lands further emphasized the Livingstons' dominance over many of the lands visible. This, as well as Clermont's name and position, strategically overlooking the Hudson and its commercial traffic, was influenced strongly by European feudal practices, setting a pattern other estates in Livingston Manor were to follow long after his lifetime.

His son Judge Livingston followed feudal tradition further by marrying Margaret Beekman, daughter of Henry, another large local landowner whose holdings were concentrated around present-day Rhinecliff, which grew up around them. Beekman lived at Kipsbergen, a Dutch-style stone house that burned down in the early 20th century. Its appearance is recalled in the peaked roof of the Rhinebeck post office, built in 1940. Judge Livingston participated in the Stamp Act Congress. His son, Robert helped draft the Declaration of Independence.

He and Margaret would have nine children. The eldest, Robert R. Livingston, built another estate, Belvedere, just south of Clermont. In retaliation for the family's revolutionary activities, in October 1777, the British burned both Clermont and Belvedere.

Around the time of the Revolution, Margaret Beekman Livingston, had begun parcelling out smaller tracts of her holdings to her children. This led to the construction of another dozen estates during the early years of the new nation. They were joined by her son-in-law, Governor Morgan Lewis, who settled on 334 acres (1.35 km^{2}) south of Rhinecliff in 1790 and built a small house there.

=== 19th century ===
At first, some of the younger Livingstons' estates followed the British colonial patterns of Clermont. Rhinebeck House, today known as Grasmere, is the best-preserved example. Later on the houses began to show the influence of contemporary French tastes, abandoning the large central hall in favor of smaller rooms and passageways inside and focusing more attention on the garden side of the house, which usually faced the river and mountains as well. Montgomery Place, built by Janet Livingston Montgomery after the death of her husband Richard, is the only example from this period that remains largely as it was when first built.

A direct French presence, in the form of a visiting French friend of Robert Livingston's, was also responsible for creating Tivoli. He laid out streets and a plan for Red Hook Landing, a small boat-building town on the river, and renamed it. His plans were never fully realized, but they did guide the community's development. In 1870 it incorporated as a village, taking in the adjacent commercial center of Madalin.

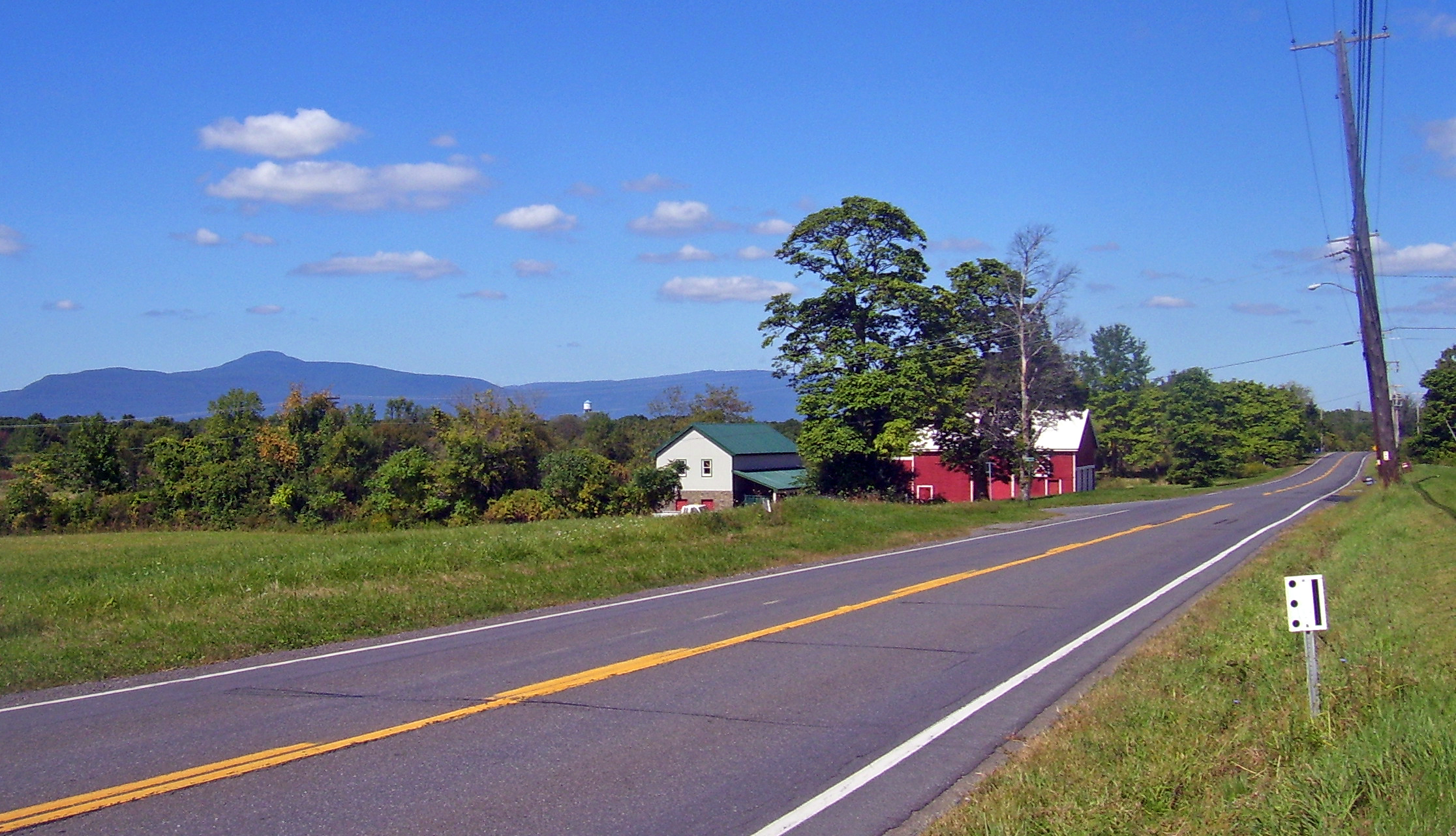
View across the Hudson Valley to Catskills from Livingston lands today

The Romanticism that flourished in the succeeding years drew a good deal of its inspiration from the Hudson Valley, in the form of the Hudson River School in painting and the architectural theories of Andrew Jackson Downing, put into practice there and elsewhere by his protegés Calvert Vaux and Frederick Clarke Withers as well as Richard Upjohn and Alexander Jackson Davis. "No part of the United States had a more correct kind of Romantic scenery to offer", wrote Catskill historian Alf Evers.

The Livingstons took full advantage of this gift dumped into their laps by a whim of the gods. They appropriated the Catskills as a feature of their landscape and as a source of aesthetic pleasure to Livingstons and their guests ... [F]rom the Livingston country, the entire eastern wall of the Catskills with its higher peaks rising within the wall may be grasped in one delighted glance.

Many of the then-popular locust trees were planted on the Livingston estates to frame the views. The Livingstons, as was customary for the owners of large country estates at the time, opened their grounds to the public on weekends as parks, and to this end followed Downing's theories of landscaping by building curving paths and rustic benches and shelters from which to admire the river and distant mountains.

The Livingstons also spurred the population of the area through the tenants they attracted to work the farms. Many were poor German immigrants, who settled in the area from the 1710s onward because other settlers were wary of the feudal "three-life" leases the Livingstons had traditionally offered, under which the property reverted to the original landowner if it could not be paid off in the lifetime of the original lessee, his son and grandson after him (It rarely was). Occasionally these led to "Anti-rent Wars", uprisings that sometimes directly affected the landlords, as in 1832 when Lewis's mansion was burned, supposedly by angry tenants. He replaced it with a 25-room Greek Revival home, the root of the current structure.

Those who did not go into farming settled instead into the hamlets that served them, starting with Rhinecliff, where ferries crossed the river to Kingston. The completion of the railroad stimulated the development of not only Rhinecliff, which took that name in 1849 from the railroad station, but Barrytown as well, where an icehouse was built in what had previously been a landing between the Massena and Edgewater estates into a small community. Another hamlet, Staatsburg, sprung up around the station near William Dinsmore's "Locusts on Hudson" in the 1860s and 70s.

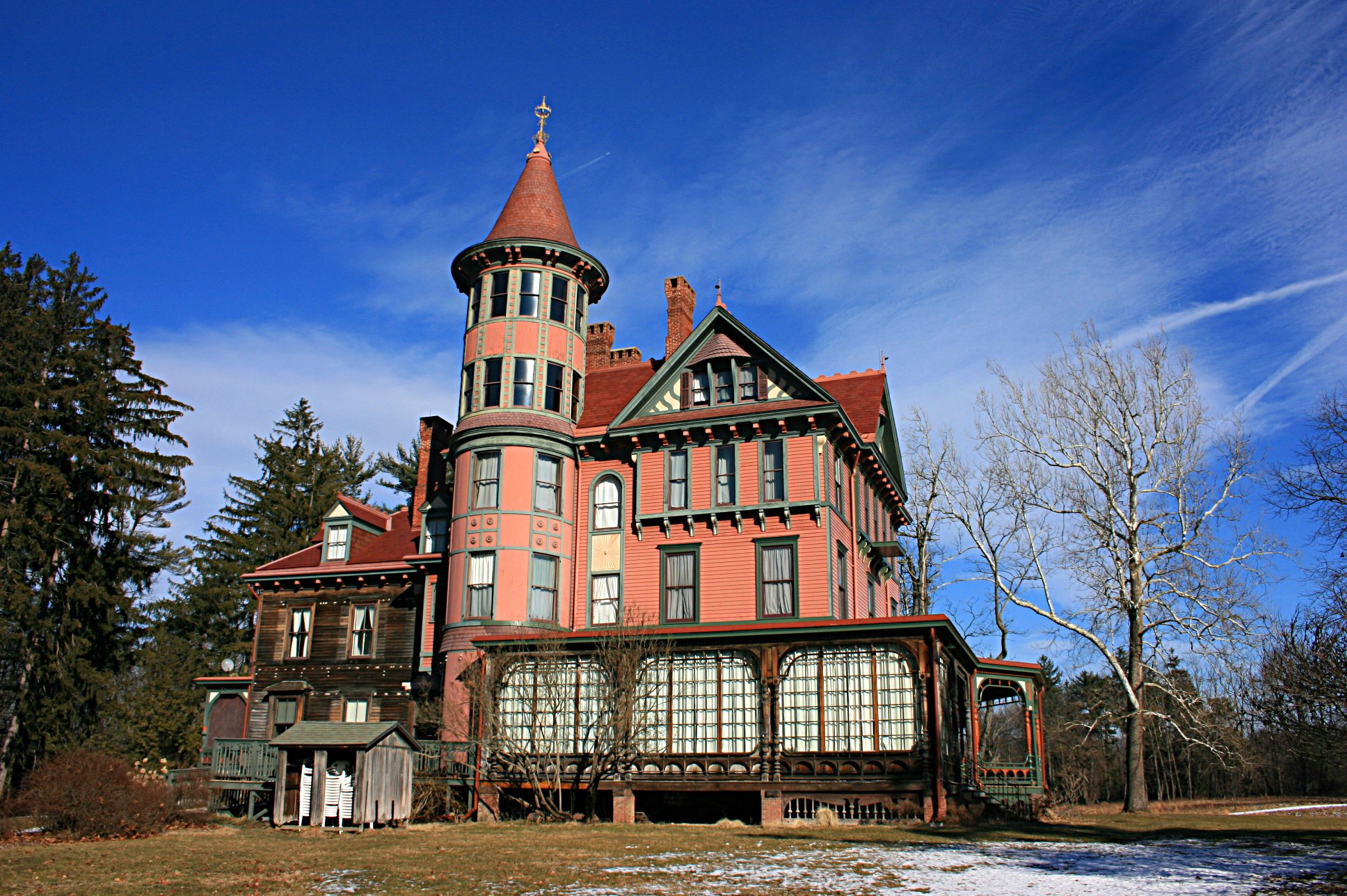
Wilderstein, a late 19th-century estate house

As the century wore on, into the Victorian period, the houses became more idiosyncratic and individualistic. Estates like Wyndcliffe, Wilderstein, Ferncliff and Rokeby sported towers and other ornamentation. By 1865, there were thirty such houses. The Livingstons' hold on the area diminished through the continuing divisions of their property and the abolition of three-life leases under a new state constitution in 1840. Newer families, such as the Astors, moved in to take their place. Many of their homes were set among the winding rural roads that had served to divide the farmed portions of property, closer to the river, from the estates and surrounding gardens. They built picturesque stone walls and elaborate gateways that enhanced the rural character of the landscape but also served to emphasize the exclusivity of ownership. Private pathways and roads connected the newer estates directly to each other, further segregating the estate dwellers from the public.

=== 20th century ===
Livingston Manor's prestige began to diminish somewhat in the later years of the century. The new money of the Gilded Age had come from industrialization, not landownership, and preferred newer hot spots like Long Island and Newport for its summer mansions and retreats, or followed Jay Gould and the Rockefellers in building or improving estates further downriver, closer to the city.

The influence of the newer wealth and its tastes on design and living was still felt along the Hudson most in the changed approach to the pleasure grounds around the estates. What had once been used for gardening and ornamental farms was now used for recreation, and some of the earliest golf courses, tennis courts and country clubs were built on the country seats.

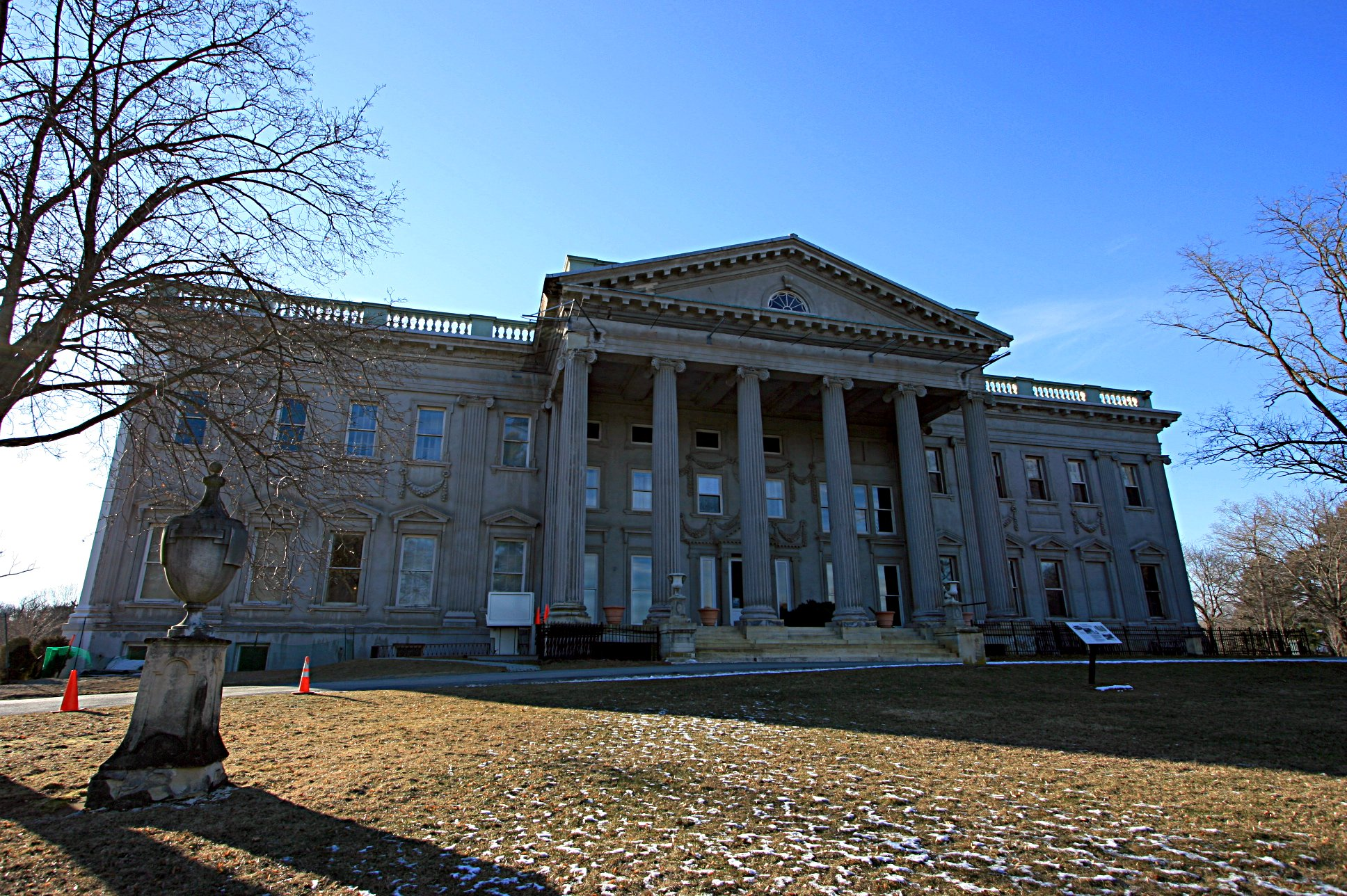
Mills Mansion, designed by Stanford White

Some significant new buildings were added to the future district during this period. Stanford White converted Lewis's old home into a new mansion for Ogden Mills, as well as doing some renovations at Rokeby. Another Astor had Mott B. Schmidt design Valeur, and Charles A. Platt designed an American Renaissance home for the Chapman family. The last major country seat came when Harrie T. Lindeberg built Fox Hollow on the thousand acres (4 km^{2}) Tracy Dows had acquired.

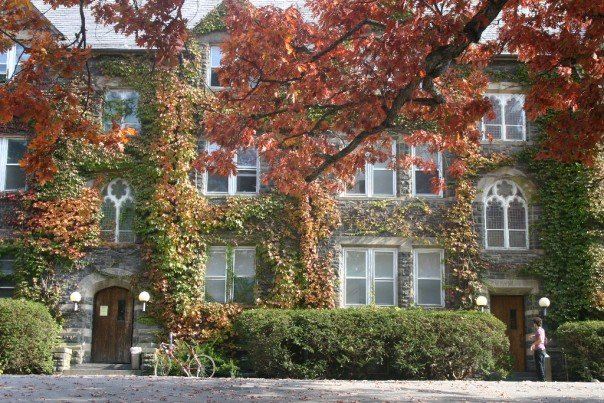
Stone Row dormitories built in the 1880s – Bard College

In 1860, the Bard family had provided money so that a small Episcopal seminary near their Tivoli estate could be expanded into St. Stephen's College, later renamed after them. It eventually expanded into three of the former country seats. This was the beginning of a second life for some of the old country seats, as some moved out of private residential use and became institutions. The Catholic Church received Ellerslie, Ferncliff and Linwood, using them for various purposes. Dorothy Day made Rose Hill the location of one of the Catholic Worker Movement's farms during the 1960s.

By the 1930s, many of the old estate houses were becoming difficult to keep up and burdens on family fortunes that were being divided as the Livingstons' had once been. Some survived by selling and subdividing the farms to offset rising property taxes. Others, like Clermont, the Mills Mansion and Wilderstein, were eventually given to the public or private trusts and turned into museums of the life once led in them.

The end of the country-seat era and of any major new construction locked the existing buildings and their architectural styles in place. At the same time the rise in automotive transportation and attendant road improvements, particularly the bridge, made the district more accessible than before. Preservation efforts in the wake of the establishment of the National Register of Historic Places led to the 1979 creation of the Clermont Estates Historic District in Columbia County and the Sixteen Mile District to its south. Shortly afterwards, the state Department of Environmental Conservation designated the area the state's first scenic district. Later research by the group Hudson River Heritage led to findings that the two needed to be combined into a larger district extending as far south as the Mills Mansion, and that it was significant and well preserved enough to be accorded National Historic Landmark District status. The National Park Service (NPS) added it to the list in 1990.

== The district today ==
On account of the scenic views and history, houses in the district command a high price. The desirability of open space overlooking the river is a source of constant development pressure on the district, as builders look to serve buyers priced out of growing suburbs further south in the valley, yet still looking for a rail commute to the city via Amtrak or Metro-North (via Poughkeepsie). The district boundaries had to be drawn to exclude one newer subdivision near Staatsburg, but had to include one in Tivoli.

To protect the district's historic character, the Town of Rhinebeck, at least a third of which is included in it, has adopted local ordinances which govern the potential demolition of historic buildings as well as creating a special historic-preservation zoning district for those areas.

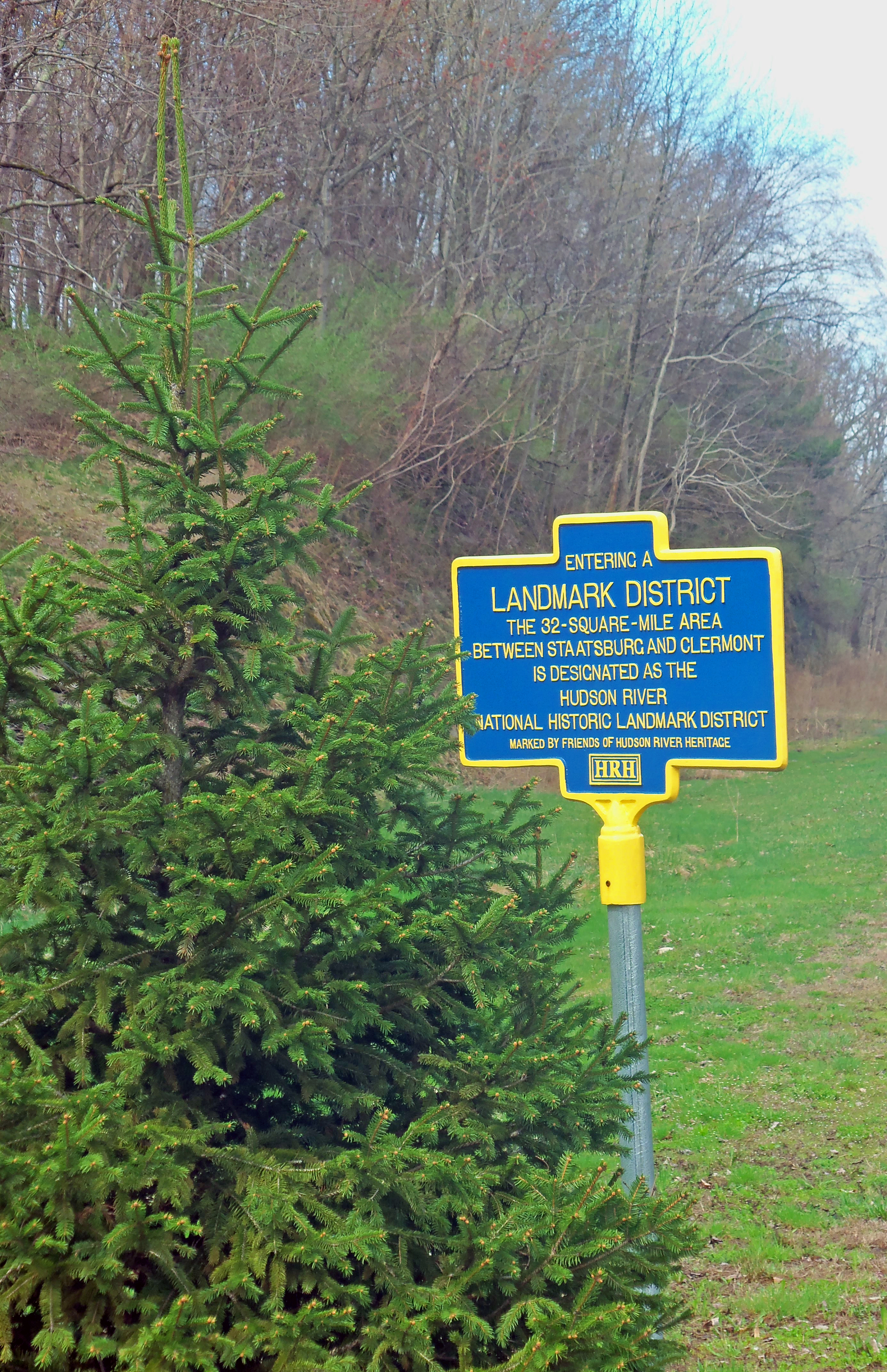
One of the few historical markers for the district, on NY 199 in Rhinebeck.

The other municipalities with land in the district have not gone quite to this extent. Hyde Park has created a historic overlay district which applies to all historic properties in the town, providing in the case of the Hudson River Historic District that land use within its boundaries "shall obtain site plan approval and shall be limited to an agriculture, water-dependent and/or water-enhanced use or to a use appropriate to preservation of the historic resources of the district". Clermont, Red Hook and Tivoli have so far not chosen to apply any additional standards and continue to preserve the district through their existing zoning and applicable New York state laws requiring historical and environmental reviews in certain areas.

The district's boundaries have not been expanded since its creation and designation, but there is some interest in doing so. The Town of Germantown has formally expressed its intention to have the northern boundary extended from the Clermont line to the hamlet of Germantown.

== Aesthetics ==
The estate houses generally followed the pattern established by Clermont — a house with a river and mountain view surrounded by "pleasure grounds", with an approach road from the east so as to reveal the vista only at the house. The farm leaseholds were usually located further inland. This accounts for the large areas of open space still apparent in the district today.

The tenant farms also boasted distinct architecture, mostly vernacular styles. Most notable among them would have been the wooden, center-aisled New World Dutch barn, often built before the farmhouse. In the pre-industrial era, it could store all the animals and equipment necessary for growing and harvesting wheat, the region's primary cash crop, as well as the harvest itself. Several remain standing.

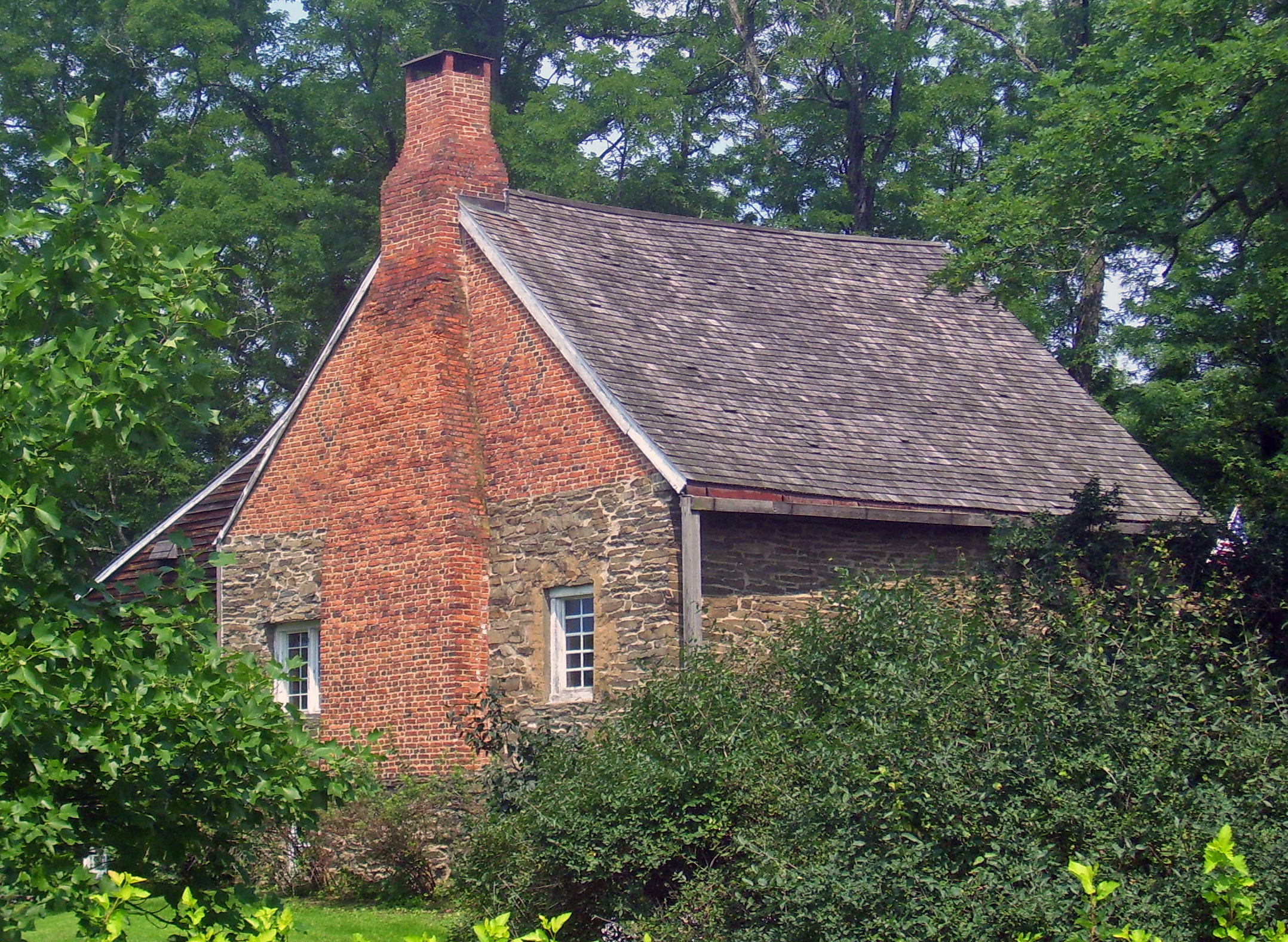
The Stone Jug

Farmhouses were, in the colonial era, often small two-story structures. It was not uncommon for them to be razed if the landlord desired to extend the estate to the farm property and move the tenants further east; as a result most of the surviving ones are made out of stone, such as Clermont's Stone Jug and Rhinebeck's Fredenburg House, since they were harder to demolish. Later in the 18th century, after independence, the tenants' homes echoed the Neoclassical aspirations of their landlords, as well as similar trends in Germany. Around Clermont, some two-story wood-frame farmhouses with five-bay facades and centrally located entrances remain from this period.

The advent of Romanticism began to show in the farmhouses around the mid-19th century, shortly after its debut in the estates. Like their neoclassical predecessors, they took as much inspiration from popular German forms as from the landowners' homes. The farmhouses built during this period are large, square, hipped-roof structures with ponderous cornices and large porches to match. While there are no houses in this style left in the district, some older barns and other farm buildings show it.

Church stylings gradually show some difference between those where the landlords worshipped and their tenant counterparts. Early churches hosted both, with the oldest example in the district being the plain white frame Red Church along Route 9G in Red Hook, dating to the early years of the 19th century. Later on, the wealthy began building churches and chapels for their private or exclusive use, and these, such as the chapel on the Clarkson property on 9G, show more ornament than the older churches.

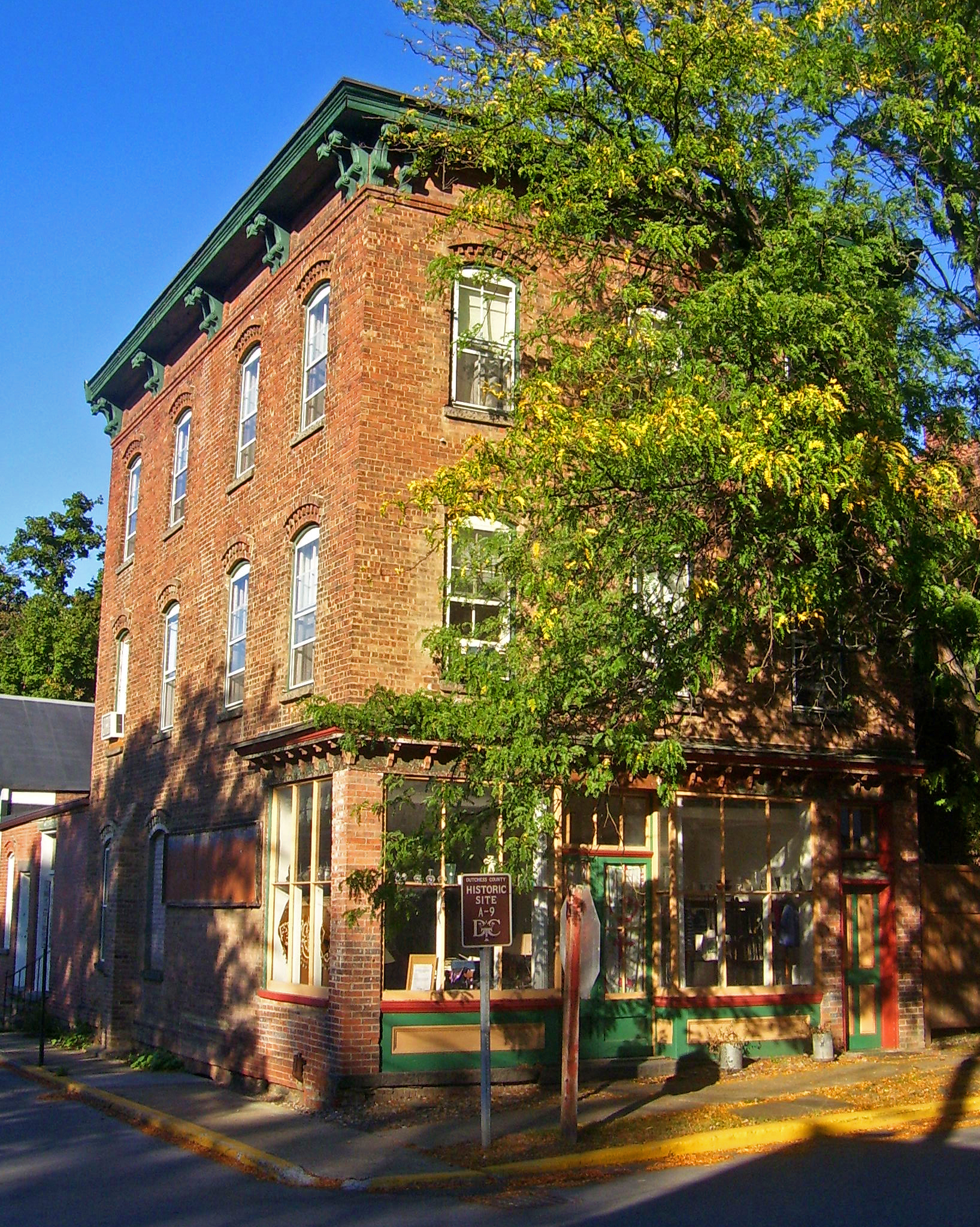
The O'Brien General Store, a prominent commercial property in Rhinecliff.

The hamlets, particularly Rhinecliff and Tivoli, also reflect the area's original land distributions. Many of their houses are small two-story frame structures in Victorian styles that occupy small lots on narrow streets. Commercial buildings, in the core neighborhoods, usually occupy the ground floors of such houses or small brick buildings. The landowners often donated money for various public buildings like churches and schools, such as Rhinecliff's Morton Memorial Library.

== Cultural legacy ==
The district has influenced American culture and history beyond its art and architecture. In 1807, Robert Fulton's North River Steamboat, stopped at Clermont for an hour on its maiden voyage up the Hudson. It was the first commercial steamship voyage; the boat itself would later be renamed Clermont in recognition of Robert Livingston's patronage and investment.

Several statesmen have called the district home besides the many from the Livingston-Beekman family. Egbert Benson, a congressman, federal judge and the first attorney general of New York, built his law practice in what would later be Tivoli. John Winthrop Chanler, another congressman, married Margaret Astor Ward, who had inherited Rokeby through her Livingston / Astor forebears. His son Lewis served as a state assemblyman and lieutenant governor. Another son, William Chanler, also served briefly in Congress. Another son, Robert, was Dutchess County sheriff and an accomplished painter. John Watts de Peyster, Civil War general, military historian and adjutant general of the New York National Guard, also spent some of his formative years at Rose Hill in Tivoli, and later built the firehouse now used as village hall. Another New York Civil War figure, Charles S. Wainwright, lived at The Meadows.

Franklin Delano Roosevelt's ancestral home in Hyde Park is just south of the district, but some of his Delano ancestors were longtime residents of the Steen Valetje estate. As a child, his wife Eleanor lived at Oak Lawn, the Tivoli estate of her grandmother Mary Ludlow Hall, for several years after the death of her mother.

The district has had a role in literature as well, both as a setting and a residence. Henry James, a frequent visitor to his uncle's home at Linwood, makes several references to Rhinebeck and other locales within the district in his writings. Edith Wharton, likewise a childhood visitor to her aunt at Wyndclyffe, used the district as a setting in many of her works. Thomas Wolfe lived in a gatehouse at Fox Hollow while writing Look Homeward, Angel, and Aldous Huxley lived there for a time in the 1930s.

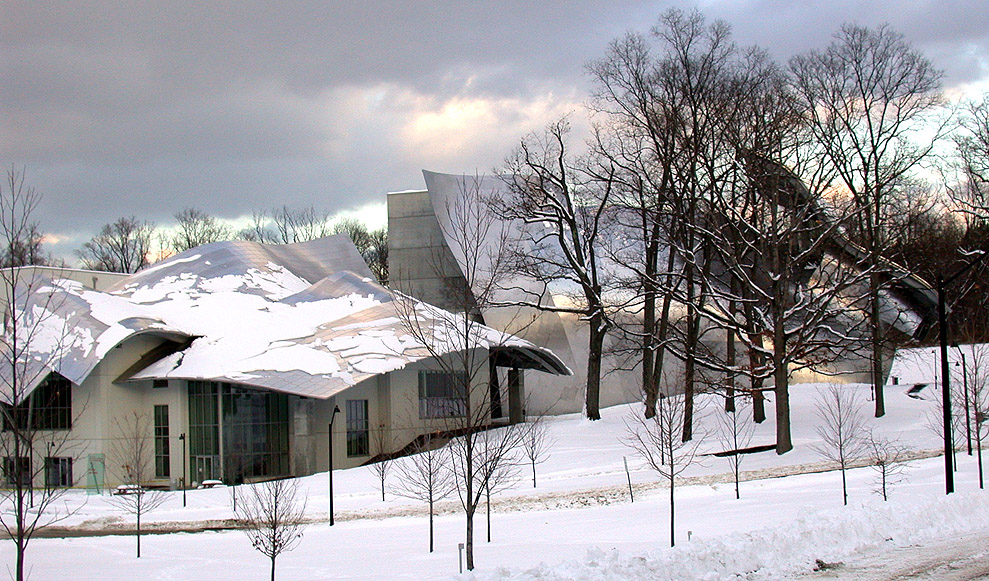
Bard's Fisher Center

Bard College has played an increasing role in the district's cultural impact. Its faculty has included Hannah Arendt and John Dewey, and the former is buried there with her second husband Heinrich Blücher. The college's alumni have included many figures in late 20th-century popular culture. Two of them, Walter Becker and Donald Fagen, cofounded the rock group Steely Dan, and wrote two songs about Bard and places near it: "My Old School", from Countdown to Ecstasy; and "Barrytown", on Pretzel Logic. In 2003, the Frank Gehry-designed Richard B. Fisher Center for the Performing Arts brought innovative contemporary architecture back to the district. The irregularly shaped metal panels on its roof echo the view of the Catskills across the river, the district's original attraction.

== Contributing properties ==
Historic properties listed in Historic American Buildings Survey that may be within the district include:

- The Meadows, near Rhinebeck
  - The Meadows, Stable cottage
  - The Meadows, Stables and carriage house
- Wyndcliffe near Rhinebeck
- Wilderstein in Rhinebeck
- Wildercliff near Rhinebeck
- Rose Hill, near Tivoli
- Montgomery Place, near Barrytown
  - Swiss cottage
  - Farmhouse
  - Annandale Road
- Edgewater (Barrytown, New York) one time country estate of Gore Vidal.
- La Bergerie also known as Rokeby, in Barrytown
- Rhinecliff – Kingston (Amtrak station)

== See also ==
- List of National Historic Landmarks in New York
- National Register of Historic Places in Dutchess County, New York
