= Rhinecliff Hotel =

- U.S. National Register of Historic Places
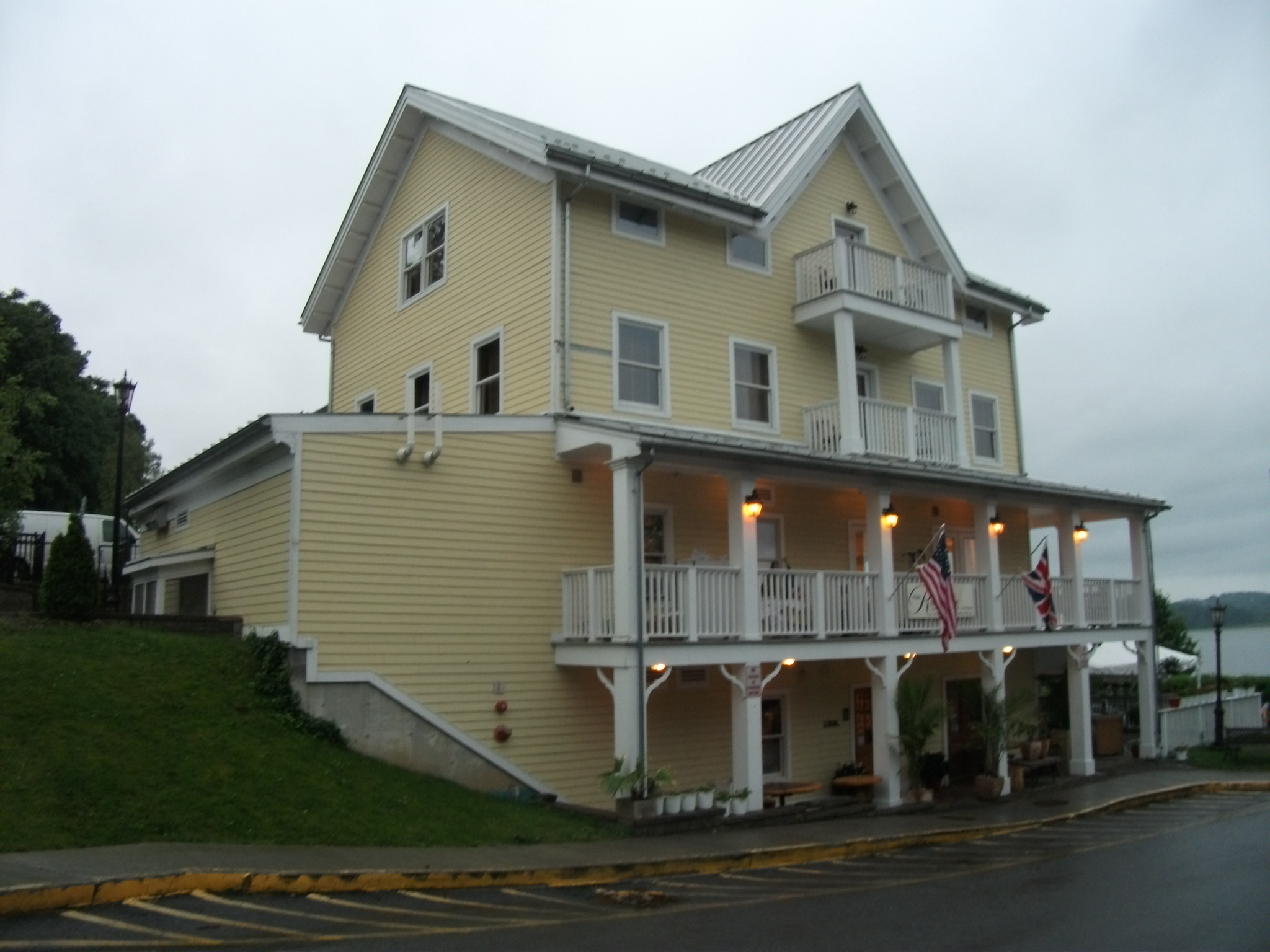
- Rhinecliff Hotel, June 2011

- Location within New York Location within the United States
- Location: Schatzell Ave., Rhinecliff, New York
- Coordinates: 41°55′11″N 73°57′10″W
- Area: less than one acre
- Built: 1855
- Architect: Veitch, George
- MPS: Rhinebeck Town MRA
- NRHP reference No.: 87001087
- Added to NRHP: July 9, 1987

Rhinecliff Hotel is a historic hotel located at Rhinecliff, Dutchess County, New York. It was built about 1855 and is a two- to three-story, L-shaped frame building. It is built into the side of a steep hill and features a two-story verandah and cross-gable roof. Also on the property is a contributing carriage shed / garage.

It was added to the National Register of Historic Places in 1987.
