= Wyndcliffe =

Coordinates: 41.8886°N 73.9374°W

- U.S. National Historic Landmark District – Contributing property
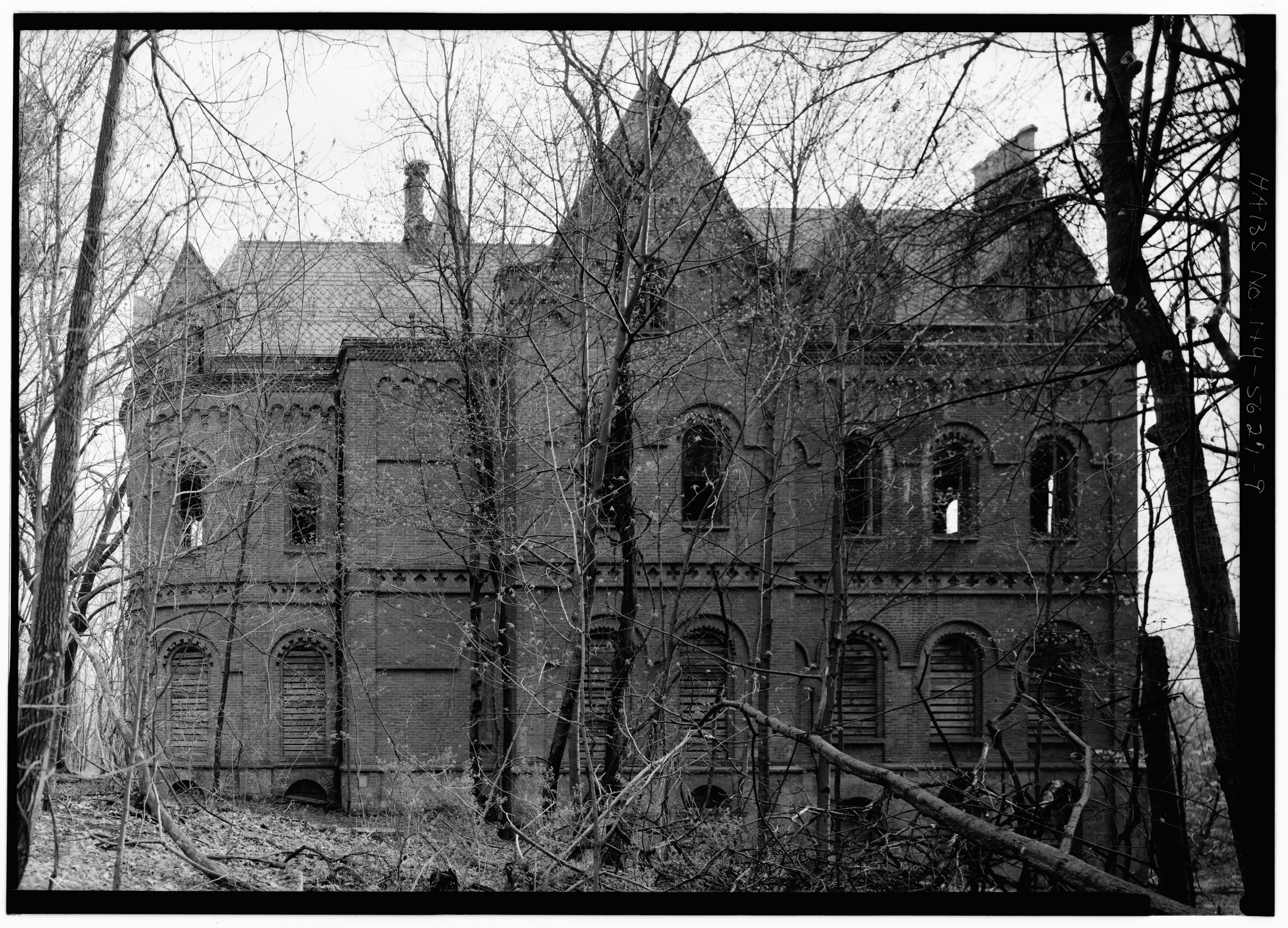
- HABS north view of Wyndcliffe from 1979.
- Location: Rhinecliff
- Architect: George Veitch
- Architectural style: Norman
- Part of: Hudson River Historic District (ID90002219)

Significant dates
- Added to NRHP: December 14, 1990
- Designated NHLDCP: December 14, 1990

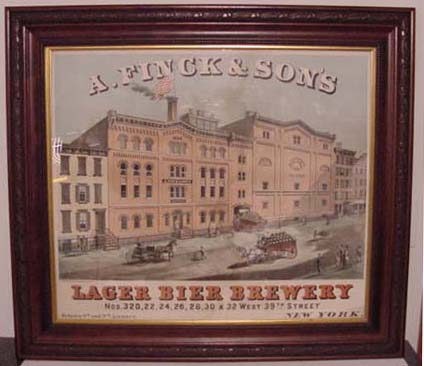
A. Finck & Son's Brewery, circa 1870.

Wyndcliffe is an historic mansion near Rhinebeck in Dutchess County, New York. The records at the Library of Congress state that the brick mansion was originally named Rhinecliff and constructed in 1853 in the Norman style. The mansion was built for New York City socialite Elizabeth Schermerhorn Jones (1810–1876) as a weekend and summer residence. The design is attributed to local architect George Veitch. A master mason, John Byrd, executed the highly varied ornamental brickwork using only rectangular and few molded bricks. After decades of abandonment and neglect the mansion had become a dilapidated property.

Writer Edith Wharton was a frequent childhood visitor; it influenced her 1929 novel Hudson River Bracketed. Wharton called the house "Rhinecliff" (after the nearby hamlet of Rhinecliff) in her 1933 memoirs A Backwards Glance; contrary to popular rumor, the hamlet was not named after the house. The phrase "keeping up with the Joneses" is thought to originate from the lavish balls that Jones threw at Wyndclyffe.

== History ==
The mansion was built for socialite Elizabeth Schermerhorn Jones in 1853. In 1886, the mansion and land was sold by the executors of the will of Elizabeth S. Jones to Andrew Finck (1829–1890) for $25,000. Wyndcliffe was later known as Linden Hall or Finck Castle, for those subsequent owners. Andrew Finck was a New York City brewer whose son August Finck (1854–1905) and grandson August Finck Jr. (1879–1915) operated one of the larger breweries in New York City. A. Finck & Son's Brewery, 320–332 W. 39th St, Manhattan, NYC, produced Enterprise, a light lager beer from 1870 to 1911. Andrew Finck's nephew, John Henry Finck (1843–1881) operated a prosperous feed and flour business at 600 N. 11th Ave, Manhattan.

Upon the death of Jacob Finck (1816–1880) (John's father/Andrew's brother), Andrew Finck, his son August Finck Sr., and grandson August Finck Jr. were named executors of the Jacob Finck estate. They immediately closed the feed and flour business, leaving John Finck unemployed and penniless with a wife and four small children. Several months later, on 2 May 1881, John Finck committed suicide by hanging himself between two railroad cars.

The mansion passed from Andrew to his son, August, in 1901 and then to his grandson, August Jr. Theodore Finck (1883–1923) purchased Wyndcliffe from his brother, August Jr.'s, estate in 1919 for $24,000. Theodore died in the mansion in 1923, identifying his daughter Anna Wolf Finck Rice (1879–1963) in his last will as his sole devisee. The mansion and 31.8 acres passed to Nissan S. Hanoka, Rebecca Hanoka and Mrs. Victori Hazen in 1927 for $100 plus a $5,000 mortgage. In 1934, the property was awarded back to Anna Wolf Rice for $1,117.94 at foreclosure auction, and then passed through several subsequent owners from 1936 onward.

The mansion became vacant sometime around 1950. Originally situated on 80 acres including waterfront access to the Hudson River, the property was eventually reduced to 2.5 acres. Portions of the mansion have collapsed after an extended period of abandonment.

== Restoration attempts ==
In 2003 the mansion was sold; the new owner planned to restore the house and erected a security fence around the property. However the announced plans never came about while images taken around that time showed that major sections of the second story had collapsed.

In September 2016, as part of a bankruptcy auction, the house was sold for $120,000. The new buyer applied for, and was granted, a permit to demolish the remaining structure but did not carry that out, since even the demolition price, at $75,000, was excessive. The structure was again sold in 2017 to a Manhattan-based developer. John Barboni, who with his brother Mark bought it for $170,000, recalled that the house had "caught his eye" when it was auctioned the first time but that he had forgotten about it until it came back up for sale. by December 2022, the developer hired a structural engineer and submitted an emergency stabilization plan with Rhinebeck Planning Board. As of May 2026 the mansion is a secured and active construction site with stabilization work in progress by a local construction firm. The deteriorated tower framing had been replaced. Stabilization work is anticipated to be completed by the end of 2026. Plans for the rebuilding phase would then be submitted for local government approval.
