= Wilderstein =

- U.S. Historic district – Contributing property
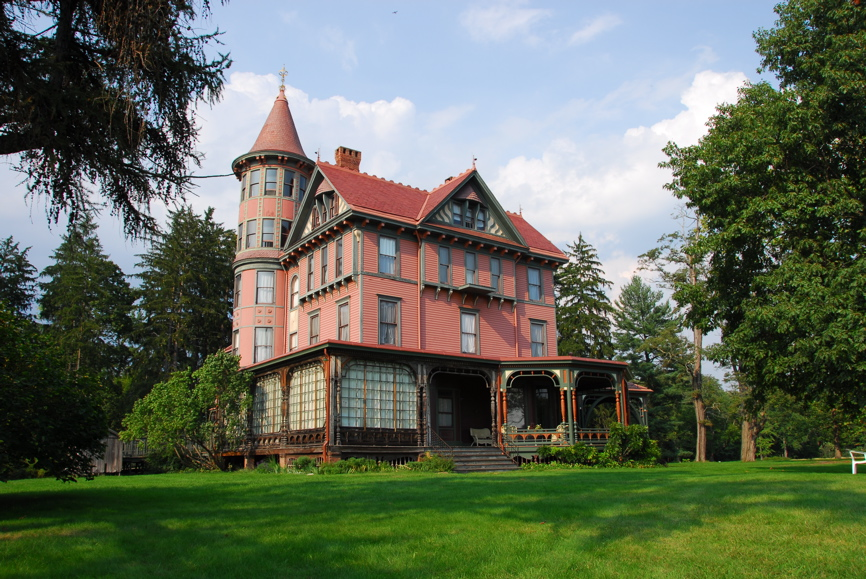
- The Wilderstein Mansion

- Location within New York Location within the United States
- Interactive map showing the location for Wilderstein
- Location: 330 Morton Road, Rhinebeck, NY
- Coordinates: 41°53′38.40″N 73°56′31.81″W
- Built: 1852–53; 1888
- Architect: John Warren Ritch (construction, 1852); Arnout Cannon (remodeling, 1888); Joseph Burr Tiffany (interior decoration, 1888)
- Architectural style: Queen Anne
- Part of: Hudson River Historic District (ID90002219)
- Designated CP: December 14, 1990

Wilderstein is a 19th-century Queen-Anne-style country house on the Hudson River in Rhinebeck, Dutchess County, New York, United States. It is a not-for-profit house museum.

== Background ==
Thomas Holy Suckley was a wealthy property developer in Manhattan. He was the son of devout Methodist George Suckley and his second wife Catherine Rutsen. George settled in New York City and became agent for the British mercantile establishment that would later become Holy, Newbould, & Suckley. He was well-acquainted with most of the prominent Methodists of the time and active in supporting their ministry.

Thomas Suckley's mother Catherine was the daughter of John Rutsen, whose maternal grandfather was Gilbert Livingston, son of Robert Livingston, Lord of Livingston Manor. John Rutsen was a close friend of Catherine Livingston Garrettson, the wife of the notable Methodist preacher, Freeborn Garrettson (1752–1827). In 1799, the Garrettsons purchased 160 acres in Rhinebeck, New York, where they established an estate called Wildercliff, and welcomed many circuit riding Methodist preachers. Frequent visitor Francis Asbury called it "Traveler's Rest". Around 1850, the estate passed to their only child, Mary Rutherford Garrettson.

== History ==
The Wilderstein property was originally part of the Wildercliff estate. In August 1852, Thomas Suckley purchased from Mary Garrettson thirty-two acres of river-front property, which until then had served as a sheep meadow for the adjacent Wildercliff estate. (Mary Garrettson's mother Catherine was the granddaughter of Gilbert Livingston's older brother, Robert Livingston of Clermont).

Suckley and his wife Catherine Murray Bowne chose the property as a building site for their mansion, because they considered the landscape a good match for their picturesque aesthetic ideal. The name "Wilderstein" ("wild stone" in German) was chosen by Suckley to allude to an American Indian petroglyph found nearby and reflect the site's historical significance.

In total, three generations of the Suckley family inhabited the mansion. The last family member was Daisy Suckley, a cousin of Franklin D. Roosevelt for whom she trained his famous terrier Fala. Daisy Suckley died in the Wilderstein mansion in 1991, six months before her 100th birthday. The mansion is nine miles up-river from FDR's Hyde Park Home, Springwood.

== Description ==
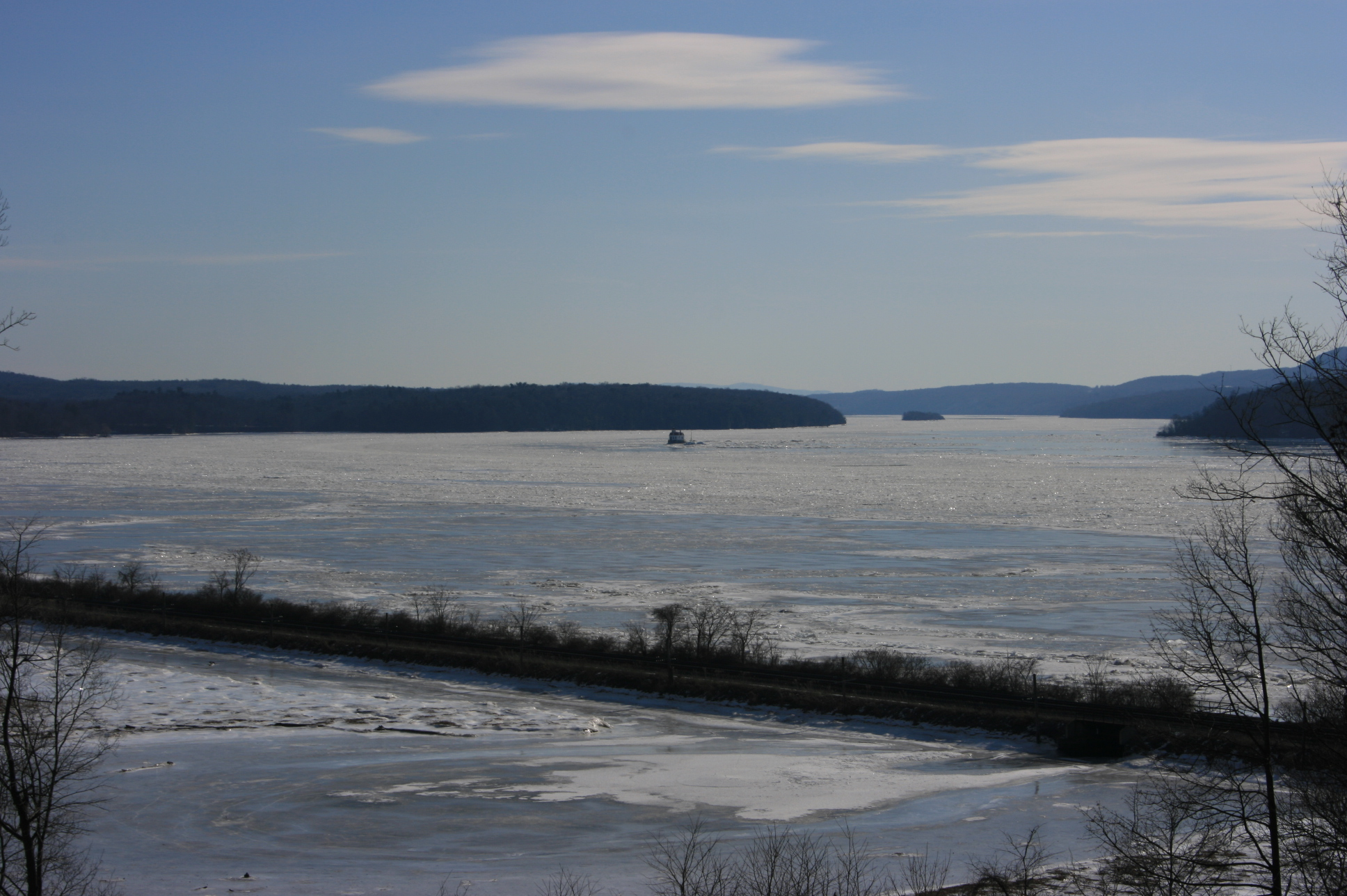
View of the Hudson River from Wilderstein

The mansion commissioned for the site was a plain two-story Italianate villa designed by architect John Warren Ritch of New York. Construction began in December 1852 and completed in the autumn of 1853.

In 1888, Thomas Suckley's son Robert Bowne Suckley and his wife, Elizabeth Philips Montgomery, undertook a remodelling and enlargement of the house. This work was carried out by the architect Arnout Cannon of Poughkeepsie. The style of the mansion was changed to the eclectic Queen Anne style. A third floor, a multi-gabled attic, a circular five-storey tower, a porte-cochère, and a verandah were added in the process. The new interior of the building was designed by Joseph Burr Tiffany, a cousin of Louis Comfort Tiffany. The rooms of ground floor were done in the Aesthetic Movement style using materials such as use mahogany, leather, stained glass, and linen.

In parallel to the redesign of the mansion proper, the grounds of the estate were transformed by landscape architect Calvert Vaux according to the American Romantic Landscape style. Vaux's design comprised the creation of a network of drives and trails, the positioning of specimen trees and ornamental shrubs as well as the placement of an eclectic set of out buildings such as a carriage house, a gate lodge, and a potting shed. Gazebos and garden seats were positioned at carefully chosen vantage points.

== Preservation ==
Daisy Suckley was instrumental in forming Wilderstein Preservation, a private non-profit organization. She opened the house to the public at Christmas 1984. The society is a recognized charity by the IRS; donations are tax deductible. Although little restoration work was carried out during her lifetime, responsible stewardship is becoming the norm now that concerned parties are supplying funds. For example, the tower was renovated in 1994, the main roof replaced in 1997, the siding on the second and third floor was restored in 2001, repairs on the porte-cochere and the north porch in 2002, and restoration work on the verandah in 2006.

== Location ==
The address of the mansion is 330 Morton Road, Rhinebeck, NY 12572, New York. It is a contributing property to the Hudson River Historic District and a National Historic Landmark.
