= Clermont Estates Historic District =

Historic district in New York, United States

- U.S. National Register of Historic Places
- U.S. Historic district
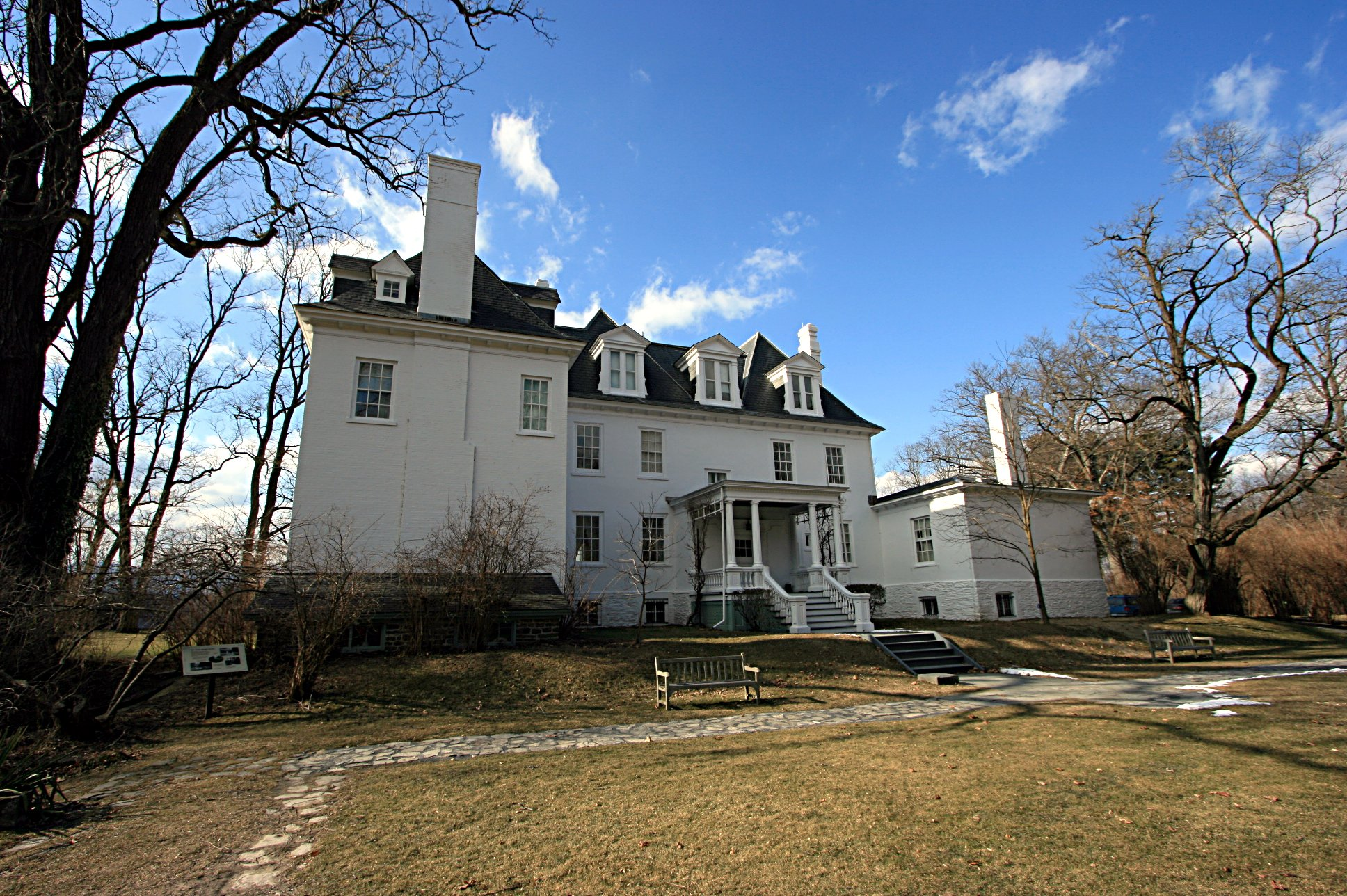
- Clermont Manor

- Location within New York Location within the United States
- Nearest city: Germantown, New York
- Coordinates: 42°6′7″N 73°54′53″W
- Area: 1,125 acres (455 ha)
- Architectural style: Colonial Revival, Greek Revival, Renaissance
- NRHP reference No.: 79001572
- Added to NRHP: May 7, 1979

Clermont Estates Historic District is a national historic district located near Germantown in Columbia County, New York, which was listed on the National Register of Historic Places in 1979. When listed, it included 34 contributing buildings, including the Clermont Manor, which is also a New York State Historic Site. In 1990, the district was subsumed, along with the Sixteen Mile District, into the Hudson River Historic District.
