= Joseph Burr Tiffany =

American interior designer

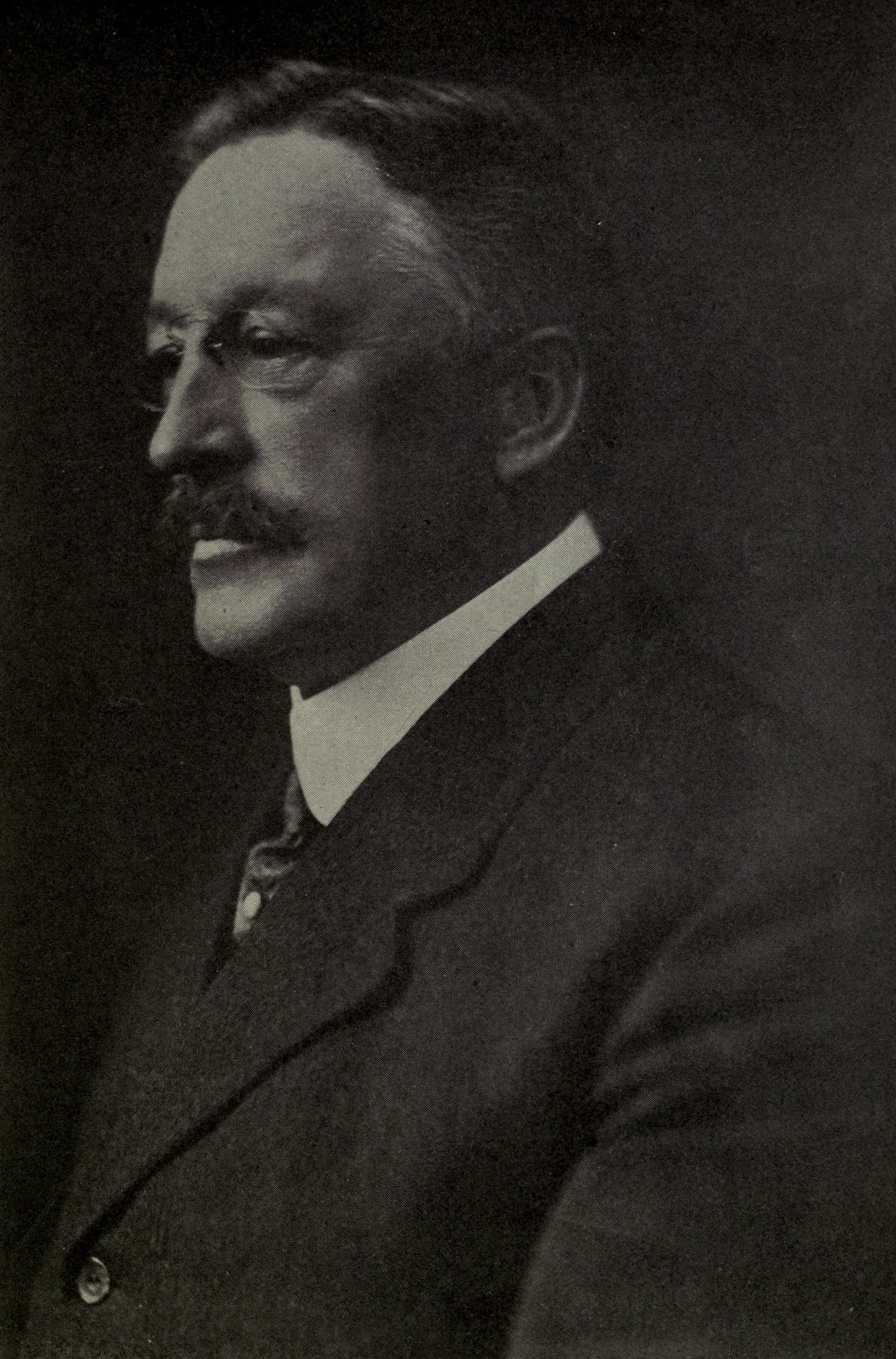
Joseph Burr Tiffany.

Joseph Burr Tiffany (February 13, 1856 - April 3, 1917) was an American interior designer of the late 19th century, today best known for his 1889 decoration of the first floor of Wilderstein, the Rhinebeck, New York home of the Suckley family. His firm, J.B. Tiffany and Co., was active from 1888-1891.

Around 1897 Tiffany became associated with Steinway pianos, and was manager of that company's Art Piano Department until his retirement in 1912. In that capacity, he supervised the design and execution of the first Steinway piano presented to the White House, during the administration of Theodore Roosevelt. That 1903 piano, decorated by Thomas Wilmer Dewing and Maria Oakey Dewing, remained in the White House until 1938, when it was replaced by another Steinway and retired to the Smithsonian.

In the early years of the 20th century, century Tiffany became involved with George Ashdown Audsley in the Art Organ Company, which set out to provide "artistic" organs suitable for residences.

Tiffany died at his home in Yonkers, N.Y. on April 3, 1917.

Joseph Burr Tiffany was a cousin of Louis Comfort Tiffany, the businessman/artist who created Tiffany stained-glass and lamps; Louis Comfort Tiffany was the son of Charles Lewis Tiffany, the founder of New York jewelers Tiffany & Co.
