= Wildercliff =

Historic house in New York, United States

- U.S. National Register of Historic Places
- U.S. National Historic Landmark District – Contributing property
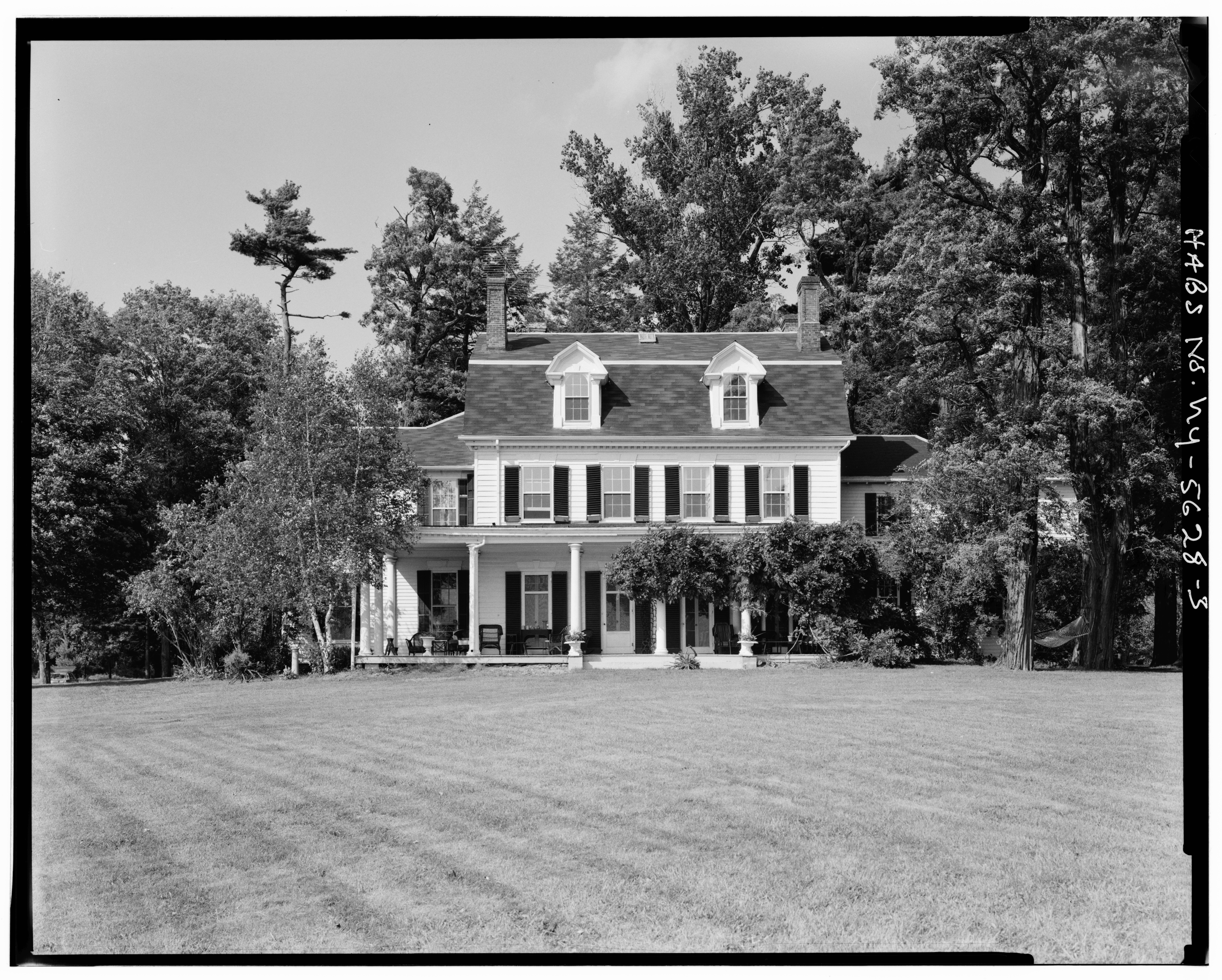
- HABS image of the front yard of Wildercliff from an unknown date.
- Location: Mill Road Rhinebeck, New York, U.S.
- Part of: Hudson River Historic District
- NRHP reference No.: 90002219

Significant dates
- Added to NRHP: December 14, 1990
- Designated NHLDCP: December 14, 1990

Wildercliff is a privately owned estate on Morton Road, in Rhinebeck in Dutchess County, New York. It was the home of noted Methodist circuit rider Freeborn Garrettson and his wife, Catherine Livingston, of the Clermont Livingstons. It may be included in the Hudson River Historic District.

== History ==
Wildercliff is a large house with Federal style details situated on a bluff overlooking the Hudson River. Built in 1799, it was the home of the Reverend Freeborn Garrettson (1752–1827), an early circuit riding Methodist minister, and his wife, Catherine Livingston (1752–1849). She was a daughter of Judge Robert and Margaret Beekman Livingston of Clermont, New York, and sister to "Chancellor" Livingston.

The location of Wildercliff was originally part of the Artsen-Kip Patent, one of the Colonial era land patents granted by the British Crown. It subsequently became a farm owned by John Van Wagenen. Garrettson met Catherine Livingston in 1792 while visiting her brother-in-law, Thomas Tillotson at his estate, "Linwood". They were married the following year and took up residence in the Town of Rhinebeck in a small house near the Milan town line. In September 1799, Garrettson purchased 160 acres from Van Wagenen. The sale also included an exchange of land provided by Mrs. Garrettson. The name "Wildercliff" is an Anglicized version of the Dutch "Wilder Klippe" and refers to a petroglyph, first reported in 1877, depicting an Indian with a tomahawk in one hand and a peace pipe in the other carved on a rock at the shoreline of the property. (The area was first occupied by the Mohican.)

In 1802 Garrettson sold eight acres on the northern portion of the property to his brother-in-law, Morgan Lewis. This was in addition to a small riverfront parcel sold the year before. These portions subsequently became part of the "Ellerslie" estate, later home of Vice-President Levi P. Morton.

== Description ==
The house was two stories covered with clapboard, with a gambrel roof. Benson Lossing described it as "modest" in comparison with others in the area, and in keeping with the simple tastes of the owners. The Garrettsons were known for their hospitality to Methodist circuit riders and others. A practice continued by their daughter. According to her father's will, the house was to be the home for a young Methodist clergyman for the first two years of his ministry. Preachers for Rhinecliff and Hillside lived at Wildercliff, which was midway between the two. President of Union College Eliphalet Nott, author Susan Warner, and Edward Eggleston visited. Frequent visitor Francis Asbury called it "Traveler's Rest". This necessitated periodic construction to create more room. A third, dormered story was at some point added.

A veranda was added around 1850; additions were later added to the east and west sides. The property was inherited by the Garrettson's only child, Mary Rutherford Garrettson (1794-1879). Needing more water for the household, Mary Garrettson had a well dug in the lawn north of the house. The water was both pure and cool, and workers on the railroad would climb the long hill up from the river to draw from the well.

== Later history ==
In 1853, Mary Garrettson sold the north pasture to Thomas H. Suckley, the son of George Suckley, a friend of her father's. (Freeborn Garrettson had died at Suckley's home in New York City.) Thomas Suckley then built a country house, Wilderstein. Mary Garrettson died unmarried, celebrated for her kindness and generosity. Suckley purchased Wildercliff from the executors. It then passed to his son, Robert Bowne Suckley, who, however, continued to live at Wilderstein.

Wildercliff remained with the Suckleys until sold in 1958 to Professor and Mrs. Frederick Dupee, who, in turn, sold it to Mr. and Mrs. Richard Rockwell in 1971. Writer Sam Hall, and his wife, the actress Grayson Hall, purchased the estate in 1979. In 2012, journalist Fareed Zakaria and his wife, jewelry designer Paula Zakaria Throckmorton, purchased Wildercliff and completed a substantial restoration of the residence. In 2021, the property was purchased by Wildercliff LLC.

Wildercliff is one of twenty-one contiguous estates along the east bank of the Hudson River between Stratsburg and Tivoli, New York.

== Sources ==
11 photos, 5 measured drawings, and 8 data pages at Historic American Buildings Survey.
