= Asbury United Methodist Church and Bethel Chapel and Cemetery =

Historic site in Westchester County, New York

- U.S. National Register of Historic Places
- U.S. Historic district
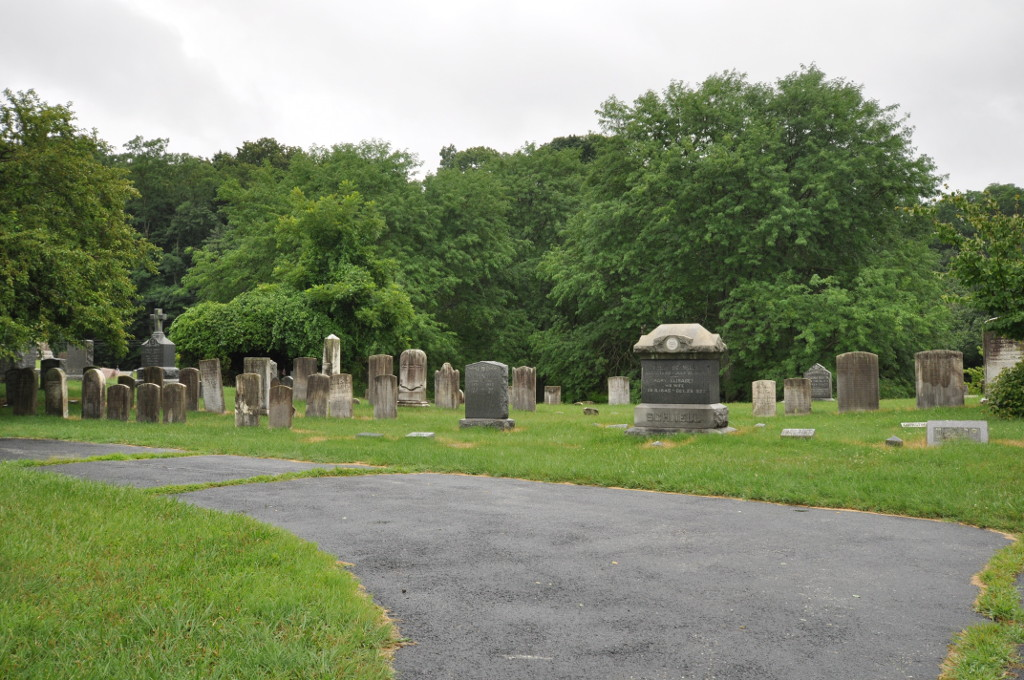
- Bethel Cemetery

- Location within New York Location within the United States
- Location: 19 Old Post Rd. and Old Post Rd. S, Croton-on-Hudson, New York
- Coordinates: 41°12′26″N 73°52′50″W
- Area: 6.8 acres (2.8 ha)
- Built: 1790
- Architectural style: Late Victorian, Federal
- NRHP reference No.: 00000310
- Added to NRHP: March 31, 2000

Asbury United Methodist Church and Bethel Chapel and Cemetery is a national historic district containing a Methodist church, chapel, and cemetery at 19 Old Post Road in Croton-on-Hudson, Westchester County, New York.

The church was built in 1883 and is a rectangular brick building with a multi-colored slate-covered gable roof in the Gothic Revival style. It features large Gothic-arched stained and leaded glass windows added in 1891 and a square, engaged, two stage tower. The chapel was built about 1790 and is a 1 1/2-story, two-by-two-bay, clapboard-sided building on a granite foundation. Francis Asbury (1745–1816) is known to have visited the chapel on September 20, 1795. The cemetery is in two sections and contains about 5,000 graves; the date of the earliest burial is 1801. It includes the grave of noted playwright and author Lorraine Hansberry (1930–1965).

The land for the chapel and cemetery was donated to the Methodist Church by Pierre Van Cortlandt, the first lieutenant governor of New York and owner of Van Cortlandt Manor. The Van Cortlandts were friendly and hospitable to the Methodists, and some became active church members. They allowed the Methodists to preach from their porch and also provided a site on their property for the annual Methodist camp meetings. One of the guest rooms in Van Cortlandt Manor House was known as "Prophet's Chamber," quite possibly in honor of Francis Asbury, "the Prophet of the Long Road." It was often occupied by Freeborn Garrettson and other Methodist ministers.

The property added to the National Register of Historic Places in 2000.

== See also ==
- National Register of Historic Places listings in northern Westchester County, New York
