= Freeborn Garrettson =

American minister (1752–1827)

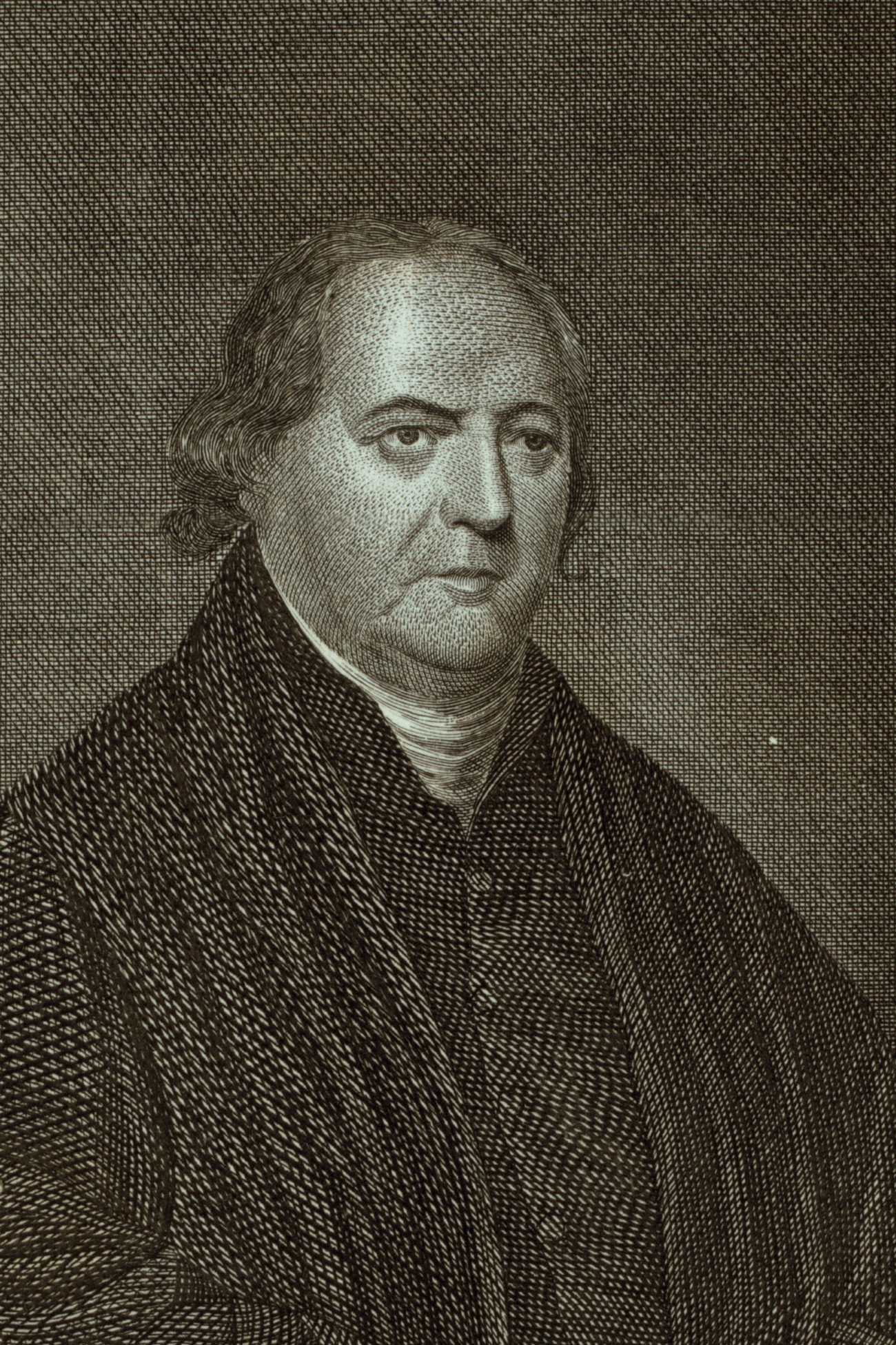
- The Rev. Freeborn Garrettson, aged 73
- Born: August 15, 1752; Harford County, Province of Maryland, British America
- Died: September 26, 1827 (aged 75); Village of Rhinebeck, New York, United States of America
- Occupation: Clergyman
- Spouse: Catherine Livingston (m. 1793)
- Children: 1

Freeborn Garrettson (August 15, 1752 – September 26, 1827) was an American clergyman, and one of the first American-born Methodist preachers. He entered the Methodist ministry in 1775 and travelled extensively to evangelize in several states. He was called Methodism's "Paul Revere". Garrettson was an outspoken abolitionist.

== Early life ==
Born in 1752 on the west side of the Chesapeake Bay at the mouth of the Susquehanna River in Maryland, what is known today as Bush River Neck, Freeborn Garrettson was the third generation in his family to live there. The Garrettson family owned a large amount of land which included a farm, a general store, and a blacksmith shop. The Garrettson estate was a prosperous property made more valuable by the numerous slave families who ran the various businesses of the estate.

Growing up in a wealthy Anglican family allowed young Garrettson to receive a proper education for the offspring of well-to-do farmers by the standards of the time. The curriculum was rich in religious and social principles. The instruction focused on basic reading, writing, and arithmetic, but also included bookkeeping, surveying and astronomy. He later inherited his parents' plantation and a large number of slaves.

== Career ==
=== Conversion experience ===
"'Do you know what a saint is? A saint is one who is wholly given up to God.' The voice is so real as if someone is talking to me face to face. The question stirs my heart." This is the beginning of the conversion experience of Freeborn Garrettson.

This audible encounter is not the first divine event for Freeborn Garrettson. Just prior to the question of knowing what a saint is, he experiences another audible event. The statement which Freeborn Garrettson heard clearly was, "Ask and it shall be given you." Who was asking? According to the nine-year-old Freeborn Garrettson, these were audible requests from God. Yes, Freeborn Garrettson expressed hearing an audible voice in each of these instances. Much like the Old Testament character of Joseph, the inspirational events cause him to race home and tell his siblings, even going as far as to predict from an additional encounter that he is going to be a wealthy man someday. After his "knowing what a saint is" episode, he writes in a journal that he "saw such a person, the most beautiful of any I had ever beheld, I...prayed to the Lord to make me a saint."

Shortly after these supernatural happenings at the age of 10, Freeborn Garrettson faced tragedy. In a series of events, he lost his mother, his sister Sally, and two family servants. This ushered in a sensitivity to depression and melancholy, causing his spiritual yearnings to lie dormant for nearly ten years.

Almost a decade later, the preaching of Methodist itinerants Robert Strawbridge and Joseph Pilmoor serve to awaken the spiritual yearnings in Freeborn Garrettson. Despite the stellar efforts of these traveling preachers, the completion of the conversion to Christianity of Freeborn Garrettson would not be complete until the active mentoring of the British itinerant, Francis Asbury. By 1776, Freeborn Garrettson became one of Asbury's traveling itinerants.

=== Anti-slavery stance ===
Not long after Garrettson inherited several slaves, he freed them. Garrettson wrote that a "voice" moved him to do so. His journals divulge an anti-slavery stance, but do not reveal the extent of his activism. His preaching against slavery resulted in his being thrown in jail in Cambridge, Maryland. A wave of voluntary emancipation mirrored and followed Garrettson's time on the Delmarva peninsula. By 1810, 76% of African Americans in Delaware were free, though slavery remained legal in Delaware. Garrettson wrote on the issue of slavery, including a published work, "A Dialogue Between Do-Justice and Professing Christian." Garrettson's preaching on the Delmarva led directly to the emancipation of Richard Allen, who upon his return to Philadelphia founded the Bethel Church and then the African Methodist Episcopal (A.M.E.) denomination.

=== Role in American Methodism ===
Kenneth E. Rowe's foreword to the book American Methodist Pioneer, which presents Garrettson's journals, begins,"Freeborn Garrettson was unquestionably the most competent native born Methodist preacher in the American colonies in the founding period."

Garrettson first became a Methodist preacher in 1775. Early in his career, he served the faithful of the Delmarva Peninsula. Although he favored the revolutionary cause, he refused to fight in the American Revolution and was placed in jail for a time in Maryland. Most of the Methodist preachers who had come from England before the outbreak of the war returned there once the war began.

He traveled so often and so regularly in the service of Methodism that some came to call him the Methodist Paul Revere.

=== Missionary in Nova Scotia ===
In 1784, Garrettson went as a missionary to Nova Scotia, which led to the founding of Methodist congregations in Cape Negro and the free black settlement of Birchtown, Nova Scotia. He followed in the wake of Henry Alline and focused much of his work on the areas where Alline had previously spread Methodism. Garrettson ranged widely throughout Nova Scotia and preached in almost every settlement in the colony. Among other areas that he opened to Methodism was Shelburne, Nova Scotia. Among those he brought into the Methodist fold while in Nova Scotia was James Man.

=== Movement to New York ===
In the late 1780s, Garrettson settled in the village of Rhinebeck, New York, to bring Methodism to its inhabitants. He held the first Methodist church services in the Benner House on Mill Street. He was a frequent guest at Van Cortlandt Manor in Croton-on-Hudson, preaching at the Bethel Chapel.

He married Catherine Livingston in 1793, and they had one daughter.

=== Methodist leader ===
Garrettson was ordained a Methodist elder at the 1784 conference in Baltimore where the Methodist Episcopal Church was organized. Garrettson's preaching ranged from North Carolina to Nova Scotia. He was a firm supporter of centralized control of the Church. After settling in New York Garrettson continued to be a Methodist circuit rider. He and his wife made their home a regular place for other circuit riders to stop and recuperate. During Garrettson's time as a minister, Methodism rose from obscurity to a place of importance among American religions.

He died at his estate, Wildercliff, in the village of Rhinebeck, on September 26, 1827. Garrettson is buried in the cemetery of the Rhinebeck Methodist Church.
