= Rhinecliff, New York =

- Census-designated place
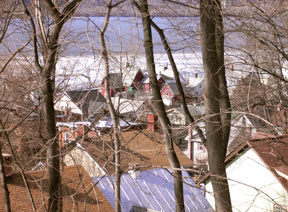
- Rhinecliff rooftops overlooking the Hudson River in winter

- Location of Rhinecliff, New York
- Coordinates: 41°55′10″N 73°57′4″W
- Country: United States
- State: New York
- County: Dutchess
- Town: Rhinebeck

Area
  - Total: 1.04 sq mi (2.70 km^{2})
  - Land: 1.03 sq mi (2.66 km^{2})
  - Water: 0.015 sq mi (0.04 km^{2})
- Elevation: 55 ft (17 m)

Population (2020)
  - Total: 380
  - Density: 370/sq mi (142.8/km^{2})
- Time zone: UTC-5 (Eastern (EST))
  - Summer (DST): UTC-4 (EDT)
- ZIP Codes: 12574 (Rhinecliff); 12572 (Rhinebeck)
- Area code: 845
- FIPS code: 36-61368
- GNIS feature ID: 962439

Rhinecliff is a hamlet and census-designated place (CDP) located along the Hudson River in the town of Rhinebeck in northern Dutchess County, New York, United States. As of the 2020 census, Rhinecliff had a population of 380.

== History ==
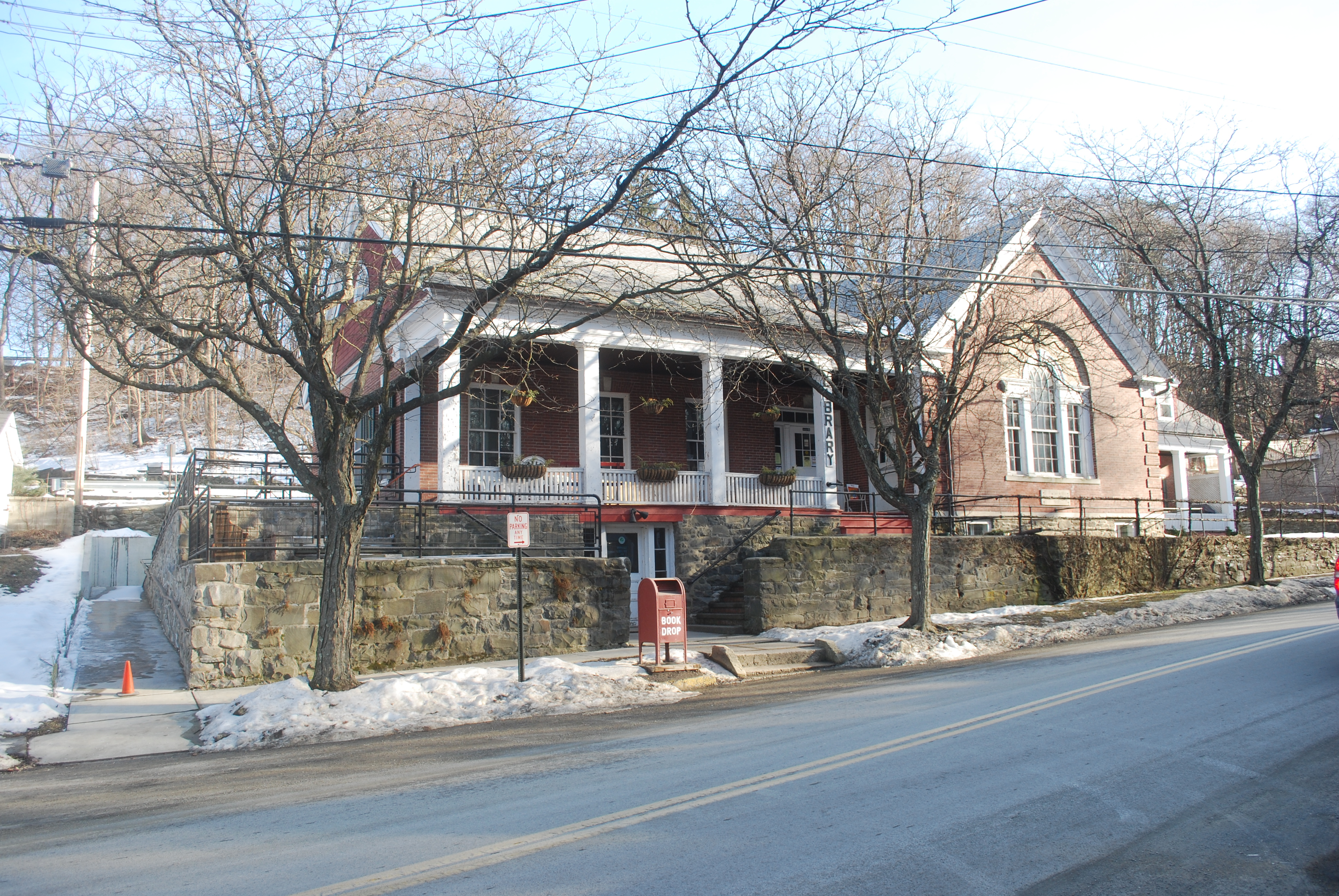
Morton Memorial Library

Today's Rhinecliff was founded by Europeans in 1686 as the town of Kipsbergen by five Dutchmen, among them Hendrikus and Jacobus Kip. They moved from Kingston on the west bank to live in the new settlement along the eastern shore of the Hudson. By this time England had already taken over New Netherland, the former Dutch colony that included Manhattan.

The Hudson River Railroad's Rhinebeck station opened in 1851 at Slate Dock and was relocated south to Shatzell's Dock the next year. Charles Handy Russell, a real estate developer and owner of the ferry service to Kingston, created a small village around the relocated station. It was originally called Shatzellville, then Boormanville after railroad president James Boorman. Russell's architect and builder, George Veitch, invented the name "Rhinecliff" in reference to Rhinebeck and the nearby cliffs. (Contrary to popular rumor, the hamlet was not named after the Wyndcliffe estate, which was never formally called "Rhinecliff".) The Rhinecliff Hotel opened around 1855, and the post office was renamed Rhinecliff in 1861.

Anna L. and Levi P. Morton, who owned the nearby Ellerslie estate, constructed and endowed the Morton Memorial Library in Rhinecliff in memory of their daughter Lena. It was dedicated as a library in 1908.

== Geography ==
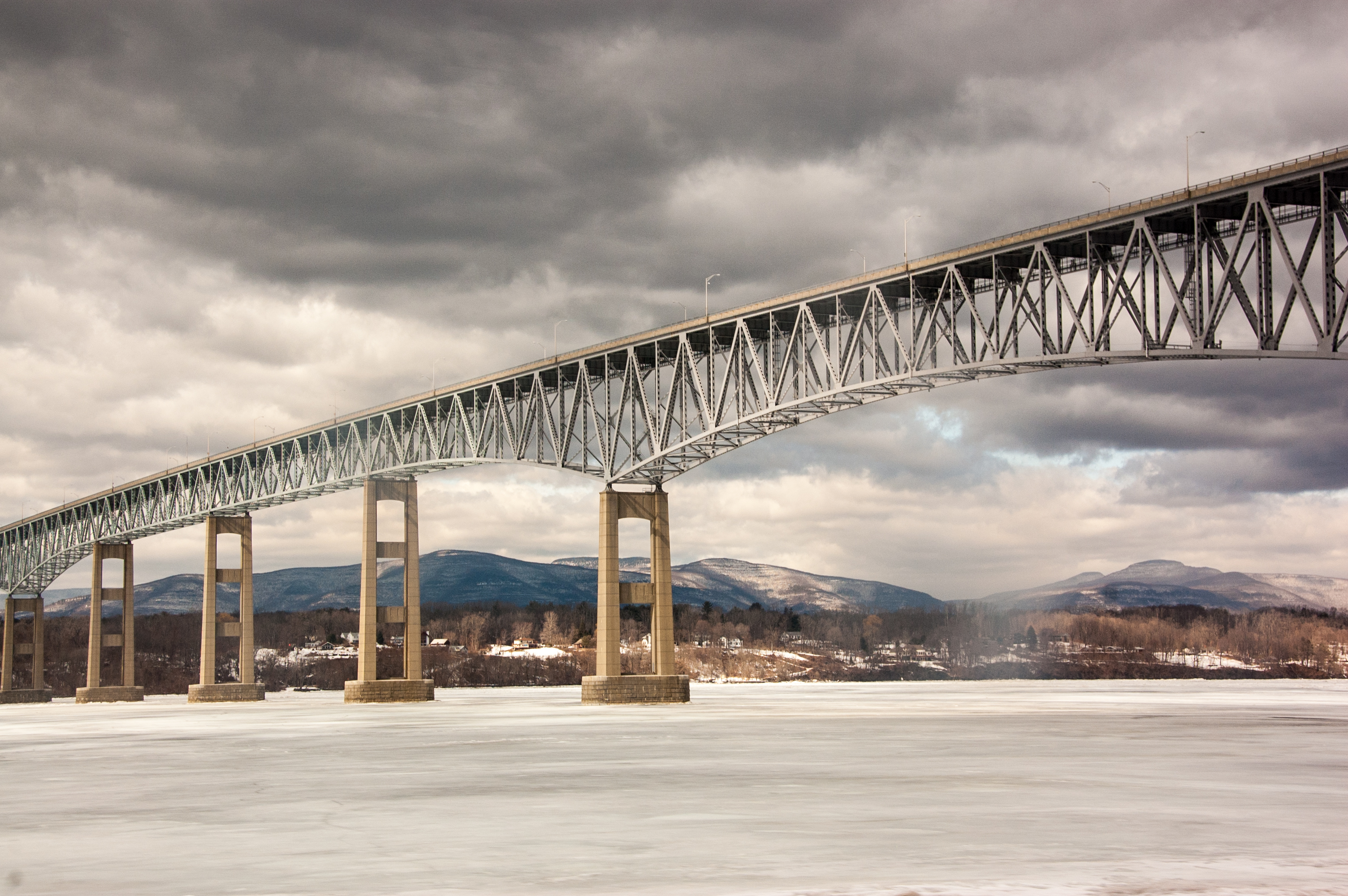
Kingston-Rhinecliff Bridge

Rhinecliff is located in the western part of the town of Rhinebeck, 1 mile (1.6 km) west of Rhinebeck village. It is directly across the Hudson River from the city of Kingston. The closest river crossing is the Kingston–Rhinecliff Bridge (New York State Route 199), 4 miles (6 km) to the north. According to the U.S. Census Bureau, the Rhinecliff CDP has a total area of 1.0 square mile (2.6 km^{2}), of which 0.02 square miles (0.04 km^{2}), or 1.37%, is water.

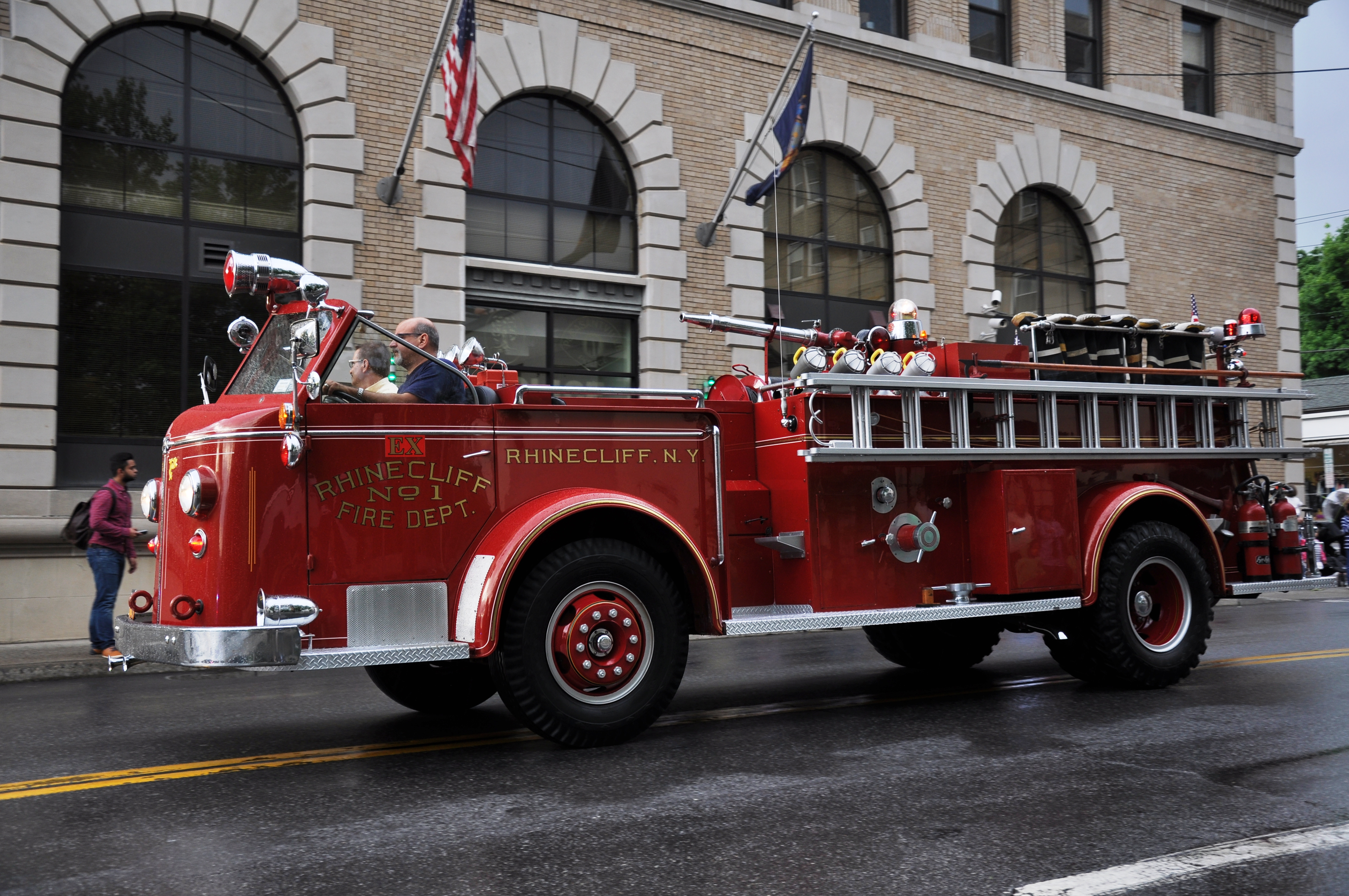
Rhinecliff Fire Department antique

Rhinecliff is one of the oldest intact hamlets along the Hudson River and is listed in the National Register of Historic Places as a contributor to the Hudson River National Historic Landmark District. At 20 miles (30 km) long, this historic district is the largest National Historic Landmark (NHL) designation in the country.

Rhinecliff is also included in the Local Waterfront Redevelopment Program (LWRP). It is designated a Scenic Area of Statewide Significance (SASS), a contributor to the DEC Mid-Hudson Historic Shorelands Scenic District, a contributor to DEC Scenic Roads designations, and is in the Hudson River National Heritage Corridor. The hamlet serves as the water and rail gateway to the larger Town of Rhinebeck.

The hamlet is demarcated by large agricultural and wooded area to the north, east, and south, and bounded by the Hudson River on the west. Steep topography, formed by contorted slate ridges and valleys, define the site-specific and seemingly random orientation of the small, frame nineteenth-century houses and winding narrow roads. The hamlet had a mid-nineteenth-century building boom, but its boundaries and building density have changed very little over the last one hundred years.

Historical population
Census	Pop.	Note	%±
2010	425		—
2020	380		−10.6%
U.S. Decennial Census

== Government ==
As part of the town of Rhinebeck, the hamlet of Rhinecliff is included within the jurisdiction of the town government. In 2005, the Town Board created the Rhinecliff Hamlet Advisory Council to facilitate communications between the hamlet and town. Goals of the Advisory Council are to work with the community on the protection of the historic hamlet, integration of a multi-use greenway connecting the town with the hamlet, appropriate development of the waterfront, and sensitive residential development in outlying areas.

A proposal to build a large contemporary residence overlooking the Hudson on Grinnell Street in the hamlet is generating controversy in Rhinecliff. Several Rhinecliff residents have spoken out against the proposal, objecting to the size of the proposed residence, its modern style, and that it blocks views of the Hudson River and Catskill Mountains. Other Rhinecliff residents have defended the proposal, arguing it will be a beautiful addition to the hamlet and that it blends the historic and the modern in a creative way. In 2014 the matter was before the Rhinebeck Planning Board and Zoning Board of Appeals.

== Education ==
It is within the Rhinebeck Central School District.

== Notable people ==
Nearby notables, past and/or present, have included Levi P. Morton, Vincent Astor, Natalie Merchant, and Annie Leibovitz.

== In popular culture ==
According to her biographer Louis Auchincloss, Edith Wharton was a frequent childhood visitor who later described the Wyndcliffe mansion as "The Willows" in Hudson River Bracketed. In her autobiography, A Backward Glance (1933), Mrs. Wharton wrote about Wyndcliffe and her aunt.

...But no memories of those years survive, save those I have mentioned, and one other, a good deal dimmer, of going to stay one summer with my Aunt Elizabeth, my father's unmarried sister, who had a house at Rhinebeck-on-the-Hudson. ... I can still remember hating everything at Rhinecliff, which, as I saw, on rediscovering it some years later, was an expensive but dour specimen of Hudson River Gothic; and from the first I was obscurely conscious of a queer resemblance between the granite exterior of Aunt Elizabeth and her grimly comfortable home, between her battlemented caps and the turrets of Rhinecliff...

The town is also the setting of the fictional book series The It Girl by Gossip Girl writer Cecily von Ziegesar.

== See also ==
- Morton Memorial Library (Rhinecliff, New York)
- Rhinecliff–Kingston (Amtrak station)
