= Morton Memorial Library (Rhinecliff, New York) =

- U.S. National Register of Historic Places
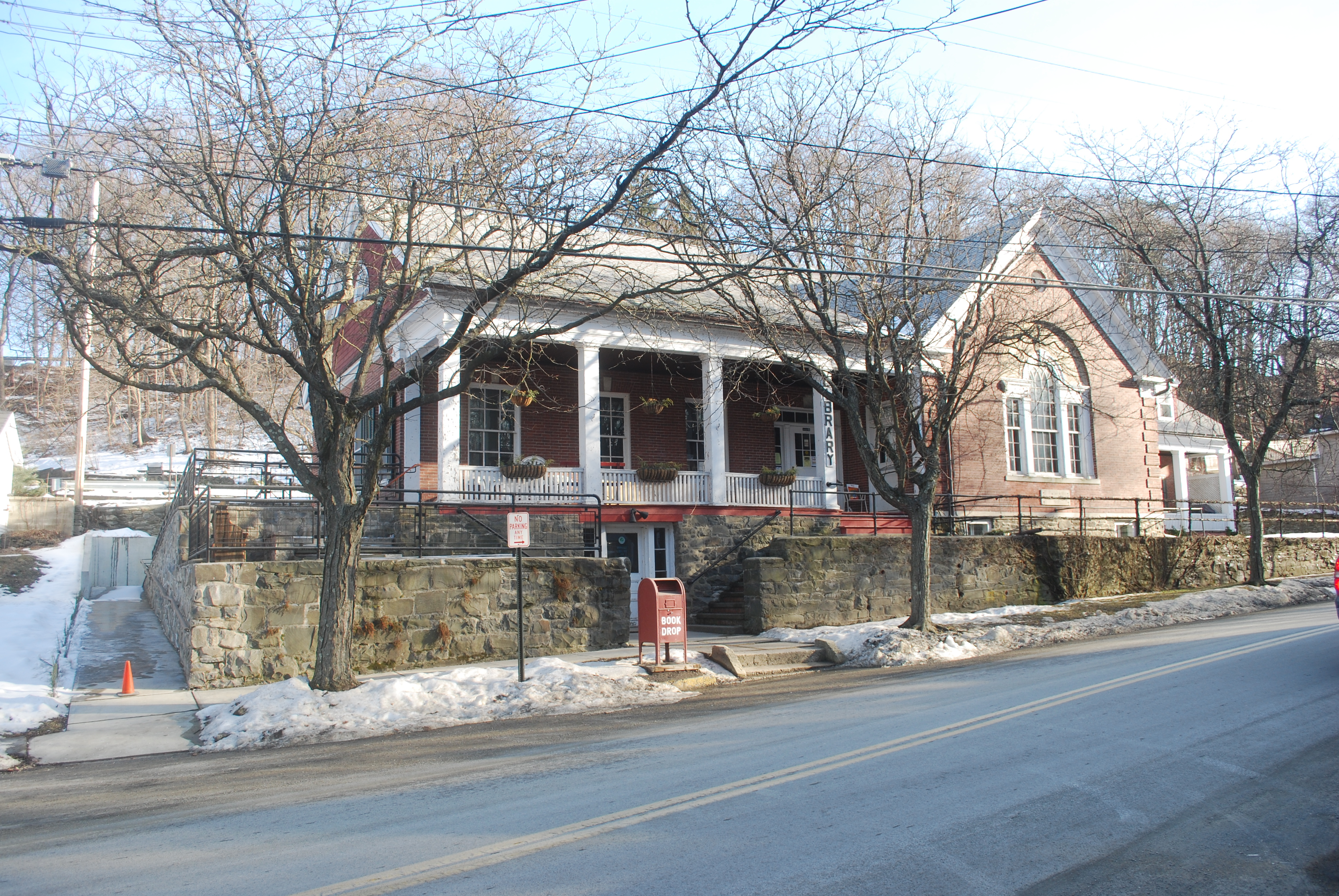
- Morton Memorial Library from the street

- Location within New York Location within the United States
- Location: Kelly St., Rhinecliff, New York
- Coordinates: 41°55′8″N 73°57′6″W
- Area: less than one acre
- Built: 1905
- Architect: Hoppin, Koen & Huntington
- Architectural style: Colonial Revival
- MPS: Rhinebeck Town MRA
- NRHP reference No.: 87001089
- Added to NRHP: July 09, 1987

The Morton Memorial Library is an historic structure along Kelly Street in the hamlet of Rhinecliff, New York, just east of the Hudson River.

== History ==
Anna L. and Levi P. Morton of the nearby Ellerslie estate, erected the Morton Memorial Library in Rhinecliff in memory of their daughter Lena. It was dedicated as a library in 1908.

== Description ==
The building, constructed in 1905, occupies most of its small village lot less than 1 acre (0.40 ha) in size. It is situated on a slight knoll facing west. The library is a one-story brick civic building designed in the Colonial Revival style. Throughout its interior, restrained oak woodwork is preserved in a variety of features including wainscoting, trim around windows and doors, and mantelpieces. It is considered an historically significant example of public architecture in Rhinecliff. In the early nineteenth century, it served as a center for education and culture within the area. It was added to the National Register of Historic Places on July 9, 1987.

== See also ==
- Mid-Hudson Library System
