= Rhinebeck and Connecticut Railroad =

Former rail line in New York state

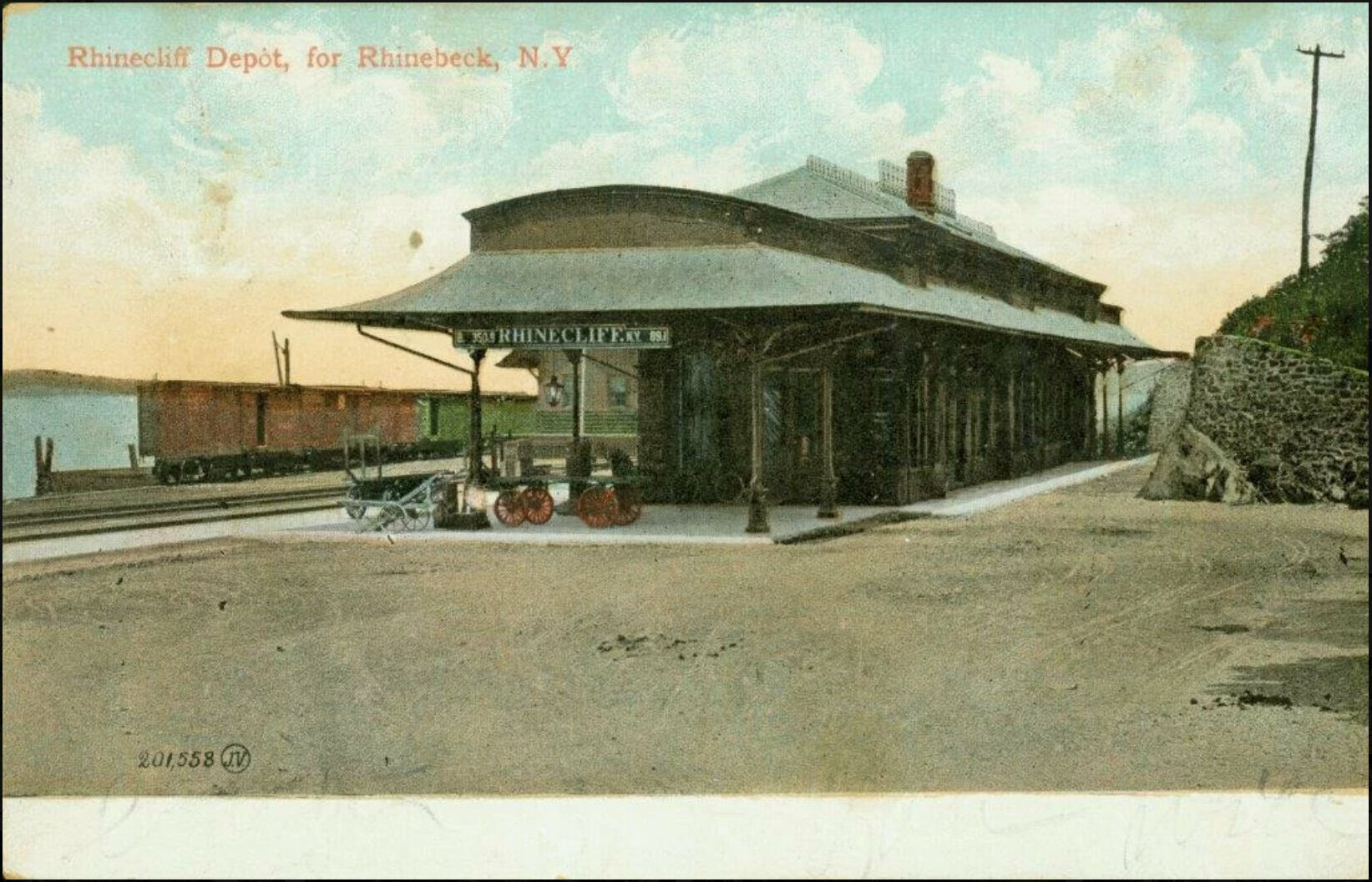
- Rhinecliff station, the western terminus of the line

Overview
- Locale: Hudson Valley, New York

History
- Opened: April 4, 1875
- Merged: June 16, 1882, into Hartford and Connecticut Western Railroad
- Closed: August 1, 1938

Technical
- Line length: 35 mi (56 km)
- Track gauge: 4 ft 8 1/2 in (1,435 mm) standard gauge

The Rhinebeck and Connecticut Railroad (R&C) was a railroad in Dutchess and Columbia counties in New York, United States. Its line ran 35 miles (56 km) east from the Hudson River at Rhinecliff to Boston Corners. It was chartered in 1870 to connect the Connecticut Western Railroad with the Hudson River to transport coal mined in Pennsylvania. Construction began in 1871, with the line opening in stages from 1873 to 1875. The railroad went bankrupt in 1881; it was purchased the next year by Connecticut Western successor Hartford and Connecticut Western Railroad (H&CW).

The Poughkeepsie Bridge and connecting railroads opened in 1889, making the eastern part of the R&C part of a mainline connecting the Pennsylvania Coal Region with New England. In the early 1890s, it was briefly part of an ambitious system assembled by Archibald Angus McLeod of the Philadelphia and Reading Railroad. McLeod's business empire collapsed in 1893; after several mergers, the H&CW (including the ex-R&C) became part of the Central New England Railway (CNE) in 1899.

The New York, New Haven and Hartford Railroad (New Haven) acquired the CNE in 1904 principally to gain control of the Poughkeepsie Bridge and Maybrook Line. Passenger service began to decline in the 1910s; it was discontinued on the eastern and western ends of the line in 1928. The eastern end of the line was abandoned in 1932. The final passenger service on the middle portion of the ex-R&C was discontinued in 1933. The entire remaining portion of the ex-R&C was abandoned in 1938 along with the rest of the CNE system.

== History ==
=== Construction and early history ===
The Rhinebeck and Connecticut Railroad (R&C) was chartered on June 29, 1870, to build a railroad from Rhinecliff on the Hudson River east to the Connecticut state line, where it would join the Connecticut Western Railroad. Its promoters also owned the Rondout and Oswego Railroad, whose president was politician and businessman Thomas Cornell. They intended to bridge the Hudson between Rondout and Rhinecliff. This would complete an all-rail route between the Great Lakes at Oswego and the port of Boston. The line was surveyed in December 1870; due to difficulties raising money, construction did not begin until October 1871, and the Hudson River bridge was never built.

Construction began at Rhinecliff and proceeded east. Freight service began on the western portion of the line in 1873 even as construction continued eastward. Construction work reached Jackson Corners that October, Mount Ross in November, Gallatinville in May 1874, and Boston Corners in November 1874. The line fully opened between Slate Dock (on the Hudson River just north of Rhinecliff) and Boston Corners on April 4, 1875. It connected to the Poughkeepsie, Hartford and Boston Railroad (PH&B) and the New York and Harlem Railroad at Boston Corners. Rather than build the remaining portion to the state line to meet the Connecticut Western, the R&C paid the PH&B some $10,000 annually (equivalent to $290,000 in 2024) for trackage rights on 6.4 miles (10.3 km) of its line between Boston Corners and State Line station (the west end of the Connecticut Western).

Passenger service on the line initially ran only as far west as Rhinebeck. In 1875, the railroad built a short extension south from Slate Dock along the east side of the Hudson River Railroad to the latter's Rhinecliff station. Passenger trains began using the extension in mid-August 1875. Later that year, the R&C built a new spur to reach Slate Dock without crossing the Hudson River Railroad at grade. It split off from the mainline north of Rhinecliff, passed over the Hudson River Railroad on a trestle, and sloped down to reach the dock.

The principal purpose of the R&C was to carry coal from the Coal Region of Northeastern Pennsylvania for destinations in Connecticut. The coal was brought to Rondout on the Delaware and Hudson Canal and transferred across the Hudson River by Cornell's fleet of tugboats. In 1875, with a virtual monopoly on the coal business in Rhinebeck, Cornell raised his price $1 per ton (equivalent to $29 in 2024) higher than other dealers on the river. Through their agent, Rhinebeck judge Conrad Marquardt, Rhinebeck merchants hired a Newburgh coal dealer. Three times in October 1875, Cornell ordered his workers to cut the lines of a competing coal barge attempting to dock at Slate Dock. He was arrested on October 31 after defying a court order; Marquardt ordered him to stand trial. The charges were dismissed in March 1876 on the grounds that Slate Dock was privately owned and the competing dealer's barge did not have the right to dock there.

The R&C had a shorter and flatter route to the Hudson than the Dutchess and Columbia Railroad, its competitor for Hudson River–Connecticut traffic, which allowed the R&C to charge lower rates. It quickly replaced the Dutchess and Columbia as the Connecticut Western's primary western connection for through traffic. By 1878, the R&C operated two daily mixed train round trips, which took about three hours to cover the 41.6 miles (66.9 km) between Rhinecliff and State Line. Sunday service was a single round trip that ran only between Rhinecliff and Ancram.

=== Mergers ===
Even with the through traffic, the R&C soon had financial troubles. It entered foreclosure in July 1881. Cornell purchased the railroad at auction that November for just $100,000 (equivalent to $3.3 million in 2024) – less than the scrap value of the line. The following February, the Hartford and Connecticut Western Railroad (H&CW), reorganized from the Connecticut Western in 1881, reached an agreement to purchase the R&C from Cornell. The purchase took place on May 25, 1882, for $800,000 (equivalent to $26.1 million in 2024) in stock. It was approved by the state legislature on June 8, and the R&C was transferred to the H&CW on June 16, 1882.

The HC&W found the trackage rights over the PH&B to be less than ideal, as H&CW trains were at the mercy of the PH&B dispatcher. In March 1883, the H&CW began routing its trains over the Newburgh, Dutchess and Connecticut Railroad from State Line to Millerton, and the New York and Harlem from Millerton to Boston Corners, to avoid the PH&B. This quickly resulted in better treatment for the HC&W trains. On January 26, 1884, the HC&W purchased the disputed section of track from the bankrupt PH&B. The purchase was effective April 1, 1884.

The Poughkeepsie Bridge was built in the late 1880s. During its construction, a syndicate associated with the Philadelphia and Reading Railroad (P&R) assembled a system of railroads connecting to the bridge. In 1887, they acquired control of the H&CW to serve as the system's entry to Connecticut. They intended to acquire the PH&B to link the bridge with the HC&W, but the owners of the PH&B planned to extend their railroad and refused to sell. The syndicate instead chartered the Poughkeepsie and Connecticut Railroad (P&C) in September 1888. It paralleled the PH&B northeast from Poughkeepsie, meeting the former R&C at Silvernails.

The bridge was completed in December 1888. On July 23, 1889, the P&C and the Hudson Connecting Railroad were merged into the Central New England and Western Railroad (CNE&W). The P&C line opened six days later. In August 1889, the CNE&W leased the H&CW, creating a mainline running from Campbell Hall, New York, to Hartford, Connecticut. The eastern part of the former R&C was integrated into this mainline, while the western section became a branch line. Along with local service, several intercity trains on the Boston–Washington "Poughkeepsie Bridge Route" used the line between 1890 and 1893.

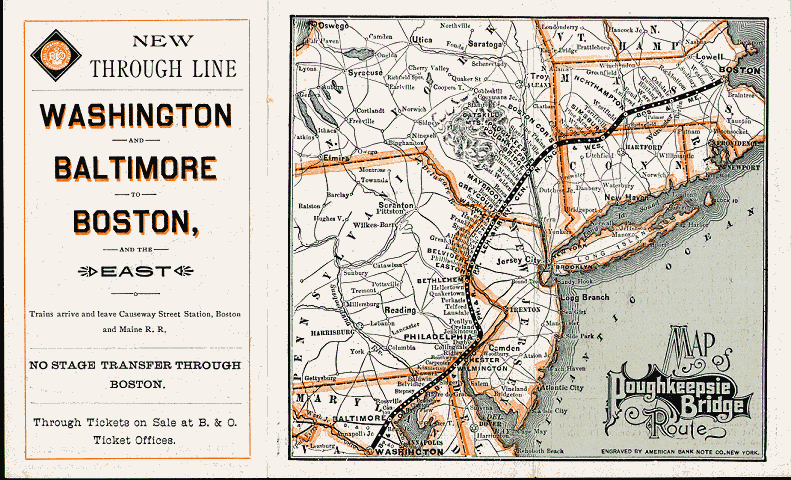
1890s ad for the Poughkeepsie Bridge Route, which used part of the ex-R&C

In 1890, P&R president Archibald Angus McLeod began an ambitious attempt to obtain control of the railroads that distributed the P&R's anthracite coal into New England. He obtained control of the Pennsylvania, Poughkeepsie and Boston Railroad, which connected with the CNE&W at Campbell Hall, in 1891. The following January, the P&R purchased the Delaware and New England Railway, a paper railroad that controlled the CNE&W and the Poughkeepsie Bridge. On August 1, 1892, McLeod consolidated the two properties into the Philadelphia, Reading and New England Railroad. That year, the P&R also obtained stock control of the New York and New England Railroad and the Boston and Maine Railroad, placing the former R&C as a crucial link in a railroad empire stretching from the Pennsylvania coal fields to northern New England.

=== Central New England Railway era ===
McLeod's feat was short-lived; with little actual capital to back the purchases, the lines successively fell into bankruptcy. The CNE&W defaulted in May 1893 and was placed in receivership that August. It was sold in October 1898, with New Haven steamboat tycoon Chester W. Chapin the controlling interest, and reorganized as the Central New England Railway (CNE) on January 23, 1899. The CNE struggled financially for five years until the New Haven obtained control in early 1904. The New Haven's sole interest in the CNE was the Poughkeepsie Bridge as a freight route to the west; much of the CNE system was redundant to the New Haven's north–south lines. Except for assigning itself control of the bridge and the connecting Maybrook Line, the New Haven largely kept the CNE as an independent railroad despite its total stock control.

By 1905, CNE service over the former Rhinebeck and Connecticut consisted of a daily Hartford–Campbell Hall round trip and two daily State Line–Rhinecliff round trips. In 1907, the CNE was merged with several nearby railroads including the Poughkeepsie and Eastern Railroad (P&E, successor to the PH&B) and the Newburgh, Dutchess and Connecticut Railroad (successor to the Dutchess and Columbia). The P&E became the mainline for the CNE; the entire ex-R&C became the Rhinecliff branch. The 1875-built freight trestle at Rhinecliff was removed around 1910. By 1912, only two daily round trips used the former R&C east of Silvernails; the western part of the line had two daily Silvernails–Rhinecliff round trips. Service was similar in 1915; by 1920, Rhinecliff service was reduced to a single daily mixed train round trip. Freight traffic on the CNE increased sharply during World War I, as it was used as a bypass of the congested lines to the south, but the railroad's fortunes declined thereafter.

The CNE was finally merged into the New Haven in 1927. The New Haven terminated passenger service on the CNE system in Connecticut in late 1927; passenger service between Silvernails and Rhinecliff ended the next year. Passenger and freight service between Copake and State Line ended on April 28, 1928. The New Haven applied for abandonment of that section in June 1932; the Interstate Commerce Commission approved it that August. This was the last connection between the Connecticut portion of the ex-CNE and the Poughkeepsie Bridge; its abandonment left the ex-CNE as a set of disconnected branchlines.

The final passenger service on the ex-R&C – a gasoline-powered railcar operating a single daily round trip between Poughkeepsie and Copake via Silvernails – ended on September 9, 1933. Freight service continued between Rhinecliff and Copake with around two round trips per week. In April 1938, the Interstate Commerce Commission allowed the New Haven to abandon most of the remaining ex-CNE lines in New York. This included the remaining portion of the former R&C between Rhinecliff and Copake. Abandonment of the long-unprofitable lines took place on August 1, 1938. The tracks were removed the next year.

== Route ==
Map of Central New England Railway lines in the Upper Hudson Valley, with the Rhinebeck and Connecticut Railroad in yellow ( )

The Rhinebeck and Connecticut Railroad ran about 35.0 miles (56.3 km) across northern Dutchess County and southern Columbia County, New York, from the Hudson River to near the northwest corner of Connecticut. Its southwest end was at Rhinecliff station in Rhinebeck, where it connected to the Hudson River Railroad. It ran northeast from Rhinecliff to Elizaville, then followed the Roeliff Jansen Kill southeast to Silvernails, the junction (after 1889) with the Poughkeepsie and Connecticut Railroad. The line continued northeast along the Roeliff Jansen Kill valley to Copake, where it turned southeast to reach the Poughkeepsie and Eastern Railway (P&E) and the New York and Harlem Railroad at Boston Corners. From there, it used trackage rights on the P&E to reach State Line near Millerton.

Except for a short section between Ancram and Copake, the Rhinebeck and Connecticut was completely uphill from Rhinecliff to Boston Corners. The maximum grade was just over 1%, and maximum elevation 800 feet (240 m) above sea level (from the minimal elevation of the Hudson) – both substantially flatter than the competing Newburgh, Dutchess and Connecticut Railroad. Helper locomotives, which were used on the Connecticut portion of the Central New England, were not needed on the Rhinebeck and Connecticut.

=== Station listing ===
Miles (km)	Municipality	Station	Connections and notes
0.0 (0.0)	Rhinebeck	Rhinecliff	Junction with Hudson River Railroad
3.0 (4.8)	Rhinebeck	Rhinebeck	
7.4 (12.0)	Red Hook	Red Hook	
9.1 (14.7)	Red Hook	Fraleighs	
11.3 (18.1)	Red Hook	Cokertown	
13.6 (21.8)	Clermont	Elizaville	
17.8 (28.6)	Milan	Jackson Corners	
19.3 (31.1)	Pine Plains	Mount Ross	
21.4 (34.4)	Gallatin	Silvernails	Junction with Poughkeepsie and Connecticut Railroad
23.0 (37.0)	Gallatin	Gallatinville	
25.4 (40.9)	Ancram	Ancram	
28.5 (45.9)	Ancram	Cooks	
31.5 (50.6)	Copake	Copake	
35.0 (56.4)	Ancram	Boston Corners	Junction with Poughkeepsie and Eastern Railway and New York and Harlem Railroad
