= Mount Riga station =

Railroad station in North East, New York, US

Mount Riga
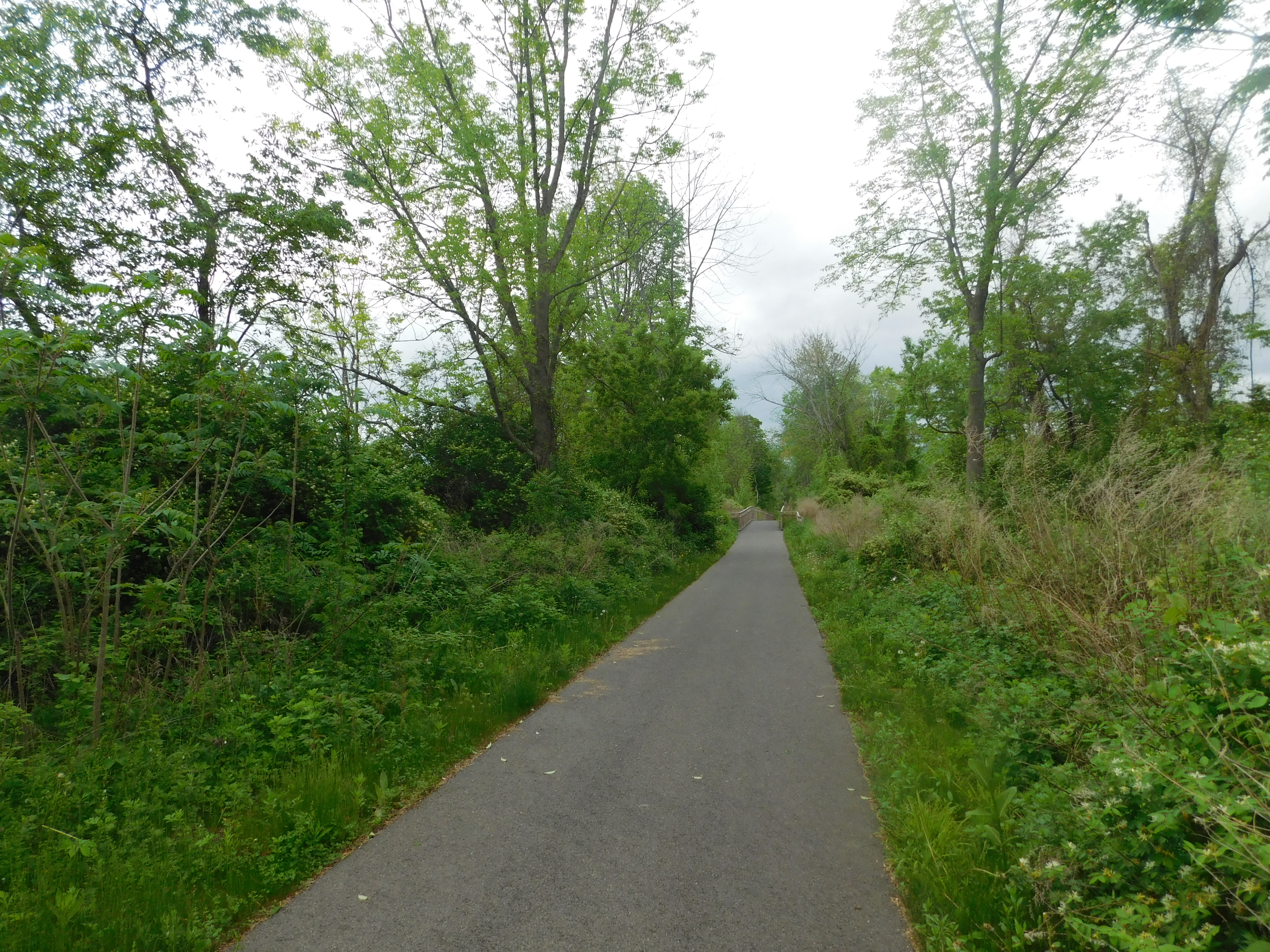
- The Harlem Valley Rail Trail at the approximate site of the Mount Riga station in May 2025.

General information
- Location: Mount Riga Station Road near County Route 62 (Rudd Pond Road); Millerton, New York
- Coordinates: 41.99667°N 73.51651°W

History
- Opened: before 1885

Key dates
- January 1931: Station agent eliminated

Former services
Preceding station	New York Central Railroad	Following station
Millerton toward New York	Harlem Division	Boston Corners toward Chatham
Location

The Mount Riga station was a former New York Central Railroad station in North East, New York. The station also served nearby Ancram, New York.

== History ==
The New York and Harlem Railroad built their main line through Ancram between 1848 and 1852.

The station was located at milepost 95.81, receiving service from not only the New York Central Railroad, but also the Central New England Railway. The station was an island platform with each railroad company serving respectively on each side. Just 1 3/4 miles west of the Mount Riga station was a point referred to as "The Summit" by railroad staff. At milepost 97.58 it had an elevation of 775.90 feet (236.49 m) above sea level, making it the highest point along the Harlem Division.

By 1938, the former Central New England tracks had been abandoned and removed by successor New York, New Haven & Hartford Railroad. Passenger service continued as before on the NYC Harlem Division until successor Penn Central abruptly ended all passenger service north of Dover Plains on March 20, 1972, the station was closed for passengers. Freight service continued until 1976, and the rails were removed in 1981.
