= Boston Corners station =

Boston Corners
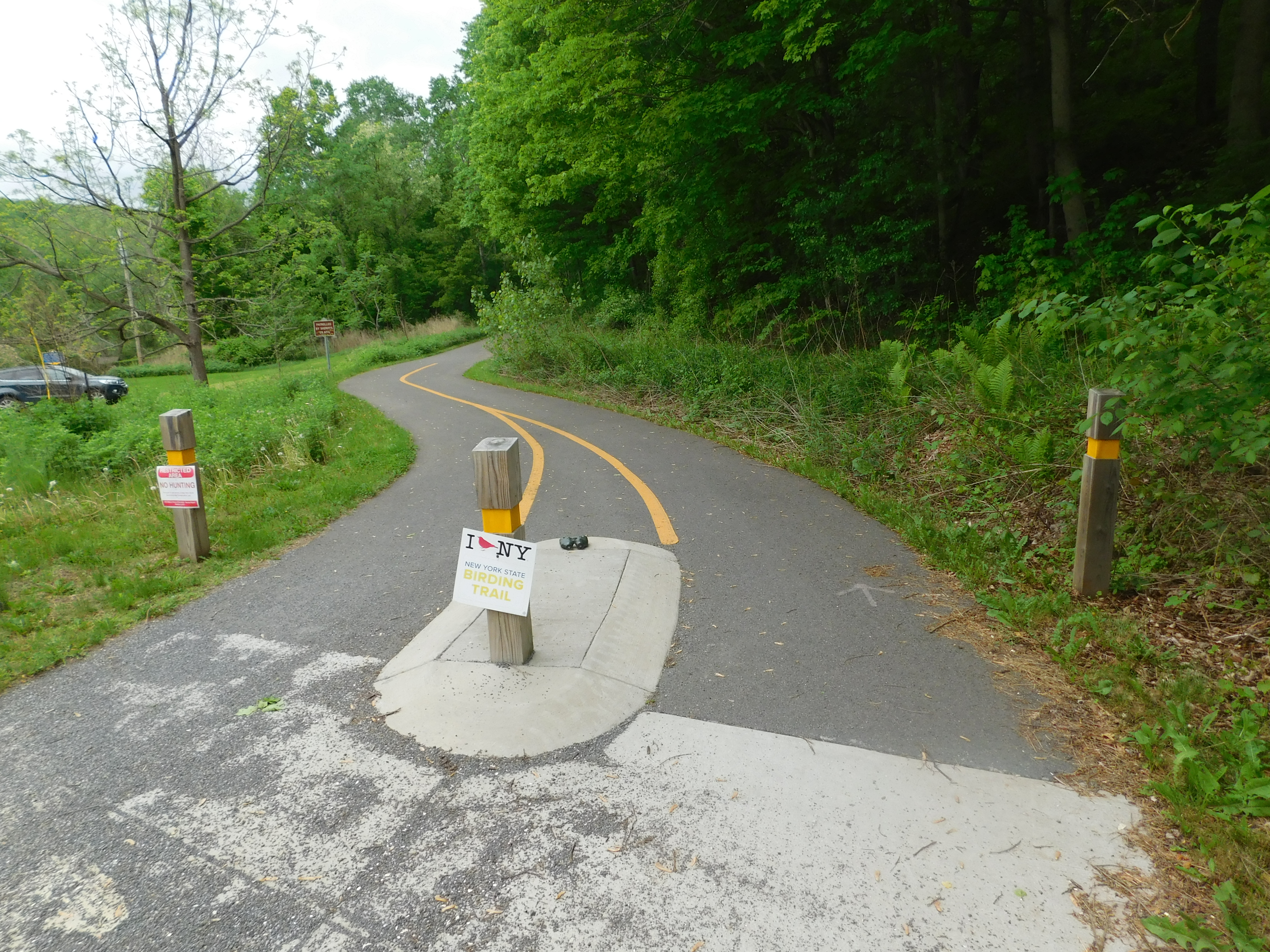
- Boston Corners station site in May 2025 after construction of the Harlem Valley Rail Trail.

General information
- Location: 45 Boston Corners Road; Millerton, New York
- Coordinates: 42.05237°N 73.52039°W

History
- Opened: May 10, 1852
- Closed: May 1959

Former services
Preceding station	New York Central Railroad	Following station
Mount Riga toward New York	Harlem Division	Copake Falls toward Chatham
Location

The Boston Corners station was a former New York Central Railroad station that served the residents of Ancram, New York.

== History ==
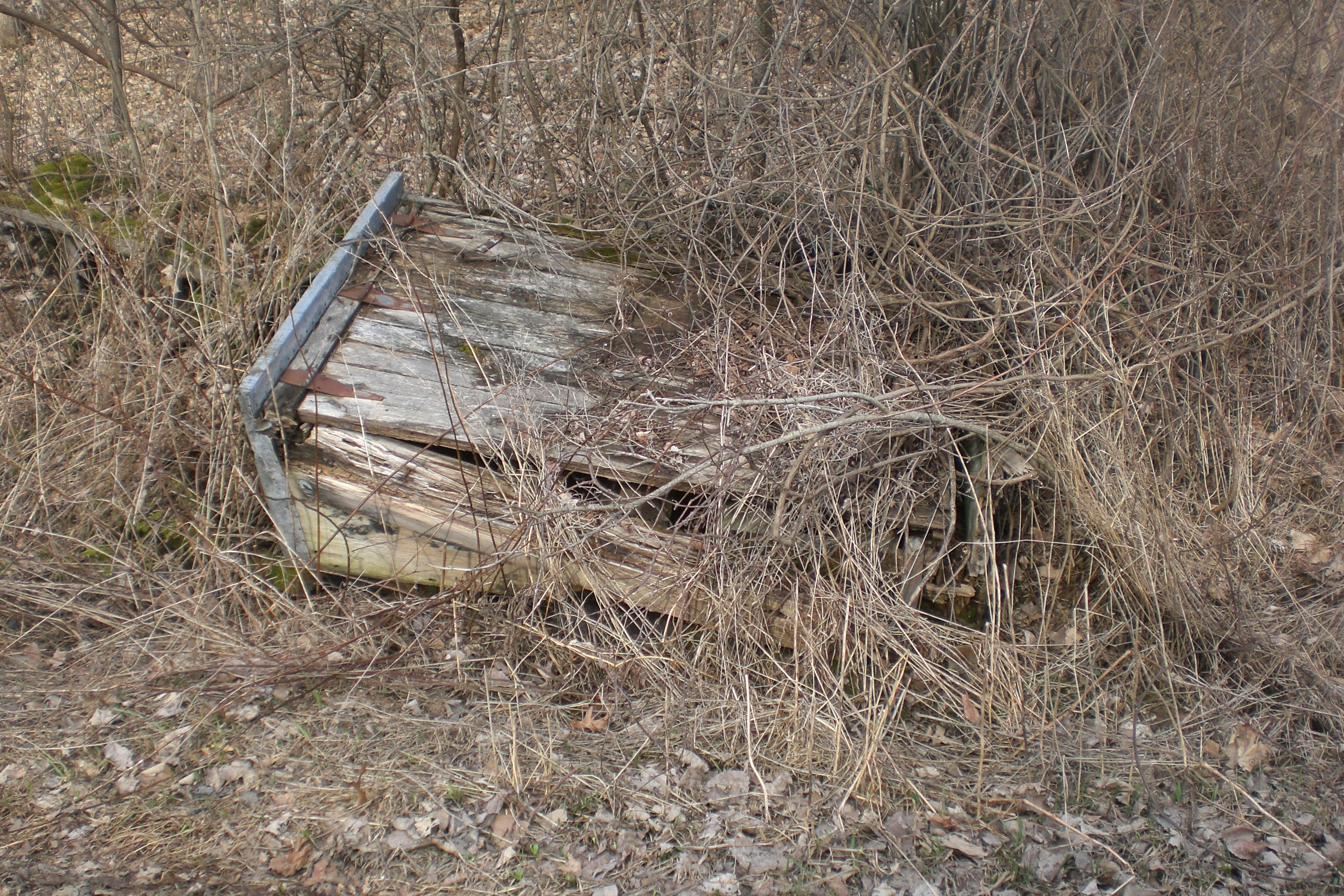
A former station signal box lied across former track bed in 2009

Boston Corners was the first stop of the New York and Harlem Railroad in Columbia County, between Dover Plains (to the south) and the end of the line at Chatham (to the north), and was constructed between 1848 and 1852. The site was originally known as "Boston Corner" which was located at the time in the very Southwest corner of Massachusetts. However, on January 3, 1855 the United States Congress annexed 1,000 acres (4.0 km^{2}) from Massachusetts to New York. This now situated about 400 feet (120 m) of the NY&H in New York State. In the early days of the development the area was known as "the Badlands" which was a spot where numerous fugitives would engage in illegal activities such as boxing and prize fights. The railroad was acquired by the New York Central and Hudson River Railroad in 1864, and converted it into the Harlem Division. By the early 1870s the station also began to serve the Poughkeepsie and Eastern Railway and the Rhinebeck and Connecticut Railroad, both of which were eventually acquired by the Central New England Railway. The CNE abandoned the P&E in 1925, and then the R&C in 1938.

Service on the Harlem at Boston Corners was reduced many times in the 20th century, and in 1940 it was reduced to a flag stop. On September 28, 1952 the station was closed by New York Central, remained for a few years and was dismantled a few years later. Passenger service continued until March 20, 1972. Freight continued running on the line until service north of Wassaic ceased on March 27, 1976. The rails were lifted in 1981 by Conrail.
