= Newburgh, Dutchess and Connecticut Railroad =

Railway line in New York, US

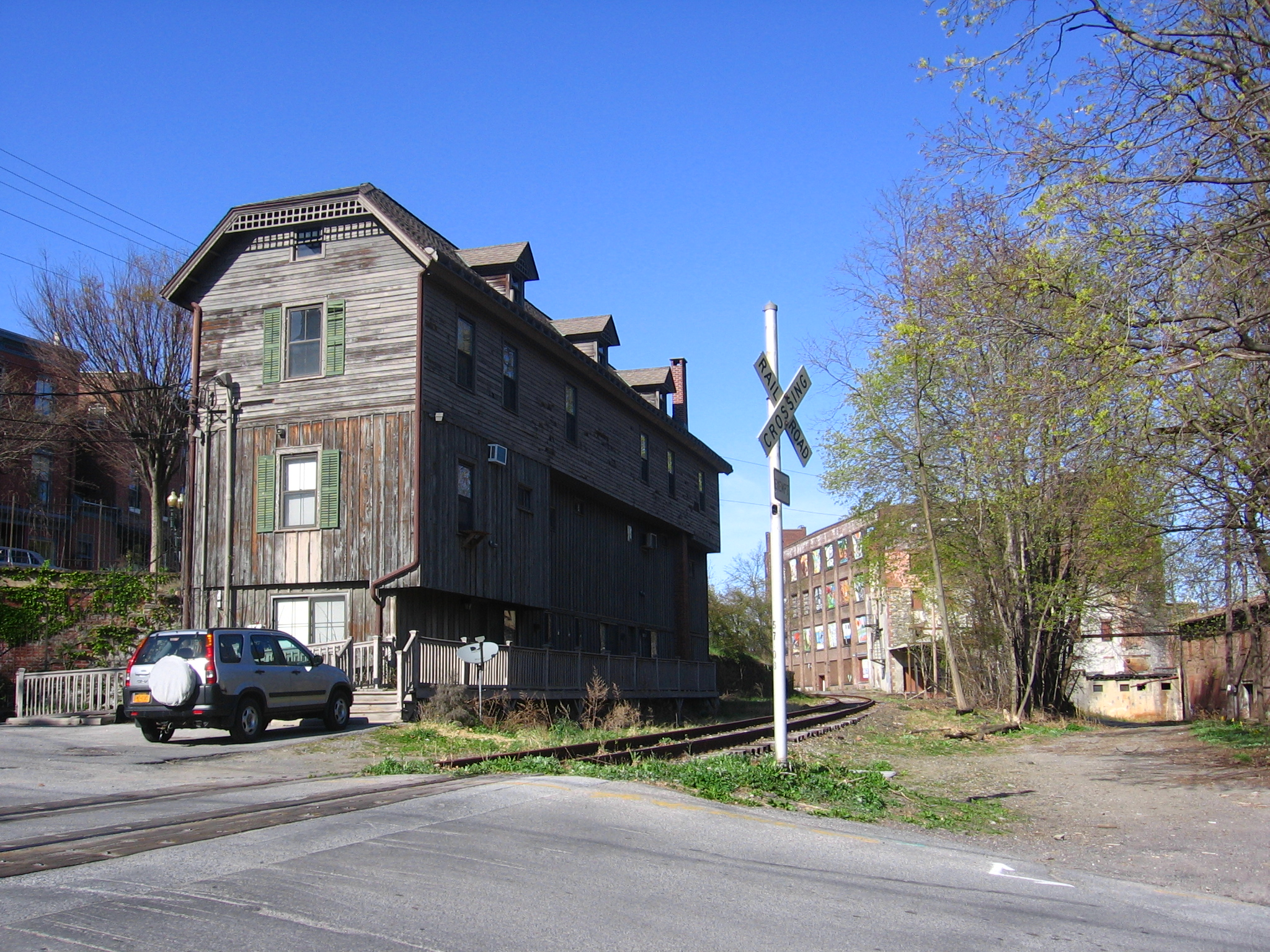
- The former company headquarters at Matteawan in 2012

Overview
- Locale: Dutchess County, New York

History
- Opened: July 21, 1869 as Dutchess and Columbia Railroad
- Completed: July 24, 1871
- Reorganized: January 15, 1877 as Newburgh, Dutchess and Connecticut Railroad
- Merged: 1907 into Central New England Railway
- Closed: August 1, 1938 (one portion still operated by Metro-North Railroad)

Technical
- Line length: 58.9 mi (94.8 km)
- Track gauge: 4 ft 8 1/2 in (1,435 mm) standard gauge

The Newburgh, Dutchess and Connecticut Railroad was a railroad in Dutchess County, New York, United States. Its line ran 58.9 miles (94.8 km) northeast from the Hudson River in Fishkill to the Connecticut state line near Millerton. The Dutchess and Columbia Railroad (D&C), was chartered in 1866 to link rural villages with the Hudson River Railroad and New York and Harlem Railroad. The under-construction line was leased by the Boston, Hartford and Erie Railroad (BH&E) in 1868. The first segment opened in July 1869, and it reached Pine Plains the following February.

The BH&E failed in March 1870, and the D&C officers took back the railroad in an overnight escapade. The final segment to the state line opened in 1871. In the mid-1870s, the railroad became part of the New York, Boston and Montreal Railway. That railroad's failure resulted in the D&C being sold at foreclosure in August 1876. It was reorganized in January 1877 as the Newburgh, Dutchess and Connecticut Railroad (ND&C). In 1881, BH&E successor New York and New England Railroad (NY&NE) began using the southwestern portion of the ND&C. It built a short new branch to reach Fishkill Landing on the Hudson River. The connecting Clove Branch Railroad, built in 1869 and extended in 1877, was closed in 1897.

The ND&C was bought by the New York, New Haven and Hartford Railroad (NYNH&H) in 1905. It was assigned to NYNH&H subsidiary Central New England Railway in 1907. Passenger service ended on parts of the line in 1921 and 1925, and on the rest of the line in 1933. Most of the former ND&C was abandoned in sections between 1925 and 1938. The remaining section between Beacon and Hopewell Junction was retained for freight use. After passing through several owners, it is now part of the Beacon Line, used by Metro-North Railroad for equipment transfers.

== History ==
=== Beginnings ===
The Dutchess and Columbia Railroad (D&C) was chartered September 4, 1866. It was to run from Plumb Point in Fishkill northeast to meet the New York and Harlem Railroad at Hillsdale station in Craryville. Despite the connection with the Harlem, it was not intended to be a bridge line; instead, it was expected to carry lead and iron ore from the Ancram area westbound, and coal from the Coal Region of Pennsylvania eastbound. Columbia County townships proved reluctant to fund the northern portion of the line, so it was rerouted eastward from Pine Plains to meet the Harlem at Millerton. This missed most of the Ancram mines, but would allow connection with the Connecticut Western Railroad then building west from Hartford, Connecticut – thus making the railroad a bridge line after all. Construction began from Plumb Point in 1868.

In November 1868, the D&C was leased by the Boston, Hartford and Erie Railroad (BH&E). (Note: In the years shortly after the American Civil War, this was a common arrangement: a railroad contemplating building an extension, but reluctant to finance construction itself, would lease another railroad, even an unbuilt one. Some railroads were chartered for the purpose of being leased. The leased line was frequently operated as if it was an integral part of the "parent" company.) The BH&E had completed lines from Waterbury, Connecticut, to Boston and Providence by 1855, but had struggled building through the hills of western Connecticut. Intending to bypass New York City and compete with the New York, New Haven and Hartford Railroad (New Haven) for New England business, the Erie Railroad (which controlled the BH&E) planned to ship coal across the Hudson River from Newburgh. The BH&E constructed a steamship terminal at Denning's Point at the mouth of Fishkill Creek and built a trestle from the D&C to the point.

Service began on the D&C line between Dutchess Junction (Plumb Point) and Hopewell Junction (the planned junction with the BH&E) on June 21, 1869. The BH&E supplied all rolling stock for the line. For a short time before the Dutchess Junction station was completed, trains ran over the Hudson River Railroad between Fishkill Landing and Dutchess Junction. Later in 1869, the associated Clove Branch Railroad opened its 4.25-mile (6.84 km) line from Clove Branch Junction (north of Hopewell Junction) to the mines at Sylvan Lake. The D&C line reached Millbrook by October 1869 and Pine Plains in February 1870.

=== Expansion ===
The overextended BH&E failed in March 1870. Rather than submit to the receivers appointed for the BH&E, the D&C officers decided to take back their railroad. In the early morning hours of March 22, the president and secretary led what a local historical society later called a "dramatic midnight train run". Beginning at Pine Plains, they tore up tracks at the engine house, woke up a conductor to operate a train, and took possession of the stations along the line. Regular service on the line resumed by March 25 using a purchased locomotive and coaches rented from the Hudson River Railroad. After a multiple-month court battle, the BH&E abandoned its claim to the line.

The D&C extended its line through Millerton, meeting the Connecticut Western at the state line on July 24, 1871. Through service began soon after. Millerton became the connection point between the two railroads; the Connecticut Western leased the D&C between State Line and Millerton later in 1871. The Poughkeepsie and Eastern Railroad (P&E) opened from Poughkeepsie, New York to a junction with the D&C at Stissing on January 24, 1871. It opened a second section of its line from Pine Plains to State Line on October 1, 1872. Between Stissing Junction and Pine Plains, it used trackage rights on the D&C.

In 1870, the Harlem Extension Railroad was formed by a merger of the Lebanon Springs Railroad and the Bennington and Rutland Railroad, forming a Chatham, New York–Rutland, Vermont line. Late in 1872, the D&C was merged with the New York and Boston Railroad, the unbuilt Putnam and Dutchess Railroad, and the Clove Branch to form the New York, Boston and Northern Railway. In 1873, it joined with the Harlem Extension and the unbuilt Pine Plains and Albany Railroad to form the New York, Boston and Montreal Railway (NYB&M). The Clove Branch and the D&C between Clove Branch Junction and Pine Plains were to become part of its New York–Rutland mainline.

=== Newburgh, Dutchess and Connecticut ===
The Rhinebeck and Connecticut Railroad opened in 1875 with a shorter and flatter route to the Hudson than the D&C, which allowed it to charge lower rates. The Rhinebeck and Connecticut replaced the D&C as the C&W's primary western connection for through traffic, hurting revenues of the D&C. The Panic of 1873 stopped the construction of the two new segments by 1875; the NYB&M went bankrupt, followed by the D&C. The Clove Branch again became independent. The D&C was sold at foreclosure in August 1876. It was reorganized January 15, 1877, as the Newburgh, Dutchess and Connecticut Railroad. Company headquarters were at Matteawan. In 1877, the Clove Branch was extended by 4.01 miles (6.45 km) to Clove Valley, where an iron works was located. The extension was partially built on right-of-way that had been graded for the NYB&M.

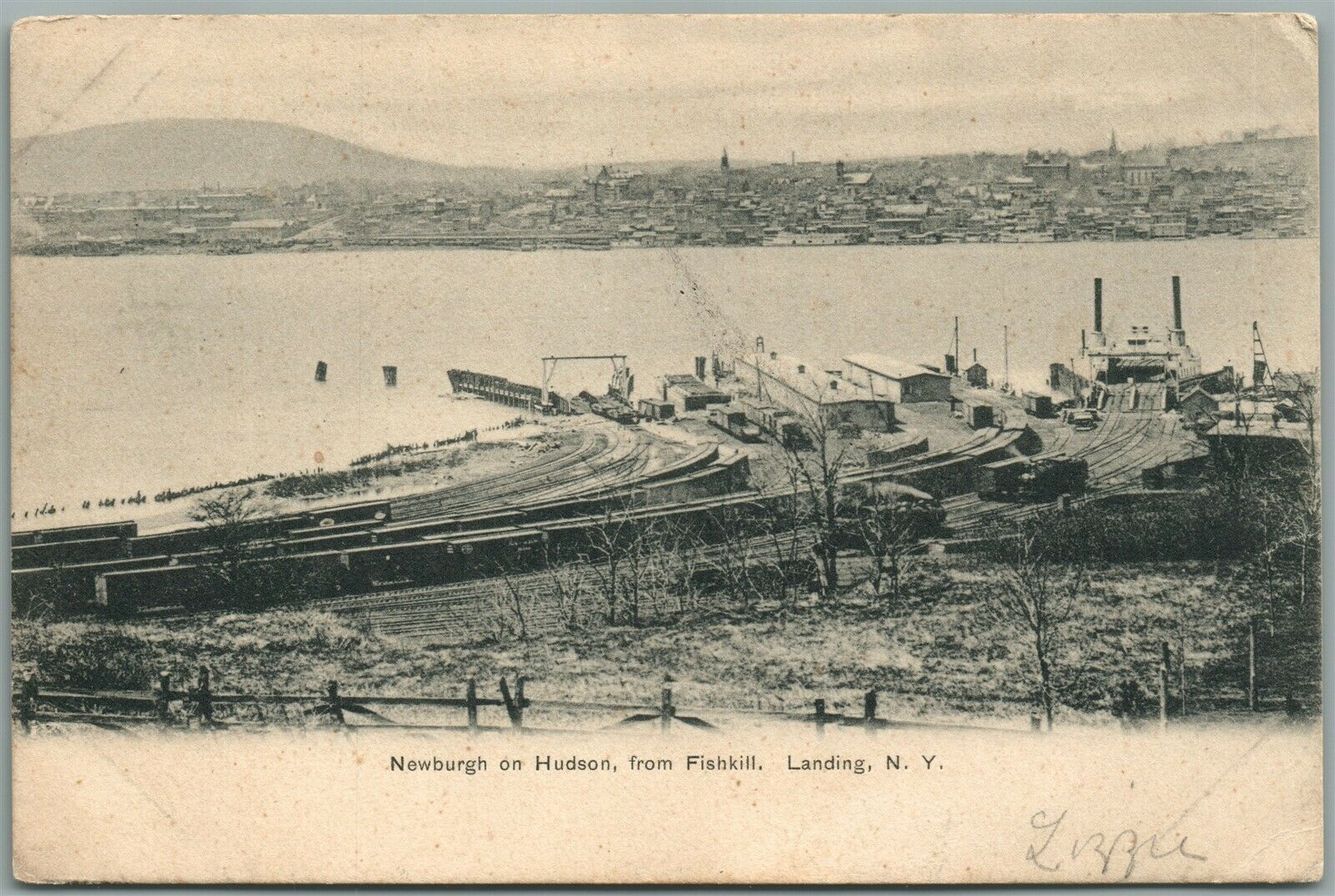
Fishkill Landing in the early 20th century

The New York and New England Railroad (NY&NE), successor to the BH&E, opened its extension from Danbury, Connecticut to Brewster, New York in July 1881. That December, the NY&NE opened a further extension to Hopewell Junction. As had been planned in 1868, the ND&C was used to reach the Hudson, albeit with trackage rights rather than ownership. The NY&NE built a short branch from the ND&C to reach Fishkill Landing. Passenger service between Fishkill Landing and Boston began on December 12, 1881. Train ferry service across the Hudson, connecting with the Erie Railroad, also began that day; the first freight car carried 800 turkeys from Livonia, New York, bound for Providence. Within weeks, the NY&NE was carrying more freight than all other railroads in Dutchess County combined.

The Poughkeepsie Bridge opened in 1889, along with connecting lines west to the Erie Railroad and northeast to Silvernails, as part of the Central New England and Western (successor of the Connecticut Western). The Dutchess County Railroad from the bridge to Hopewell Junction was completed in 1892. These through lines vastly decreased the demand for the ferry at Fishkill Landing. The ND&C thereafter handled primarily local traffic; much of its income was local coal delivery within Dutchess County. The NY&NE fell under control of its archrival New Haven in 1895 and was merged into it in 1899. The Clove Branch, leased by the ND&C, ended service in 1897 as the iron mines ran out and was torn up in 1898.

=== Central New England Railway ===
The Central New England and Western was consolidated with the Poughkeepsie Bridge and Railroad Company in 1892 as the Philadelphia, Reading and New England Railroad, under control of the Philadelphia and Reading Railroad. It was succeeded in 1899 by the Central New England Railway (CNE), still controlled by the Reading. The New Haven obtained control of the CNE in 1904, primarily to obtain the Poughkeepsie Bridge. Although subsidiary to the New Haven, the CNE operated largely independently. The New Haven also transferred the ex-NY&NE Fishkill Landing branch to the CNE.

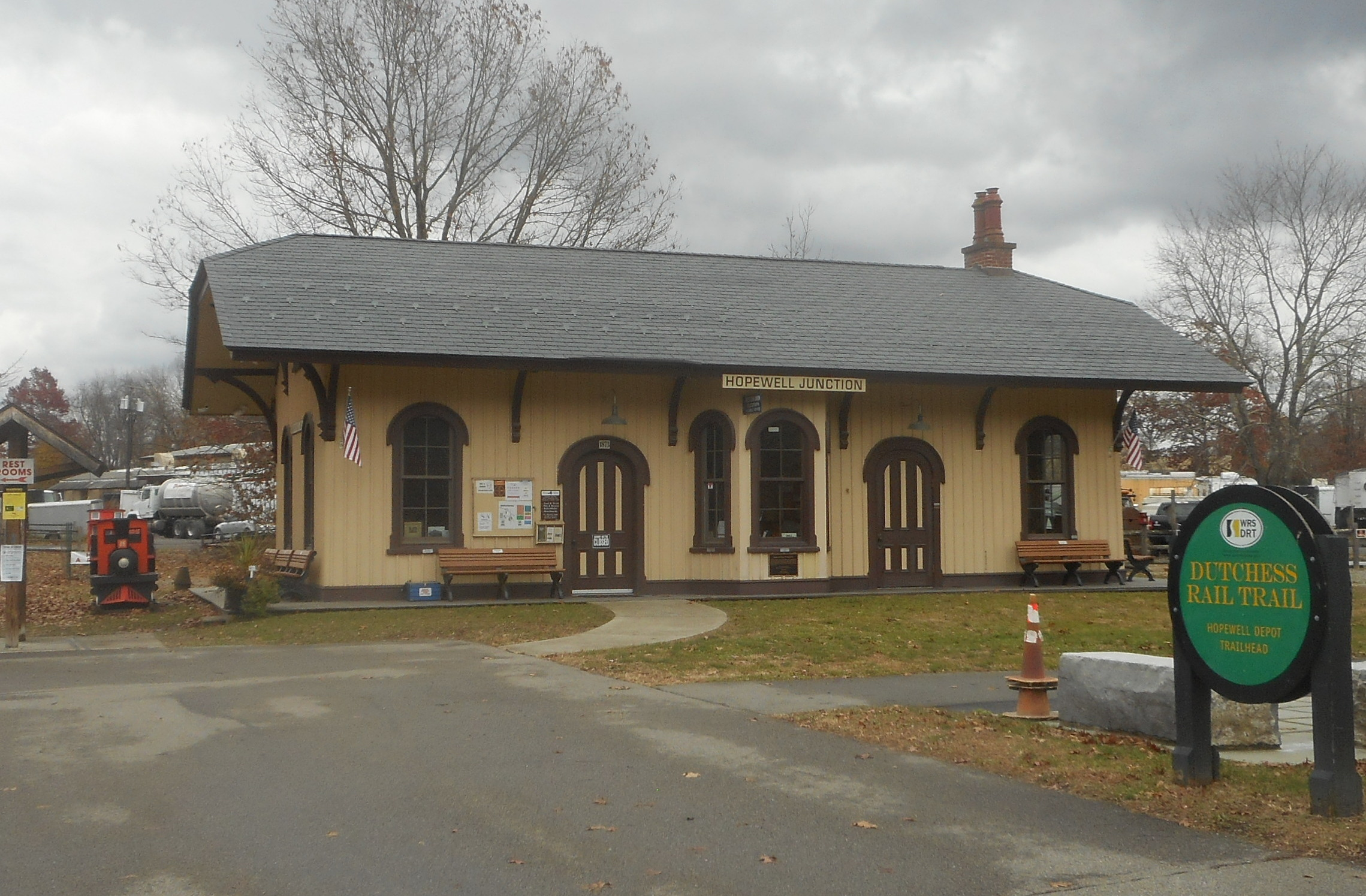
Hopewell Junction station, the former crossing of the ND&C and the Maybrook Line

By 1905, daily passenger service on the ND&C included two Fishkill Landing–Pine Plains round trips and two Fishkill Landing–Millerton round trips, plus a Millerton–State Line round trip connecting with a CNE train. The New Haven agreed in July 1905 to purchase the ND&C – primarily to obtain control of the segment between Wicopee Junction and Hopewell Junction, and to prevent the New York Central Railroad from obtaining the line. The transfer took place on September 14, 1905, after which the ND&C was operated as part of the CNE. Some service was rerouted to Poughkeepsie rather than Fishkill Junction. The ND&C, the Poughkeepsie and Eastern, the Dutchess County, and the Poughkeepsie Bridge were formally merged into the CNE in 1907.

The CNE soon began to consolidate its duplicative lines crossing rural Dutchess County. On October 2, 1909, the railroad abandoned the former Poughkeepsie and Connecticut Railroad between West Pine Plains and West Salt Point. Trains were rerouted over the parallel ex-Poughkeepsie and Eastern, including the portion of the ex-ND&C between Pine Plains and Stissing Junction. By 1912, the line had two daily Fishkill Landing–Millerton round trips and one daily Fishkill Landing–Pine Plains round trip, all operating via Dutchess Junction. Two daily round trips on the ex-NY&NE used the line between Fishkill Landing and Hopewell Junction; three daily CNE round trips used the line only between Stissing Junction and Pine Plains.

By 1915, the line had 1 1/2 daily Beacon (formerly Fishkill Landing)–Pine Plains round trips, a daily southbound trip from Pine Plains to Hopewell Junction, and one daily Beacon–Millerton round trip. One daily CNE round trip used the line between Millerton and Stissing Junction, and two between Pine Plains and Stissing Junction; two daily ex-NY&NE round trips used the line west of Hopewell Junction. The 1.03 miles (1.66 km) between Wicopee Junction and Dutchess Junction was abandoned in 1916, leaving only the connection to Beacon (formerly Fishkill Landing) at its south end.

=== Abandonment ===
The CNE ended passenger service between Shekomeko and Millerton on December 18, 1921. That 7.73-mile (12.44 km) section of track was generally disused for freight until January 21, 1925, when the Interstate Commerce Commission authorized abandonment. Passenger service between Millerton and Pine Plains via Boston Corners (using the ex-ND&C between Millerton and State Line) also ended at that time. The CNE began using a gasoline railcar between Beacon and Pine Plains in October 1923. The single daily round trip between Pine Plains and Shekomeko was discontinued in 1927. The final service east of Millerton on the ex-ND&C was cut back to Canaan, Connecticut in December 1927, shortly before all CNE passenger service ended in Connecticut.

The CNE was merged into the New Haven in 1927. By 1932, the only remaining passenger service on the ex-CNE was operated by a single gasoline railcar: one Beacon–Pine Plains round trip on the ex-ND&C, plus one Poughkeepsie–Copake round trip that used the line between Pine Plains and Stissing Junction. These trips were discontinued on September 9, 1933. The 5.1 miles (8.2 km) between Pine Plains and Shekomeko was abandoned in late 1935. On July 1, 1936, the New Haven discontinued freight service between Stissing Junction and Millbrook because two trestles were in poor condition.

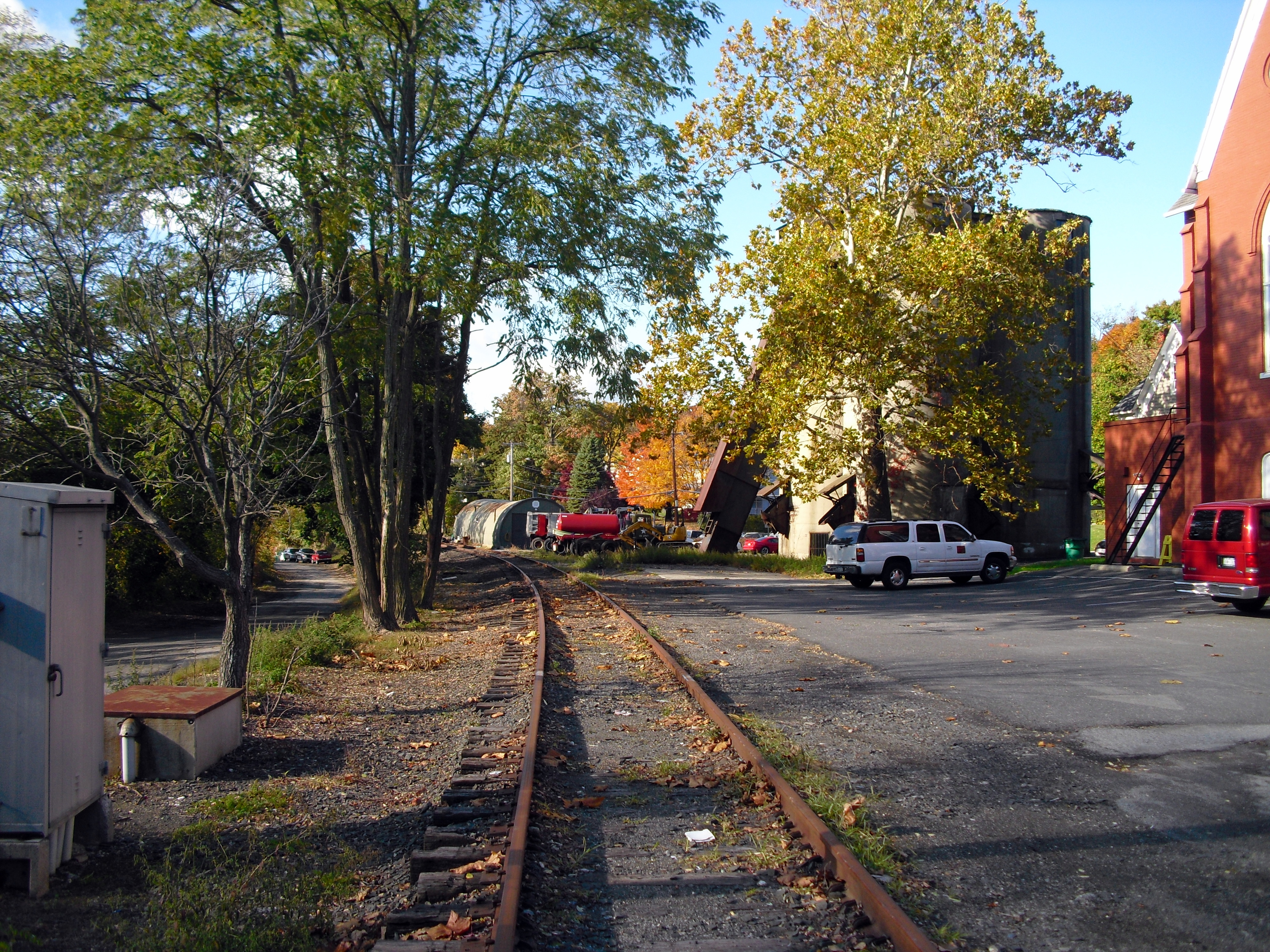
The Beacon Line in the Matteawan section of Beacon in 2010

In April 1938, the Interstate Commerce Commission allowed the New Haven to abandon most of the remaining ex-CNE lines in New York. This included the former ND&C between Hopewell Junction and Pine Plains. Abandonment of the long-unprofitable lines took place on August 1, 1938. The New Haven continued operating the Maybrook Line as a major freight route over the Poughkeepsie Bridge. The Beacon–Hopewell Junction portion of the ex-ND&C was also retained for freight service.

The New Haven was merged into Penn Central in 1969, which in turn merged into Conrail in 1976. The Poughkeepsie Bridge was damaged by fire in 1974, cutting off the Maybrook Line from west-of-Hudson connections. This left the ex-ND&C spur to Beacon as the only western connection for the line; Conrail soon upgraded it to handle additional freight traffic. However, in 1981, Conrail applied to abandon the segment along with the Maybrook Line between Poughkeepsie and Hopewell Junction (the former Dutchess County Railroad). The latter segment was abandoned in 1982, but the Beacon–Hopewell Junction segment remained in use.

Maybrook Properties, a subsidiary of the Housatonic Railroad, purchased the remaining Maybrook Line (Beacon–Hopewell Junction–Derby) from Conrail in 1992. The Metro-North Railroad purchased the New York portion of the line from Maybrook Properties in January 1995 as the Beacon Line. Metro-North filed for federal permission for adverse abandonment of the line in 2021; the Housatonic, which retained freight rights on the line; opposed. In early 2023, Metro-North filed for federal permission to acquire the Housatonic's freight rights and to discontinue the New York portion of the Beacon Line, which would be converted to a rail trail. The Housatonic indicated that it had not operated any trains on the line in two years and did not object to abandonment. However, in July 2023, the Surface Transportation Board denied Metro-North's request on procedural grounds. Metro-North again filed for abandonment in December 2023. The filing was approved and took effect in February 2024.

== Route ==
Map of Central New England Railway lines in the Upper Hudson Valley, with the Newburgh, Dutchess and Connecticut Railroad and the Clove Branch in purple ( )

The Newburgh, Dutchess and Connecticut Railroad ran about 58.9 miles (94.8 km) diagonally across Dutchess County, New York, from the Hudson River to the Connecticut state line. Its southwest end was at Dutchess Junction in Fishkill, where it connected with the Hudson River Railroad. The line followed the Fishkill Creek valley northeast to Hopewell Junction, where it crossed the New York and New England Railroad and Dutchess County Railroad. From there the line gradually turned northward into steeper terrain, with a difficult grade from Moore's Mills to Verbank then a curving route around Oak Summit into Millbrook.

The Poughkeepsie and Eastern Railway joined the ND&C at Stissing Junction, with trackage rights on the ND&C up to a split just south of Pine Plains. (After 1910, the connector to the CNE mainline also split at the latter junction.) The ND&C turned east at Pine Plains, with an average grade of nearly 1% for the next 10 miles (16 km) to Winchells. This included sections of 2.8% near Shekomeko and 1.9% approaching Winchells. Some 3.5 miles (5.6 km) of 1.5% downgrade followed as the line approached Millerton, where it crossed the New York and Harlem Railroad. At the state line, the line met the Hartford and Connecticut Western Railroad and the Poughkeepsie and Eastern Railroad. The maximum speed allowed between State Line and Pine Plains for passenger trains was just 23 miles per hour (37 km/h) due to the steep grades.

A short branch at the southwest end, originally constructed by the NY&NE, split at Wicopee Junction west of Matteawan. It ran northwest, crossing over the Hudson River Railroad and terminating at the ferry landing at Fishkill Landing (now Beacon). The Clove Branch Railroad, always closely associated with the ND&C, ran 8 miles (13 km) east from Clove Branch to Clove Valley.

=== Station listing ===
Most stations on the line were simple square structures with flat roofs.

Miles (km)	Municipality	Station	Connections and notes
	Beacon	Beacon	On 1881-built spur. Connection with Hudson River Railroad.
0.0 (0.0)	Fishkill (town)	Dutchess Junction	Connection with Hudson River Railroad
1.0 (1.6)	Beacon	–	Wickopee Junction – junction with Beacon spur
1.8 (2.9)	Beacon	Matteawan	
3.8 (6.1)	Fishkill (town)	Glenham	
5.9 (9.5)	Fishkill (village)	Fishkill	
7.7 (12.4)	Fishkill (town)	Brinckerhoff	
12.3 (19.7)	East Fishkill	Hopewell Junction	Junction with New York and New England Railroad and Dutchess County Railroad
13.4 (21.5)	East Fishkill	Clove Branch	Junction with Clove Branch Railroad
15.7 (25.3)	East Fishkill	Arthursburg	
17.3 (27.9)	LaGrange	Lagrange	
18.8 (30.3)	LaGrange	Billings	
21.4 (34.4)	LaGrange	Moores Mills	
23.5 (37.8)	Union Vale	Verbank Village	
24.4 (39.2)	Union Vale	Verbank	
27.2 (43.8)	Washington	Oak Summit	
29.1 (46.9)	Millbrook	Millbrook	
32.7 (52.7)	Washington	Shunpike	
34.5 (55.5)	Stanford	Anson's Crossing	
36.3 (58.4)	Stanford	Bangall	
38.7 (62.3)	Stanford	Stissing Junction	Junction with Poughkeepsie and Eastern Railroad
40.5 (65.1)	Stanford	Attlebury	
42.7 (68.7)	Pine Plains	Briarcliff Farms	
43.6 (70.2)	Pine Plains	–	Junction with Poughkeepsie and Eastern Railroad and Poughkeepsie and Connecticut Railroad
43.9 (70.6)	Pine Plains	Pine Plains	
46.1 (74.2)	Pine Plains	Bethel	
49.1 (79.1)	North East	Shekomeko	
51.8 (83.3)	Pine Plains	Husted	
53.5 (86.0)	Pine Plains	Winchells	
57.3 (92.2)	North East	–	Junction with New York and Harlem Railroad
57.8 (93.1)	North East	Millerton	
58.9 (94.7)	North East	State Line	Junction with Hartford and Connecticut Western Railroad and Poughkeepsie and Eastern Railroad
