= Millerton station =

Railway station in Millerton, New York, US

Millerton
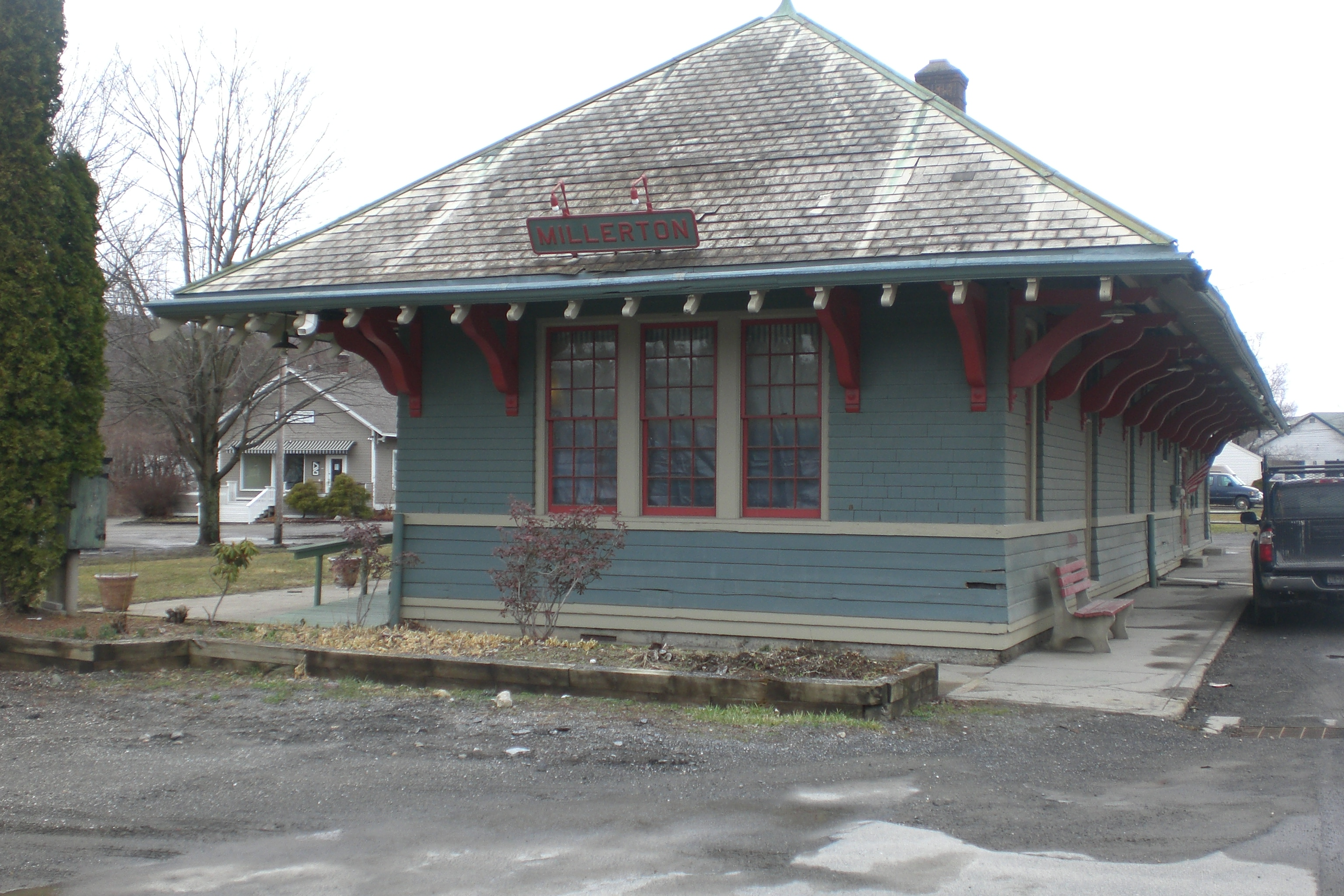
- The former 1911-built Millerton NYCRR station, which replaced the still existing 1852 NY&H station.

General information
- Location: 20 North Center Street, Millerton, New York 12546
- Coordinates: 41.9539°N 73.5115°W
- Tracks: 1

History
- Opened: May 10, 1852
- Closed: March 20, 1972 (passenger service); March 27, 1980 (freight)

Former services
| Preceding station | New York Central Railroad | Following station |
|---|---|---|
| Coleman's toward New York | Harlem Division | Mount Riga toward Chatham |
Location

The Millerton station is a former New York Central Railroad (NYC) station on the NYC's Harlem Division that served the residents of Millerton, New York.

== History ==
Millerton station was located on the NYC Harlem Division, originally the New York & Harlem Railroad. Tracks first reached Millerton after 1848, and reached the end of the line in Chatham in 1852. The NY&H was acquired by New York Central and Hudson River Railroad in 1864 and eventually became the Upper Harlem Division of the New York Central Railroad. The station included a passenger station and a freight station, and also served the Newburgh, Dutchess and Connecticut Railroad, and even a spur from the Main Line of the Central New England Railway. In 1911, the NY&H passenger station was replaced by a new station built by NYC, but all three station houses still survive to this day. It was one of the stations on the Harlem Line to serve the Berkshire Hills Express and other limited stop trains that went from New York City all the way to Pittsfield, Massachusetts and North Adams, Massachusetts in the Berkshires. Such through trains were replaced by shuttle transfers in 1950. Passenger service ended at Millerton on March 20, 1972, when successor Penn Central won a heated court battle to end its unsubsidized train service north of Dover Plains. Freight service continued, though the station itself was closed permanently by the winter of 1975.

Freight service continued to be provided by Penn Central Railroad until the advent of Conrail on April 1, 1976. All freight service north of Wassaic to Ghent was terminated on this date; however, the New York State Department of Transportation subsidized freight service between Millerton and Wassaic until March 27, 1980, when the line between Wassaic and Millerton was abandoned. The tracks were removed during the summer of 1981, however upon removal of tracks the railroad siding for the old Agway feed store remains in place. The station is currently the home of Steed Real Estate. There are plans to extend the Harlem Valley Rail Trail as far north as Chatham, the original terminus of the NYCRR Harlem Division.

== Station layout ==
Millerton had two tracks previously with a side platform on the west side of the tracks closest to the station house.
