= Poughkeepsie and Eastern Railway =

Railway in New York

- Map of the owned sections of the Poughkeepsie and Eastern Railway (not including the connection via the Dutchess and Columbia Railroad)

Overview
- Locale: Poughkeepsie, NY to Boston Corners, NY
- Dates of operation: 1872–1938

Technical
- Track gauge: 4 ft 8 1/2 in (1,435 mm) standard gauge

The Poughkeepsie and Eastern Railway was the first railroad to run east from Poughkeepsie, New York, and was taken over by the New York, New Haven and Hartford Railroad and assigned to the Central New England Railway in 1907.

== History ==
=== Beginnings ===
The Poughkeepsie and Eastern Railroad was chartered April 13, 1866 to be built from Poughkeepsie on the Hudson River northeast to Boston Corners in Ancram, Columbia County, NY, and then southeast to the Connecticut state line, where it would connect with the Connecticut Western Railroad, which would continue east to Hartford, Connecticut.

The line opened on January 24, 1871, and ran from Poughkeepsie to Stissing. At Stissing the P&E had trackage rights to use that portion of the Dutchess and Columbia Railroad line that ran from Stissing to Pine Plains. On October 1, 1872, the remainder of the P&E line was opened from Pine Plains to the state line.

The P&E's main yard and engine facilities were at the Smith Street Yard in Poughkeepsie, where there was a passenger station, a freight house, turntable and engine house. The local trolley line on Smith St. also served the station. From the Poughkeepsie yard P&E trains traveled east through Pleasant Valley, Salt Point, Clinton Corners, Stanfordville, Stissing, Pine Plains, Boston Corners and State Line near Millerton.

It was anticipated that in addition to passenger service, the railroad would make money hauling iron ore from the ore beds of Columbia County, and milk from local dairy farms; however, revenues were not as great as expected.

=== Receivership ===
On June 24, 1874, the company went into receivership. It was sold in April 1875 and reorganized May 15 as the Poughkeepsie, Hartford and Boston Railroad. It again went bankrupt and on January 26, 1884, the Hartford and Connecticut Western Railroad bought the section southeast of Boston Corners, to which they already had track rights. The rest was sold in late 1886 and on January 22, 1887, it was reorganized as the New York and Massachusetts Railway. Profit was still hard to come by, and it entered receivership for a third time in February 1893. It was sold under foreclosure March 2 and reorganized April 13 once under the name, the Poughkeepsie and Eastern Railway Company. Yet again, on June 17, 1898, the company went into receivership.

On July 12, 1904, P&E had a wreck at Salt Point when a passenger train was mistakenly switched to a siding where a freight train was waiting. The conductor on the passenger train was injured.

In 1907 the New York, New Haven and Hartford Railroad bought it and on June 25 merged it into the Central New England Railway.

The CNE had been forced to build the parallel Poughkeepsie and Connecticut Railroad in the late 1880s due to the Poughkeepsie and Eastern's refusal to sell. In 1910 the P&C was abandoned between Salt Point and Pine Plains, with trains rerouted over the P&E. With the 1925 abandonment of the P&E from Ancram Lead Mines northeast to Boston Corners, the P&C served as the sole route east of Pine Plains (it too was closed in 1932). Abandonment came in 1938 to the rest of the P&E.

== Station listing ==
Map of Central New England Railway lines in the Upper Hudson Valley, with the Poughkeepsie and Eastern Railway in blue ( )

Mileages reflect those after the 1910 consolidation, with the ex-Poughkeepsie and Connecticut Railroad serving as the Poughkeepsie entry. Prior to 1910, the line used a station on its own alignment west of Smith Street in Poughkeepsie (though mileages were not substantially different). Between Stissing Junction and Pine Plains, the line used trackage rights on the Newburgh, Dutchess and Connecticut Railroad (ND&C).

Miles (km)	Municipality	Station	Connections and notes
0.0 (0.0)	Poughkeepsie (city)	Poughkeepsie	
1.8 (2.9)	Poughkeepsie (town)	–	Junction with Poughkeepsie and Connecticut Railroad
3.8 (6.1)	Poughkeepsie (town)	Van Wagner's	
6.1 (9.8)	Pleasant Valley	Pleasant Valley	
10.7 (17.2)	Pleasant Valley	Salt Point	
12.2 (19.6)	Clinton	West Hibernia	
13.2 (21.2)	Clinton	Clinton Corners	
14.2 (22.8)	Stanford	Upton Lake	
15.8 (25.4)	Stanford	Willow Brook	
17.8 (28.6)	Stanford	Stanfordville	
19.8 (31.8)	Stanford	McIntyre	
21.1 (34.0)	Stanford	Stissing Junction	Junction with ND&C
22.9 (36.8)	Pine Plains	Attlebury	
25.1 (40.3)	Pine Plains	Briarcliff Farms	
26.3 (42.2)	Pine Plains	–	Junction with Poughkeepsie and Connecticut Railroad (1910-built connector) and ND&C
26.6 (42.7)	Pine Plains	Pine Plains	
30.7 (49.5)	Ancram	Ancram Lead Mines	
32.5 (52.3)	Ancram	Halstead's	
34.4 (55.3)	Ancram	Tanner's	
37.1 (59.8)	Ancram	Boston Corners	Junction with Rhinebeck and Connecticut Railroad and NYC Harlem Division
41.0 (66.0)	North East	Mount Riga	Shared station with the Harlem Division
44.1 (70.9)	North East	State Line	Junction with Hartford and Connecticut Western Railroad and ND&C
