= Ancram =

Ancram may refer to:

- The Earl of Ancram, peerage of Scotland
  - Michael Ancram (1945-2024), British politician
- Ancram, New York, a town in Columbia County
