= Maybrook Yard =

Rail yard in Maybrook, New York

Coordinates: 41.49847°N 74.20598°W

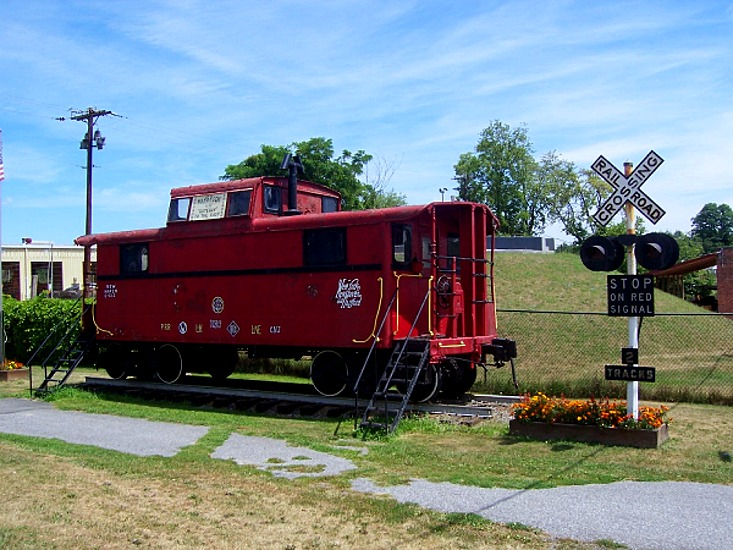
A caboose along NY 208 in the village acknowledges the role the yard played in the village's development

Maybrook Yard was a major rail yard located in Maybrook, New York. It was the western gateway of its long-time owner, the New York, New Haven and Hartford Railroad and its predecessors. It was here that freight cars were interchanged between railroads from the west and the New Haven, whose Maybrook Line headed east over the Poughkeepsie Bridge to the railroad's main freight yard at Cedar Hill Yard in New Haven, Connecticut.

The rail line through the yard was finished in 1889 by the Hudson Connecting Railroad. The yard was soon acquired by the Central New England Railway, but traffic never justified more than one yard and a five-stall roundhouse. The yard was transformed after control of the Maybrook Line was purchased in 1904 by the New Haven who saw it as an easier way to get their heavy freight traffic across the Hudson River than using barges in New York City. To handle the new traffic the yard was dramatically expanded in 1912 to three miles in length with six separate yards including two hump yards. A new 10-stall roundhouse with a 95-foot turntable replaced the original and was later expanded to 27 stalls. Also added was a large icing plant for refrigerator cars. At its height, the yard had 177 tracks totaling over 71 track-miles.

By the 1950s the yard had shrunk to 99 tracks and around 50 track-miles. In 1960 both hump yards were converted to conventional yards with flat switching. By the mid-1960s, freight switching activity had fallen to what it was before the New Haven gained control as connecting railroads shut down or merged, allowing the remaining traffic to run-through without being switched. The Penn Central's acquisition of the New Haven in 1969 resulted in connecting traffic with the Erie Lackawanna being discouraged as it competed with other Penn Central routes. After 1971 only one train in each direction (for the Erie Lackawanna) stopped, but only to change crews. Traffic through the yard ended abruptly in 1974 when the Poughkeepsie Bridge burned and was not repaired, severing the Maybrook Line. By then the yard had already closed.

For much of its existence six class I railroads interchanged traffic at the yard with the New Haven Railroad. In 1956 the yard saw 19 arrivals and 18 departures of which 14 were operated by the New Haven, eight by the Lehigh and Hudson River Railway, seven by the Erie Railroad, four by the New York, Ontario and Western Railway, two by the Lehigh and New England Railroad and two by the New York Central Railroad.

Today much of the former yard has been converted into a Yellow Freight truck facility. Rail service is still provided to customers in Maybrook by the Middletown and New Jersey Railroad on tracks owned by Norfolk Southern.
