= Stissing Junction =

Coordinates: 41.913°N 73.682°W

Stissing Junction was a railroad junction where the Dutchess and Columbia Railroad joined with the Poughkeepsie and Eastern Railroad, and the Poughkeepsie and Connecticut Railroad. It was located approximately 3–4 miles south of Pine Plains, New York.

From Stissing Junction north to Pine Plains, the Poughkeepsie and Eastern leased the tracks from the Dutchess and Columbia (both ran on one track), while the Poughkeepsie and Connecticut ran parallel to the latter (on the west side) also north, via Pine Plains, to the Rhinebeck and Connecticut at Silvernails.

Several concrete structures (i.e., water tower supports) still exist at this site, and it has now become a wildlife sanctuary. The area is located just off Stissing Road, near Mountain Road, between the hamlets of Bangall and Attlebury). One can walk along the old tracks which are now grass paths, with the Wappinger Creek running alongside (east side of tracks).
