= Archibald McLeod =

Archibald McLeod may refer to:

- Archibald Norman McLeod (1772–after 1837), partner of the North West Company and political figure in Lower Canada
- Archibald Angus McLeod (1844–1902), Scottish-born American financier and railroad executive
- Archie McLeod (Archibald M. McLeod), Scottish football forward
