= Simons General Store =

Historic commercial building in New York, United States

- U.S. National Register of Historic Places
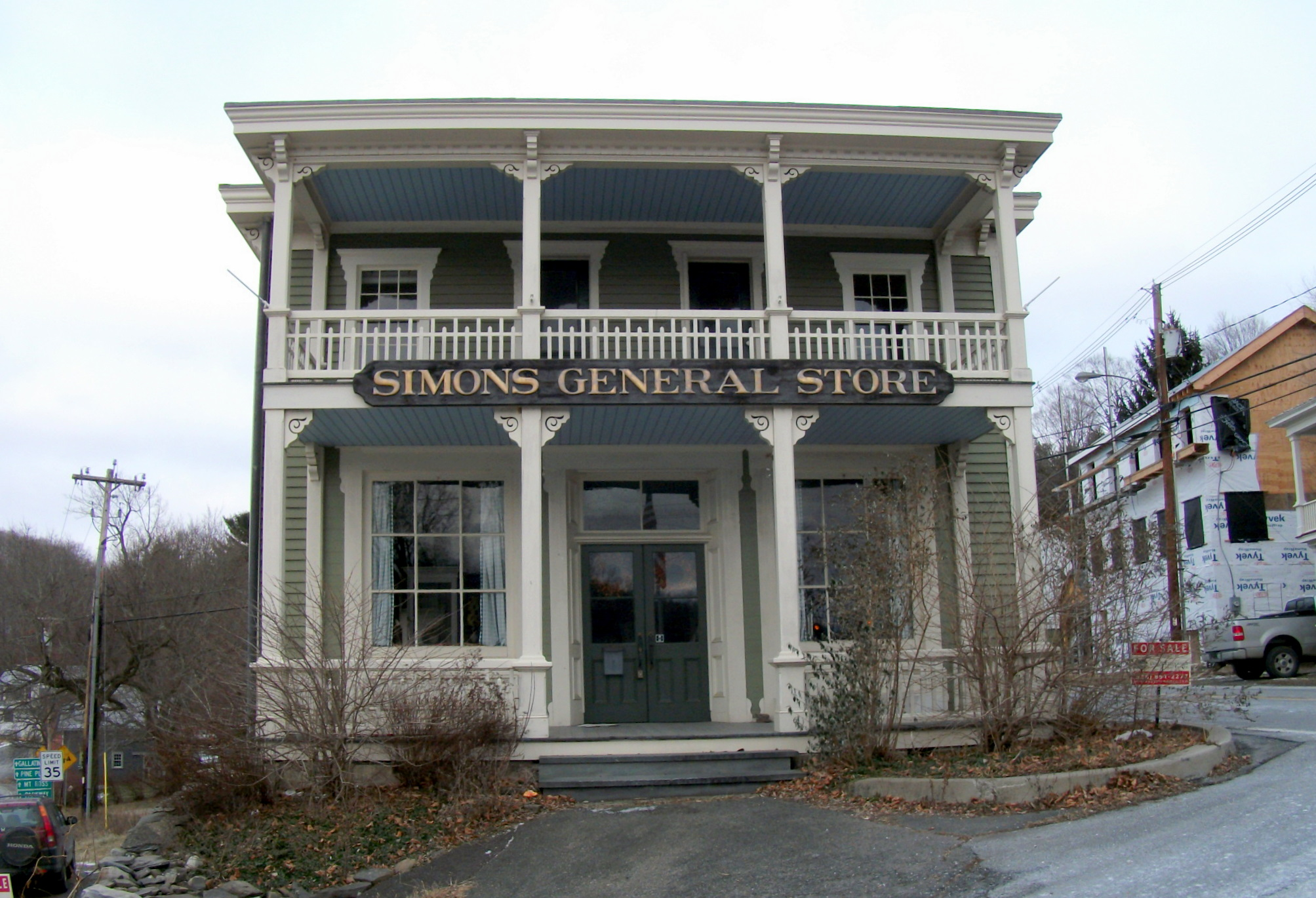
- Simons General Store, December 2010

- Location within New York Location within the United States
- Location: Ancram Sq., Ancram, New York
- Coordinates: 42°3′2″N 73°38′16″W
- Area: 0.8 acres (0.32 ha)
- Built: 1873
- NRHP reference No.: 73001171
- Added to NRHP: April 23, 1973

Simons General Store is a historic general store located at Ancram in Columbia County, New York. It was built in 1873–74 and is a rectangular shaped three story frame structure. It features a cupola and an elaborate two story piazza. The interior features original furniture and fixtures dating between 1874 and 1895, with electric fixtures dating between 1911 and 1915.

It was added to the National Register of Historic Places in 1973.
