= Boston Corner, New York =

Hamlet in New York, United States

- Hamlet
- Location in New York
- Coordinates: 42°03′N 73°31′W
- Country: United States
- State: New York
- County: Columbia
- Town: Ancram
- Incorporated: 1838
- Ceded: January 11, 1855

Boston Corner is a hamlet of the town of Ancram in Columbia County, New York, United States and the town of Northeast in Dutchess County. The District of Boston Corner was incorporated by Massachusetts in 1838 from a tract of unincorporated land west of the town of Mount Washington, Massachusetts, and was ceded from Massachusetts to New York on January 11, 1855, because its geographical isolation from the rest of Massachusetts made maintaining law and order difficult.

Three railroads—New York Central's Harlem Line, the Poughkeepsie and Eastern Railway, and the Rhinebeck and Connecticut Railroad—once served the hamlet. The New York Central stop was called Boston Corners station. All lines have since been abandoned.

== History ==
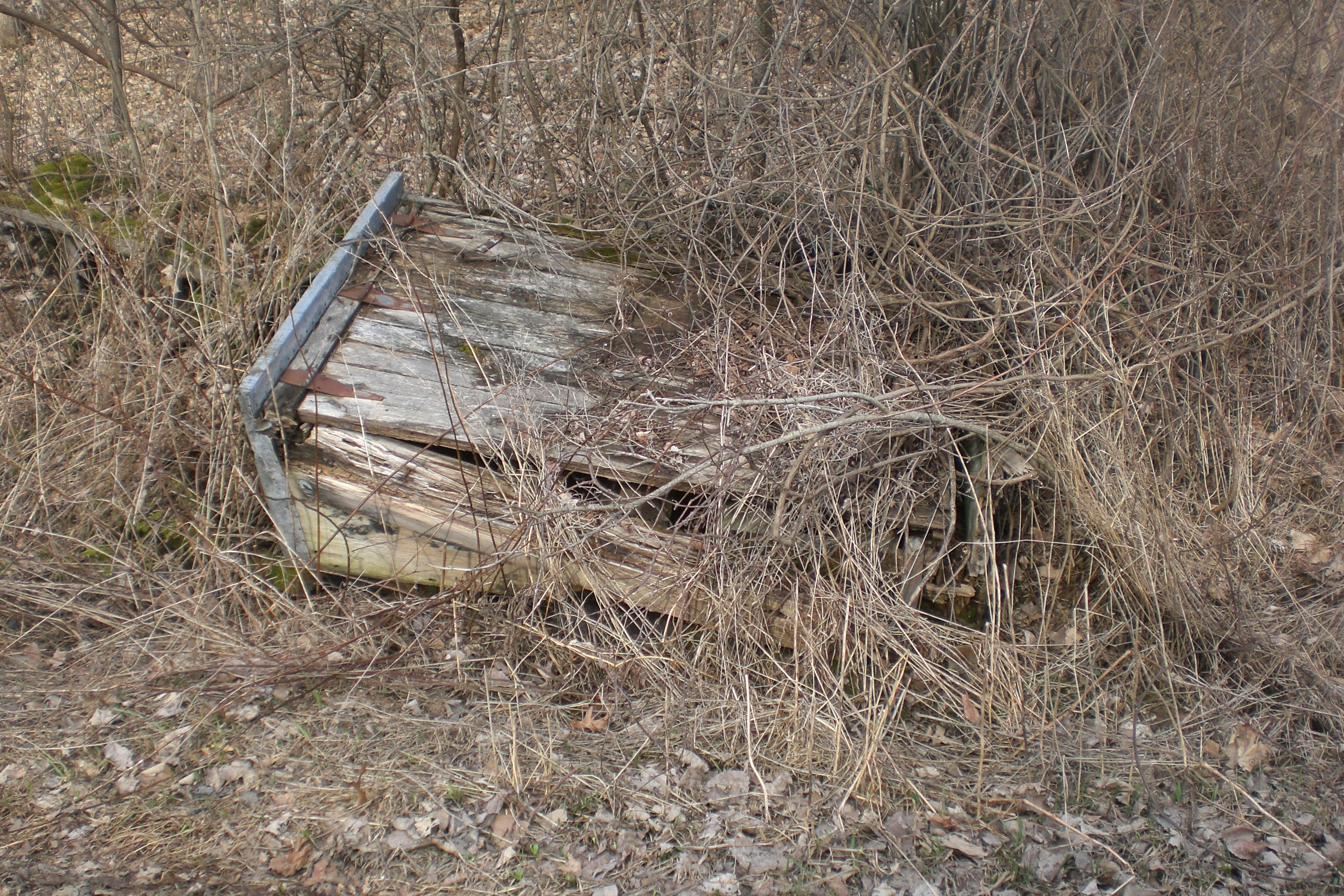
A signal box at the former Boston Corners railroad station.

=== 1878 description ===
Boston Corners is a small hamlet situated at the junction of the three railroads running through the town. It contains one hotel, one store, one blacksmith-shop, a fine depot, and about a dozen dwellings, of which nearly half are [to the south] in the town of North East, in Dutchess County. The name was given to the locality when the State of Massachusetts owned the triangular tract of land lying west of the Taghkanic [i.e. Taconic] mountains. The mountain formed an almost impassable barrier between this spot and the seat of civil authority, and it became a sort of "city of refuge" for criminals and outlaws of all classes, who fled to it to escape from the reach of the officers of the law. On this account it also became a resort of prize-fighters, who could here carry out their brutal and inhuman purposes secure from the interference of the authorities. The celebrated fight between John Morrissey and Yankee Sullivan occurred here. For these reasons it finally became necessary to make some change to enable the civil authorities to enforce the laws protective of peace and property, and in December 1848, the inhabitants petitioned to be annexed to the State of New York. The State of Massachusetts consented in May 1853. The cession was accepted by New York, July 21, 1853; confirmed by Congress, Jan. 3, 1855; and the corner was annexed to Ancram NY, April 13, 1857.

The first hotel-keeper here was a man named Albison, who also kept a store. His building was on the site of the present hotel, and was torn down in 1857–58, and rebuilt by Abram I. Vosburgh, whose son M. B. Vosburgh, is the present proprietor. On a brick was found the date of the erection, but it is not remembered, and the brick is lost. Albison also owned a grist-mill, a carding-machine, a fulling and cloth-dressing mill, and a saw-mill, all located on the brook near the present depot. These buildings were abandoned and torn down many years ago, the last one being demolished by the New York and Harlem railroad in 1852. This property was also owned among others by Horace Langdon, Jacob Decker, Andris Van Deusen, James Freeman, and Milo Barnum, father of William H. Barnum, the present United States senator from Connecticut, who was born here.

David Williams started the first blacksmith-shop about 1818. He was a Welshman and came from New Jersey. His shop was on the corner near the line of the town of North East.

Smith Vosburgh kept the first store, near the depot, at the place now kept by Eugene McIntyre.

— Ellis, Capt. Franklin, "Boston Corners and Weed Mine, Ancram, Columbia County, New York". History of Columbia County, New York. 1878. p. 407.

Although the above description implies the Morrissey/Sullivan fight (and resulting riot) was a primary cause for the annexation, those events actually took place on October 12, 1853, twelve weeks after the cession was agreed to by both states but more than a year before Congress made the transfer official.
