= Central New England Railway =

Railroad in the northeastern US

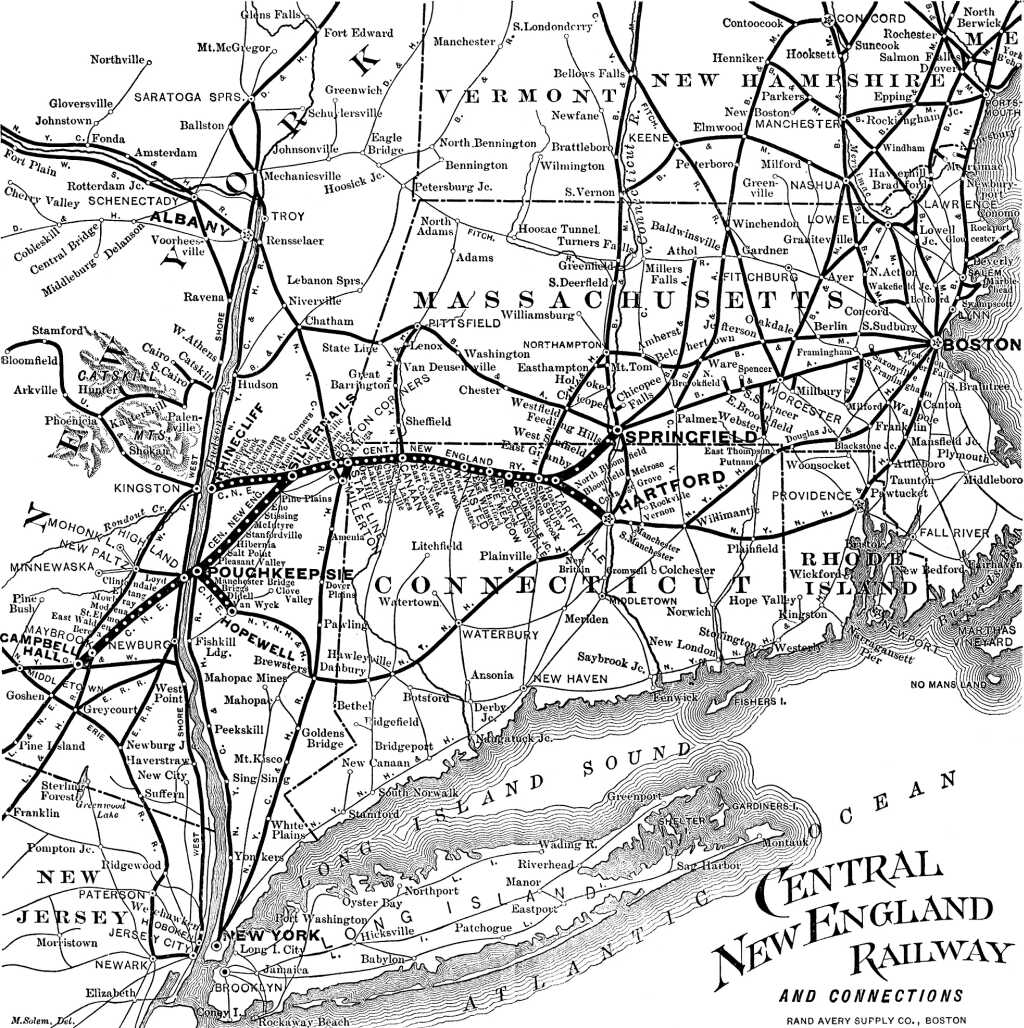
- CNE system map, c. 1901

Overview
- Reporting mark: CNE
- Locale: Connecticut; Massachusetts; New York
- Dates of operation: 1871–1927
- Successor: New York, New Haven & Hartford Railroad

Technical
- Track gauge: 4 ft 8 1/2 in (1,435 mm) standard gauge

The Central New England Railway (reporting mark CNE) was a railroad from Hartford, Connecticut, and Springfield, Massachusetts, west across northern Connecticut and across the Hudson River on the Poughkeepsie Bridge to Maybrook, New York. It was part of the Poughkeepsie Bridge Route, an alliance between railroads for a passenger route from Washington to Boston, and was acquired by the New York, New Haven & Hartford Railroad (the New Haven) in 1904. The New Haven ran the CNE as a separate company until finally merging it in 1927. The vast majority of the system was abandoned by the 1930s and 1940s. Surviving portions of the Central New England Railway are operated by the Central New England Railroad and the Housatonic Railroad.

== History ==
=== Hartford west: 1868-1889 ===
The Connecticut Western Railroad was chartered June 25, 1868 to run from Hartford, Connecticut, west to the New York state line, where it would meet the Dutchess & Columbia Railroad just east of Millerton, New York. The line was completed December 21, 1871; the previous month the company had leased the easternmost section of the D&C to gain access to the New York & Harlem Railroad at Millerton. The only branch was a short one in Connecticut, south into Collinsville, which would not be completed until December, 1874. The Connecticut Western became bankrupt on April 27, 1880, and on March 31, 1881 it was reorganized as the Hartford & Connecticut Western Railroad.

In the meantime, the Rhinebeck & Connecticut Railroad was organized in New York on June 29, 1870 to build from Rhinecliff on the Hudson River east to the Connecticut state line to join the Connecticut Western. The line opened to the public on April 14, 1875, running from Rhinecliff east to Boston Corners, New York. From Boston Corners to the state line, the R&C obtained trackage rights over the track of the Poughkeepsie & Eastern Railroad, which junctioned with the Connecticut Western and Dutchess and Columbia at the state line.

On July 1, 1882 the Hartford & Connecticut Western bought the Rhinebeck & Connecticut Railroad, giving it a line from Hartford to the Hudson River. The Poughkeepsie, Hartford & Boston Railroad, the successor to the Poughkeepsie & Eastern, went bankrupt in the 1880s, and on January 26, 1884, the H&CW outright bought the line east of Boston Corners that it had operated under trackage rights.

=== Poughkeepsie Bridge: 1871-1899 ===
Over the years, several plans had been made for a fixed span across the Hudson River south of Albany to replace the numerous car float operations. One of the most persistent was originally chartered in 1868 as the Hudson Highland Suspension Bridge Company, and would have crossed from Anthony's Nose to Fort Clinton, now roughly the site of the Bear Mountain Bridge.

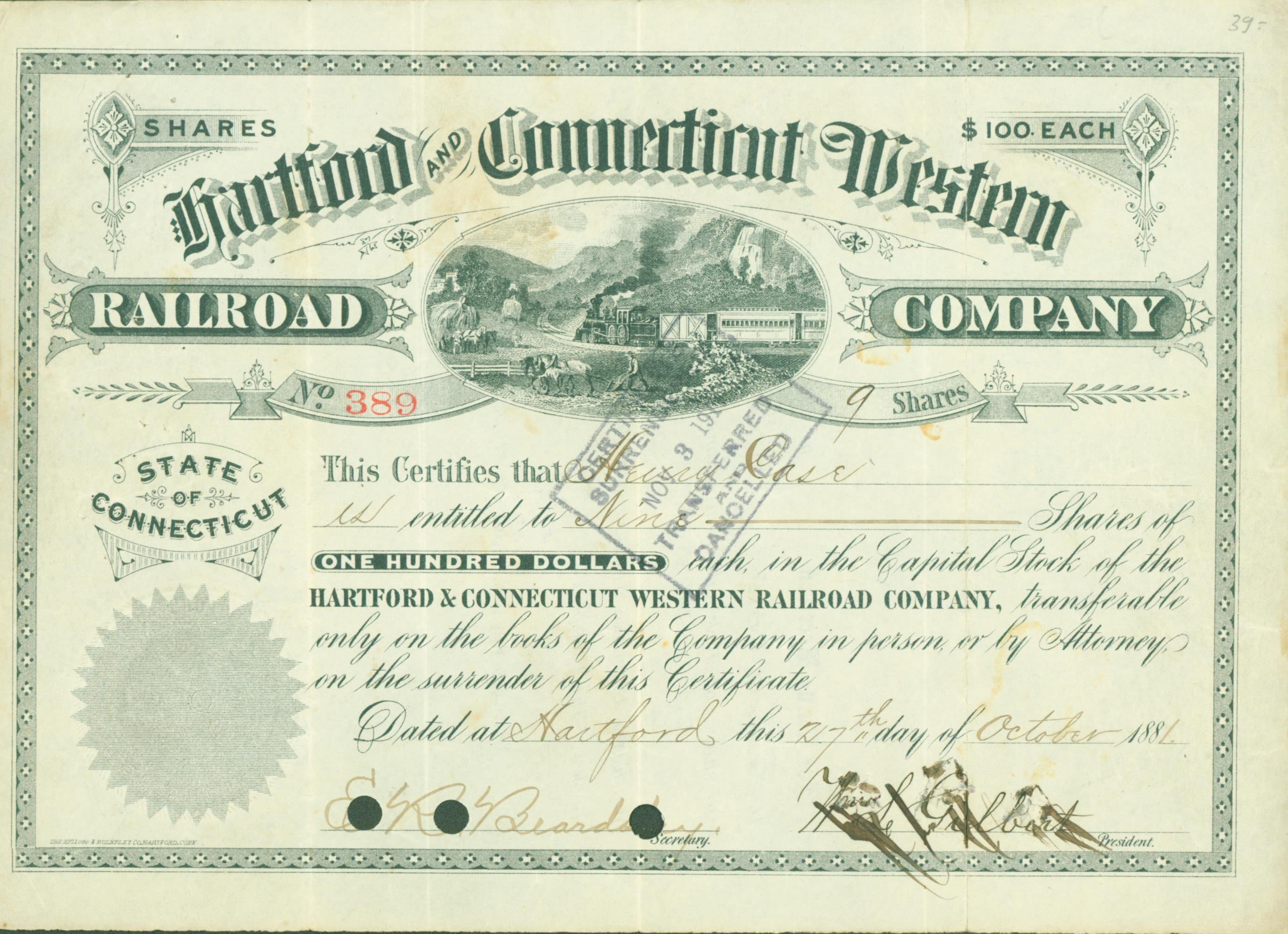
Share of the Hartford and Connecticut Western Railroad Company, issued 27 October 1881

The proposal that was eventually built was the Poughkeepsie Bridge at Poughkeepsie. The Poughkeepsie Bridge Company was chartered in June 1871 to build the bridge, and the first train crossed the bridge on December 29, 1888. The Hudson Connecting Railroad was chartered in 1887 to build southwest from the bridge, and about the same time the Poughkeepsie & Connecticut Railroad was chartered to continue the line northeast from Poughkeepsie. The bridge company had hoped to acquire the Poughkeepsie, Hartford & Boston Railroad, but was unable to, and so chartered the P&C to run parallel, ending at the Hartford & Connecticut Western Railroad at Silvernails, NY. The connections were not completed until 1889, and on July 22 the two approaches merged to form the Central New England & Western Railroad. That same year the CNE&W leased the Hartford and Connecticut Western, giving it a route from Hartford all the way across the Hudson River to Maybrook and Campbell Hall, New York. Maybrook/Campbell Hall soon became a major junction point for many railroads transferring cars to the CNE&W. The Delaware & New England Railroad was also formed in 1889 as a holding company to own the CNE&W and Poughkeepsie Bridge Company.

In April 1890 the CNE&W chartered the Dutchess County Railroad to run southeast from the east end of the bridge in Poughkeepsie to Hopewell Junction, the west end of the New York & New England Railroad (NY&NE) at the Newburgh, Dutchess and Connecticut Railroad. The line opened May 8, 1892, giving the NY&NE a route to the bridge.

The Reading Company (RDG) bought the CNE&W and Poughkeepsie Bridge Company from D&NE in January 1892, extending RDG's influence to New England via the Pennsylvania, Poughkeepsie & Boston Railroad. The two companies merged on August 1, 1892 to form the Philadelphia, Reading & New England Railroad (PR&NE). RDG proved unable to handle its new acquisitions, and PR&NE defaulted on its interest payments in May 1893. The final reorganization came on January 12, 1899 with the formation of the Central New England Railway (CNE).

=== Central New England Railway: 1899-1927 ===
Central New England Railway lines in the Upper Hudson Valley, colored by the company that constructed each line Rhinebeck and Connecticut Railroad Poughkeepsie and Eastern Railroad Poughkeepsie and Connecticut Railroad Dutchess and Columbia Railroad Connecticut Western Railroad Hudson Connecting Railroad Poughkeepsie Bridge Company Dutchess County Railroad New York and New England Railroad New York Central Railroad (not part of the CNE)

The original Connecticut Western had from the start been interested in building a branch from Tariffville, Connecticut, to Springfield, Massachusetts and the CNE finally began it in 1899. Thwarted by the New York, New Haven & Hartford Railroad's (NH) surreptitious grab of a parcel of land known as Montague Farm and legal maneuvers thereafter, the East Granby and Suffield Railroad had to be incorporated in 1901 to build a loop around the farm and rejoin the branch which connected with the Boston & Albany Railroad at Agawam Junction in West Springfield, Massachusetts. From West Springfield to Springfield, trackage rights were obtained over the B&A. The branch opened on September 12, 1902. Less than six months after the Springfield extension debuted via the loop, the Montague property was suddenly obtainable for a pittance. CNE then completed the last 313 feet of the original line, which it had to charter separately as the Short Line Railroad Company, and passenger trains began to run via the farm on March 9, 1903. The loop was retained briefly for freight use but was ended by May 1904. NH acquired financial control of CNE that same year, mostly for the Poughkeepsie Bridge and western connection at Maybrook that it would soon develop to its fullest potential. CNE was allowed to operate separately, but the lease of the Dutchess County Railroad was assigned to NH on December 1 to allow its access to the bridge. The Newburgh, Dutchess & Connecticut Railroad and Poughkeepsie & Eastern Railway (P&E) acquired by the NH in 1905 and 1907, were both assigned to the CNE and merged into it June 25, 1907 (along with the Dutchess County Railroad). The ND&C gave CNE a route from Millerton southwest to the Hudson River at Beacon, intersecting the Dutchess County at Hopewell Junction, and P&E ran parallel to the main line from Boston Corners southwest to Poughkeepsie. By 1915 the former NY&NE from Hopewell Junction to Danbury, Connecticut, would also be transferred to CNE.

In 1910 the Poughkeepsie & Connecticut main line was abandoned in favor of the parallel Poughkeepsie & Eastern Railway from Pine Plains, New York, southwest to Salt Point, where the two lines had crossed. The P&E used trackage of the Newburgh, Dutchess & Connecticut Railroad (also merged into the CNE in 1907) from Pine Plains southwest to Stissing, NY. Connections were built at both ends of the abandonment.

By the early 1920s, the New York, New Haven and Hartford had acquired access to the CNE lines. However, the NYNHH made limited use of the opportunity for long-distance east-west integration of the CNE lines with the NYNHH network. Passengers wishing for making east-west trips between the Hudson Valley and eastern Connecticut or Boston would need to take a Campbell Hall - Waterbury - Hartford train, and then transfer to one of the latter two stations to a Waterbury - Hartford - Boston train.

In 1921 the Massachusetts part of the Springfield Branch was abandoned after less than 20 years of operation. The former P&E was abandoned from Ancram Lead Mines (NY) northeast to Boston Corners in 1925; along with the concurrent abandonment of part of the former Newburgh, Dutchess & Connecticut Railroad to the south, the old Poughkeepsie and Connecticut Railroad and Rhinebeck & Connecticut Railroad was the only remaining route of three from Pine Plains to Connecticut.

=== New York, New Haven & Hartford Railroad and successors: 1927- ===
On January 1, 1927 CNE was finally merged into NH. The New Haven ended all passenger service on the CNE lines that year, with the exception of the segment running from Copake, New York, southwest to Stanfordville, Pleasant Valley and Poughkeepsie, which ran at least to January, 1932.

CNE had the steepest grades of the various east-west routes of the NH; most bridge traffic was routed via the former NY&NE to Hopewell Junction. In 1932 the former Rhinebeck & Connecticut Railroad was abandoned from Copake (northwest of Boston Corners) southeast to the state line, cutting the CNE in two. The NH had removed CNE tracks from Waterbury west to Southbury in 1937, a critical link in any east-west rail itinerary between the mid-Hudson Valley (Campbell Hall and Poughkeepsie) and eastern Connecticut (Willimantic).

More abandonments came during 1938. The main line was closed from East Canaan east to Tariffville, along with the rest of the Springfield Branch. The main line and former Rhinebeck & Connecticut were abandoned northeast and east from Poughkeepsie and Rhinecliff, as well as the parallel P&E and the main line from the state line east to Lakeville. In 1940 the main line from East Canaan to Canaan was closed, and in 1965 the line between Lakeville and Canaan was abandoned.

The Hartford & Connecticut Western Railroad was owned by NH through the CNE, but was not merged by the mid-1930s when NH became bankrupt. On December 31, 1937 the H&CW filed a reorganization plan. After a long reorganization, H&CW was merged into the NH on September 18, 1947 (along with the Providence, Warren and Bristol Railroad and Old Colony Railroad); by then all of the H&CW but the easternmost section had been abandoned.

At the time of the 1969 merger of the NH into Penn Central, all that remained of the original CNE was the westernmost section, from Maybrook over the Poughkeepsie Bridge and southeast along the Dutchess County Railroad to the former NY&NE as well as the easternmost portion to the northern part of Bloomfield, CT, from Hartford. The westernmost section was part of the Maybrook Branch, continuing east over former NY&NE and other lines to Derby. With the May 8, 1974 closure of the Poughkeepsie Bridge, the Maybrook Branch was abandoned west of Hopewell Junction. In 1976 the remaining line became part of Conrail. The Connecticut Department of Transportation later acquired it and in January 1999 the Central New England Railroad began operations on the 8.7 mile (14 km) Griffins Industrial Track. The Housatonic Railroad operates a short segment of the original CNE line in Canaan to serve a limestone quarry east of its mainline and the preserved Canaan Union Depot.
