= Maybrook Line =

Rail line in New York State and Connecticut

- Map of the Dutchess County Railroad and subsequent realignments

Overview
- Status: Metro-North (west of Hudson River): out-of-Service; Housatonic (east of Hudson River): active freight
- Owner: New York, New Haven and Hartford Railroad, Conrail
- Locale: Orange, Ulster, Dutchess, and Putnam counties in New York State; Fairfield and New Haven counties in Connecticut
- Termini: Campbell Hall, NY; Derby, CT

Service
- Type: Freight, other non-revenue
- System: Metro-North, Housatonic Railroad

History
- Opened: 1889

Technical
- Track gauge: 4 ft 8 1/2 in (1,435 mm)

The Maybrook Line was a line of the New York, New Haven and Hartford Railroad which connected with its Waterbury Branch in Derby, Connecticut, and its Maybrook Yard in Maybrook, New York, where it interchanged with other carriers. It was the main east-west freight route of the New Haven until its merger with the Penn Central in 1969.

== History ==
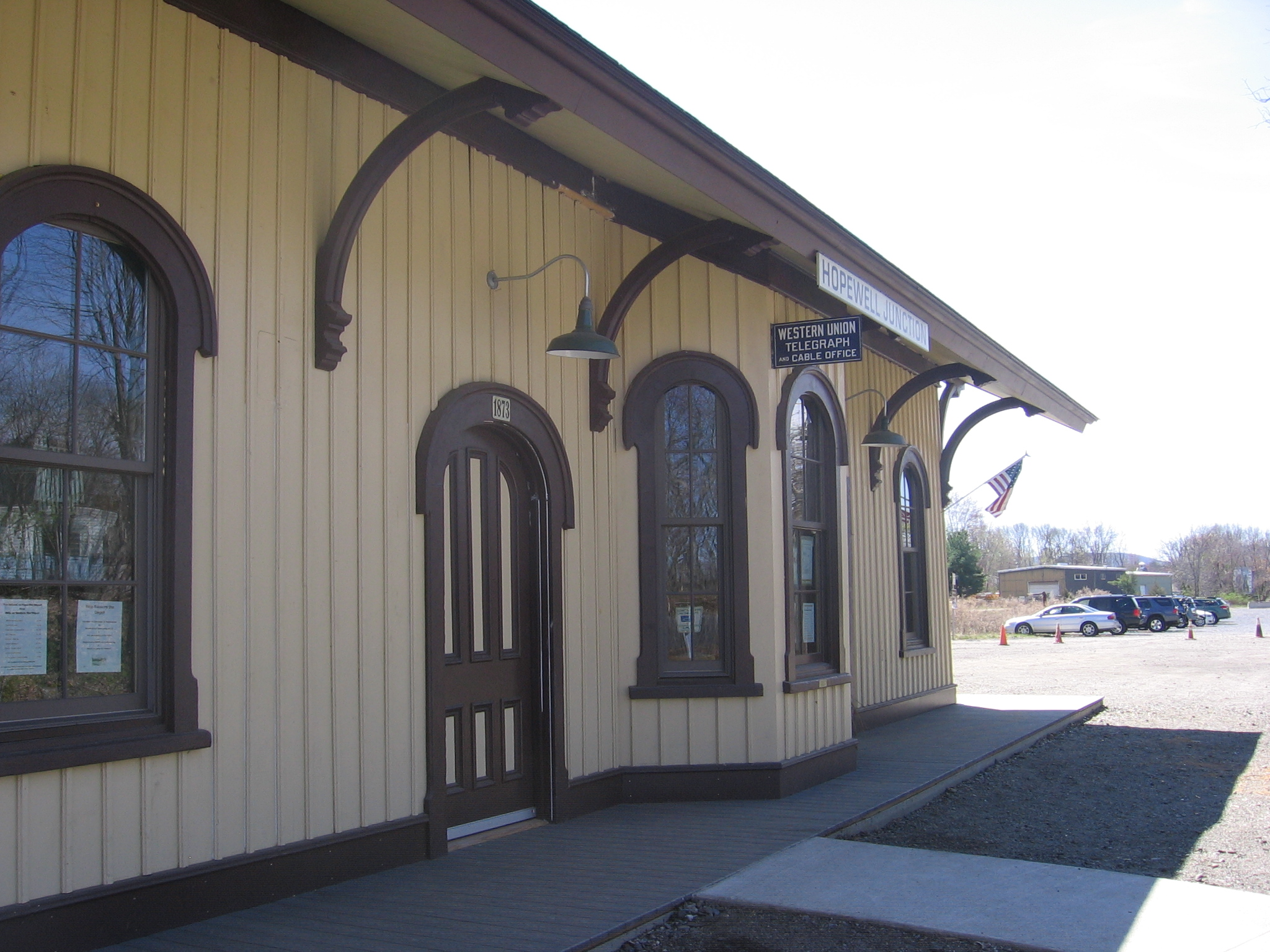
Hopewell Depot

After the New York and New England Railroad succeeded merging with the Newburgh, Dutchess and Connecticut Railroad at Hopewell Junction en route to the Fishkill Ferry station, they sought to expand traffic onto the newly built Poughkeepsie Railroad Bridge in order to move goods to the other side of the Hudson River, and the Central New England Railway was perfectly willing to provide a connection. The CNE line was originally chartered as the Dutchess County Railroad in 1889 and ran southeast from the bridge to Hopewell Junction, and was operational on May 8, 1892. The line was absorbed by the CNE in 1907, and eventually merged into the New Haven Railroad in 1927. Passenger service was phased out beginning in the 1930s, the same decade the New Haven Railroad faced crippling bankruptcy. Later financial troubles in the 1950s and 1960s led to its eventual acquisition by Penn Central Railroad in 1969.

Upon taking ownership, the Penn Central began discouraging connecting traffic on the line that paralleled Penn Central routes for the rest of its journey to prevent it from being short-hauled. After 1971 only one train in each direction (for the Erie Lackawanna) traversed the full line.

While the Penn Central did not connect with the old New Haven on the west side of the line, it came close. For a short time in 1969 and 1970, Penn Central ran a daily train between Cedar Hill Yard in New Haven, Connecticut and Potomac Yard in Alexandria, Virginia, by way of the Lehigh and Hudson River Railway, which connected with a former Pennsylvania Railroad line in Belvidere, New Jersey, 72 miles south of the old interchange with the New Haven at Maybrook Yard in Maybrook, New York. The service ended in a dispute over haulage charges and the traffic was diverted to the longer all Penn Central route through Selkirk, New York. Ironically, the only reason the Lehigh and Hudson River was not part of the Penn Central was because Penn Central predecessor, the Pennsylvania Railroad, had prevented the New Haven from acquiring it in 1905.

Through service over the line ended abruptly on May 8,1974 when the Poughkeepsie Bridge burned and was not repaired.

The portion of the line west of Hopewell Junction, New York, has been abandoned and now forms part of the Dutchess Rail Trail. The remainder of the line is owned in New York by Metro-North. In late 2020, the line east of Hopewell Junction was in disrepair and severed at the Route 311 bridge in Patterson, although all the rest of the track remains. The right of way also has a rail trail on it; it is named the Maybrook Trail and is part of the Empire State Trail joining with the Dutchess Rail Trail. In Connecticut the remainder of the line is owned by the Housatonic Railroad.

== See also ==
- Beacon Line
