= Silvernails, New York =

Location in New York, United States

Coordinates: 42°00′53″N 73°40′59″W

Silvernails is the site of a railroad junction between the former Poughkeepsie and Connecticut Railroad and Rhinebeck and Connecticut Railroad, in Columbia County, New York, United States. It is located in Gallatin, just outside Pine Plains; an old railroad station still stands at the site.
