= Archibald Angus McLeod =

American financier and railroad executive

Archibald Angus McLeod (1848–1902) was an American financier and railroad executive.

His first railroad job was as a rodman (surveyor's assistant) with the Northern Pacific Railroad. He later worked his way up the ranks of the Philadelphia and Reading Railroad to become its president in 1890. As president, he reinvigorated the fading railroad, laying new track, investing in anthracite mines, and building the grand Reading Terminal in Philadelphia, Pennsylvania. He resigned after the Panic of 1893 weakened the railroad, and moved to New York City, where he advised railroads and entered finance.
