= Ancram, New York =

- Town
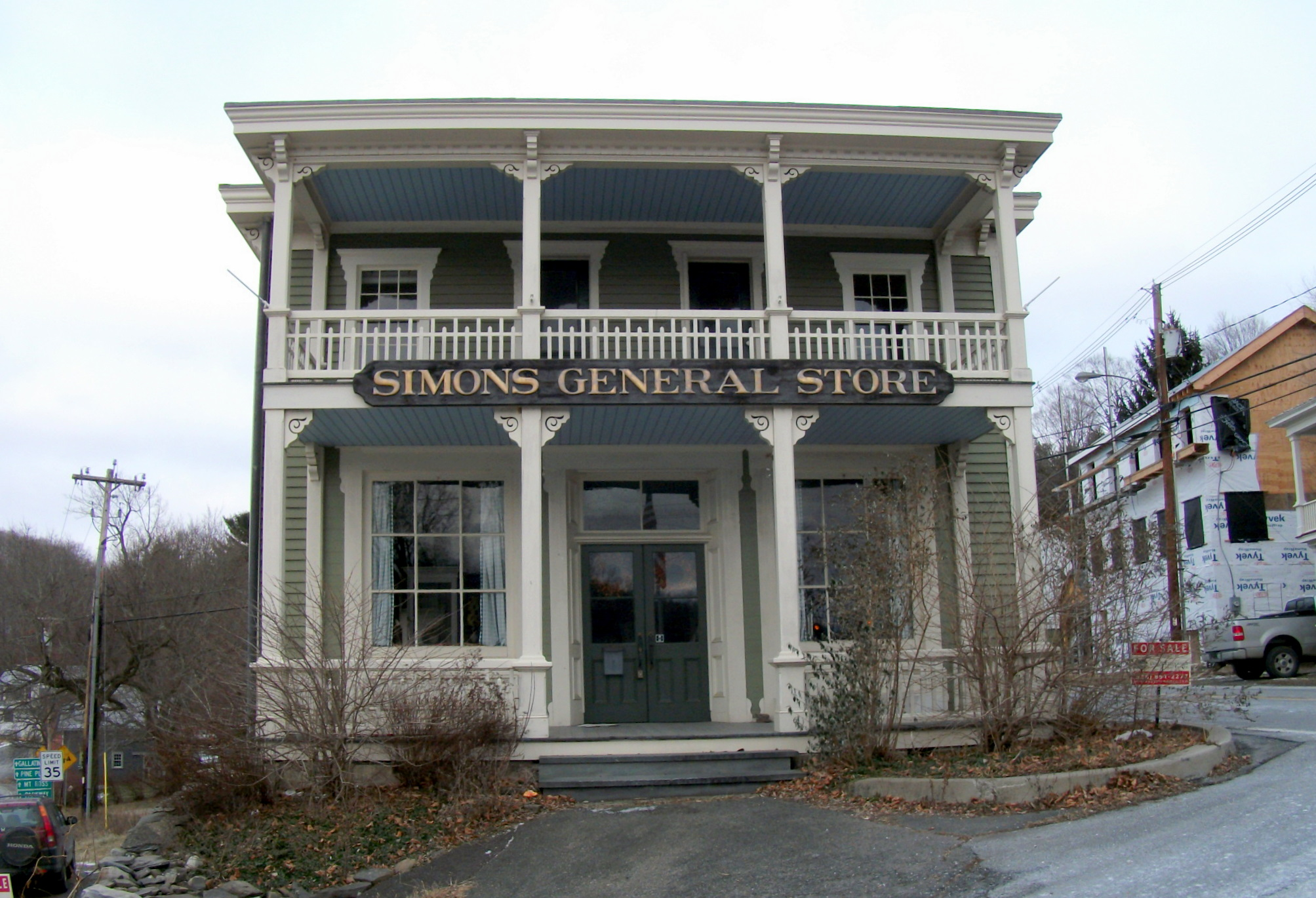
- The historic Simons General Store (built 1873–4) in the center of Ancram

- Location of Ancram, New York
- Coordinates: 42°2′N 73°36′W
- Country: United States
- State: New York
- County: Columbia
- Town of Gallatin: 1803

Government
  - Type: Town Council
  - Town Supervisor: Jim MacArthur (R)
  - Town Council: Members' List: • David Boice (R); • Amy Gold (D); • Bonnie Hundt (D); • Colleen Lutz (R)

Area
  - Total: 42.73 sq mi (110.68 km^{2})
  - Land: 42.48 sq mi (110.01 km^{2})
  - Water: 0.26 sq mi (0.67 km^{2})
- Elevation: 505 ft (154 m)

Population (2020)
  - Total: 1,440
  - Density: 33.9/sq mi (13.1/km^{2})
- Time zone: UTC-5 (Eastern (EST))
  - Summer (DST): UTC-4 (EDT)
- ZIP Codes: 12502 (Ancram); 12503 (Ancramdale); 12516 (Copake); 12546 (Millerton); 12567 (Pine Plains)
- Area code: 518
- FIPS code: 36-021-02099
- GNIS feature ID: 0978679
- Website: www.townofancram.org

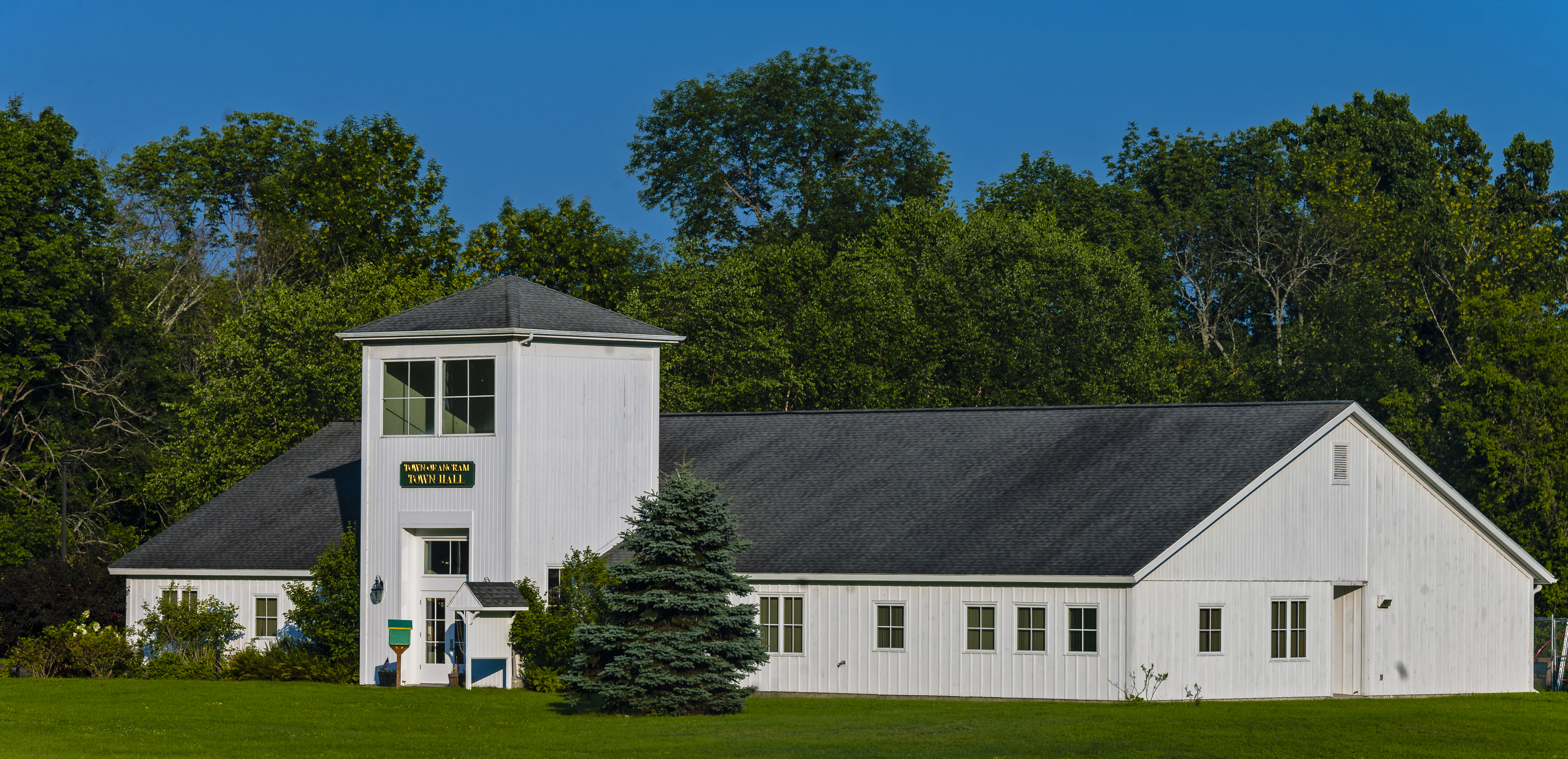
Town hall

Ancram is a town in Columbia County, New York, United States. The population was 1,440 at the 2020 census, down from 1,573 at the 2010 census. The town was named after Ancram (now Ancrum), Scotland.

Ancram is in the southeastern corner of the county.

== History ==
Prior to European colonization, the area had been occupied for thousands of years by varying indigenous cultures. Historic Native American nations included the Mahican and Wappinger.

Recorded as part of the land grant to the Livingston family, this area on the Roeliff Jansen Kill was originally called "Livingston Forge" after the iron foundry developed on the river. Throughout the eighteenth century, the Livingston forge created metal products for the community. The town was sometimes known as "Scotchtown" due to the immigrants of Scottish ancestry who flocked there in the late 18th century. As the Revolution drew near, the factory produced shot, cannonballs, and perhaps most importantly, the huge chain that was installed across the Hudson River at West Point as a defense against British ships going upriver. The "Fort Montgomery Chain" was worked up in 1776 at the Ancram foundry and placed across the Hudson River near West Point between Fort Montgomery and Fort Clinton. On October 6, 1777, British forces attacked the two forts, choosing to outflank the forts on land rather than test the strength of the chain directly. It is believed that the chain was confiscated by the British forces when they retreated from the fort several weeks later. Its whereabouts is unknown but one prominent British historian surmises it was shipped to Gibraltar to defend shipping in that British colony.

After the Revolution, the town was established from part of the town of Livingston in 1803, and was then called "Gallatin". In 1814, the name was changed to "Ancram", after the town in Scotland where the Livingstons had their origins. Part of Ancram was taken to form a new town of Gallatin in 1830.

Mining of iron and lead was important in the early economy; the town of Ancramdale was originally known as "Ancram Lead Mines".

The hamlet of Boston Corner was formerly part of Massachusetts. Because it was more accessible from Ancram, it was annexed by the New York town on April 13, 1857, by an agreement between the states.

== Geography ==
According to the United States Census Bureau, the town has a total area of 42.7 square miles (110.7 km^{2}), of which 42.5 square miles (110.0 km^{2}) is land and 0.27 square miles (0.7 km^{2}), or 0.61%, is water. Most of the town is drained by the Roeliff Jansen Kill and its tributary, Punch Brook. The Roeliff Jansen Kill flows west to the Hudson River. The southeastern corner of the town drains to Webatuck Creek, which flows south to the Ten Mile River and thence to the Housatonic River in Connecticut.

The eastern town line is the border of Massachusetts and of Dutchess County. The southern town line also borders Dutchess County.

== Demographics ==
Historical population
Census	Pop.	Note	%±
1820	3,147		—
1830	1,533		−51.3%
1840	1,770		15.5%
1850	1,569		−11.4%
1860	1,720		9.6%
1870	1,793		4.2%
1880	1,602		−10.7%
1890	1,332		−16.9%
1900	1,238		−7.1%
1910	1,137		−8.2%
1920	1,015		−10.7%
1930	850		−16.3%
1940	1,005		18.2%
1950	925		−8.0%
1960	1,080		16.8%
1970	1,215		12.5%
1980	1,332		9.6%
1990	1,510		13.4%
2000	1,513		0.2%
2010	1,573		4.0%
2020	1,440		−8.5%
U.S. Decennial Census 2020

=== 2000 ===
As of the census of 2000, there were 1,513 people, 595 households, and 430 families residing in the town. The population density was 35.5 inhabitants per square mile (13.7/km^{2}). There were 823 housing units at an average density of 19.3 per square mile (7.5/km^{2}). The racial makeup of the town was 97.69% White, 1.06% African American, 0.13% Native American, 0.13% Asian, and 0.99% from two or more races. Hispanic or Latino of any race were 0.93% of the population.

There were 595 households, out of which 30.4% had children under the age of 18 living with them, 58.7% were married couples living together, 8.6% had a female householder with no husband present, and 27.6% were non-families. 20.5% of all households were made up of individuals, and 8.1% had someone living alone who was 65 years of age or older. The average household size was 2.54 and the average family size was 2.91.

In the town, the population was spread out, with 22.4% under the age of 18, 5.7% from 18 to 24, 26.5% from 25 to 44, 28.3% from 45 to 64, and 17.1% who were 65 years of age or older. The median age was 42 years. For every 100 females, there were 104.7 males. For every 100 females age 18 and over, there were 99.3 males.

The median income for a household in the town was $45,726, and the median income for a family was $47,708. Males had a median income of $31,196 versus $25,625 for females. The per capita income for the town was $22,541. About 5.1% of families and 7.4% of the population were below the poverty line, including 5.4% of those under age 18 and 12.0% of those age 65 or over.

== Communities and other locations ==
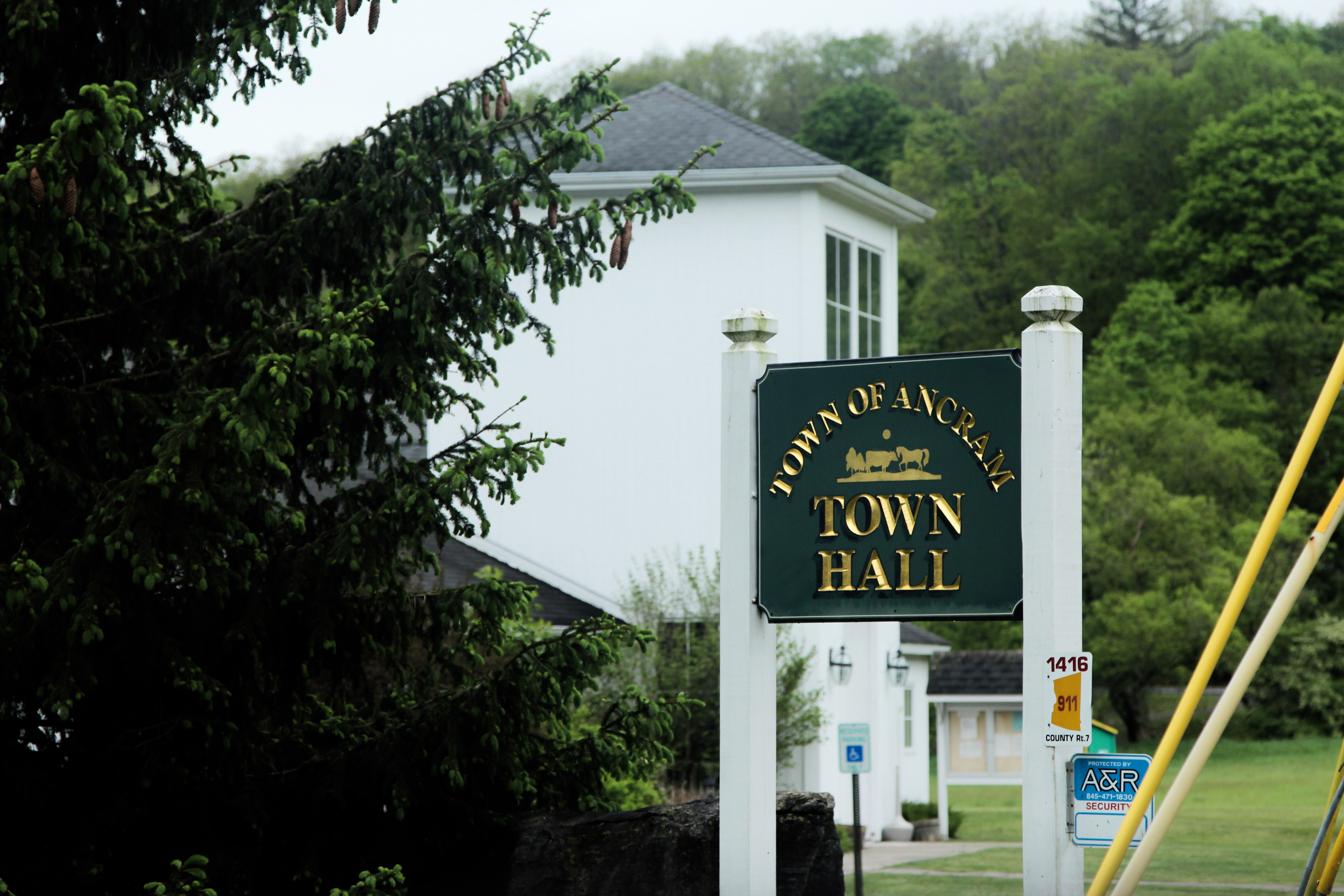
Ancram Town Hall

- Ancram — The hamlet of Ancram is in the western part of the town on New York State Route 82 and County Route 7.
- Ancramdale — A hamlet southeast of Ancram village.
- Boston Corner — A hamlet of Ancram which was formerly in Massachusetts. The community is adjacent to the Massachusetts border.
- Taconic State Park — Part of the park is in the northeastern part of the town.
- Weed Mines — A location by the northern town line.

== See also ==
- List of towns in New York
