= Millerton, New York =

- Village
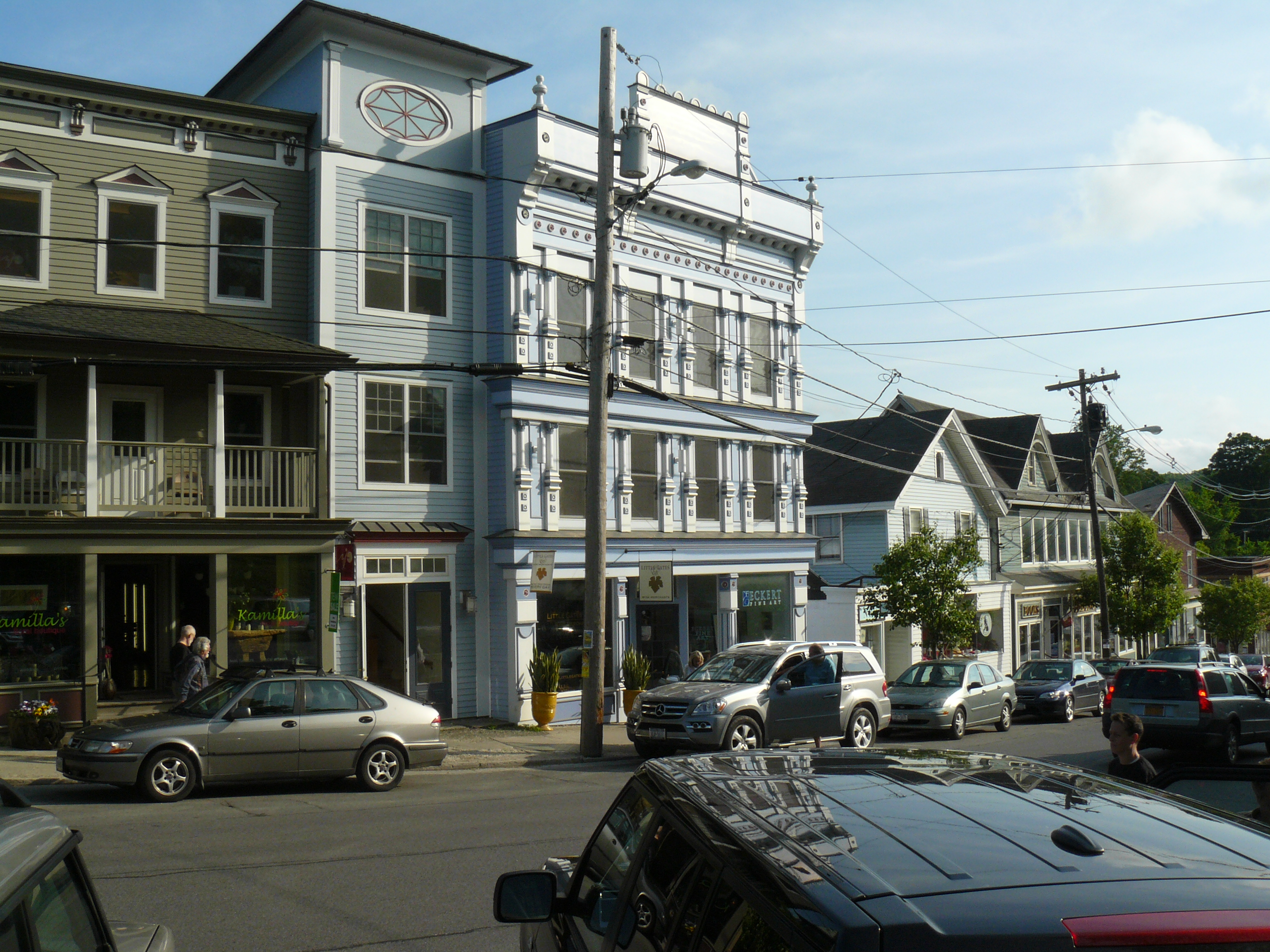
- Business district in Millerton

- Location of Millerton, New York
- Coordinates: 41°57′14″N 73°30′28″W
- Country: United States
- State: New York
- County: Dutchess
- Town: North East
- Incorporated: 1875

Area
  - Total: 0.62 sq mi (1.60 km^{2})
  - Land: 0.62 sq mi (1.60 km^{2})
  - Water: 0.0039 sq mi (0.01 km^{2})
- Elevation: 709 ft (216 m)

Population (2020)
  - Total: 903
  - Density: 1,465.0/sq mi (565.64/km^{2})
- Time zone: UTC-5 (EST)
  - Summer (DST): UTC-4 (EDT)
- ZIP code: 12546
- Area codes: 518, 838
- FIPS code: 36-47361
- GNIS feature ID: 0957337
- Website: villageofmillerton-ny.gov

Millerton is a village in Dutchess County, New York, United States with a population of 903 at the 2020 census. The village was named after Sidney Miller, a rail contractor who helped bring the railroad to that area.

Millerton is part of the Kiryas Joel–Poughkeepsie–Newburgh metropolitan area of New York as well as the larger New York metropolitan area.

Millerton is within the town of North East and is near Taconic State Park and the Connecticut border.

== History ==
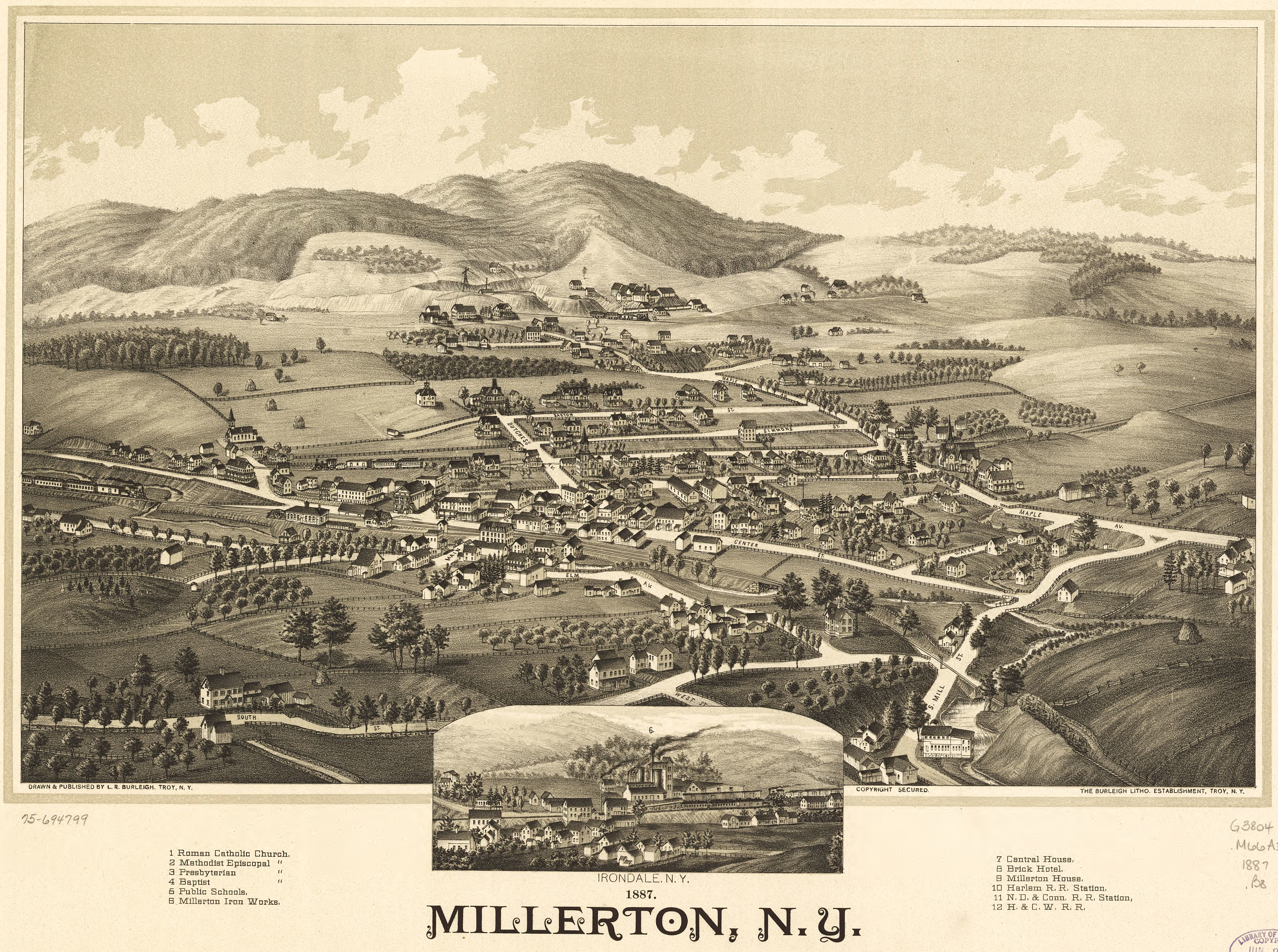
Lithograph of Millerton from 1887, with inset depiction of Irondale, New York and a list of landmarks

The community of Millerton formed after 1851, and the village was incorporated in 1875.

=== Irondale ===
The Millerton Iron Company established itself nearby in an area known as Irondale and was served by a telegraph address in Millerton. The foundry had two Cooper hot blast stoves and produced car-wheel pig iron (cast iron for railcar wheels) with a 12,000 ton capacity in 1890. The plant was established in 1854 and by 1882 employed approximately 150 people. Irondale was served by a general store, a company owned grist mill, and a post office. A historical marker commemorates the Irondale Cemetery (List of New York State Historic Markers in Dutchess County, New York).

=== Economic cycle and development ===
Millerton's history was explored in the 2011 New York Times article "Williamsburg on the Hudson" from the perspective of a lifelong-citizen, Phil Terni, who had lived in Millerton for more than 65 years. Terni described the Millerton of its early, prosperous period as "an agricultural crossroads with three hotels served by three railroads," and characterized the more recently revived Millerton as "a rural village with urban influences from nearby towns and boroughs,” as exemplified by the vibrant arts, culture, and new small businesses along U.S. Route 44.

== Geography ==
Millerton is located in northeastern Dutchess County. According to the United States Census Bureau, the village has a total area of 0.62 square miles (1.6 km^{2}), of which 0.00 square miles (0.01 km^{2}), or 0.50%, is water.

The closest rail station is now Wassaic station to the south. The town formerly had its own station on the Harlem Line.

Historical population
Census	Pop.	Note	%±
1880	600		—
1890	638		6.3%
1900	802		25.7%
1910	858		7.0%
1920	829		−3.4%
1930	910		9.8%
1940	953		4.7%
1950	1,048		10.0%
1960	1,027		−2.0%
1970	1,042		1.5%
1980	1,013		−2.8%
1990	884		−12.7%
2000	925		4.6%
2010	958		3.6%
2020	903		−5.7%
U.S. Decennial Census

== Demographics ==
As of the census of 2000, there were 925 people, 375 households, and 232 families residing in the village. The population density was 1,470.4 inhabitants per square mile (567.7/km^{2}). There were 412 housing units at an average density of 654.9 per square mile (252.9/km^{2}). The racial makeup of the village was 76.51% White, 2.27% African American, 0.32% Native American, 1.30% Asian, 0.11% Pacific Islander, 1.41% from other races, and 1.08% from two or more races. Hispanic or Latino of any race were 19% of the population.

There were 375 households, out of which 29.3% had children under the age of 18 living with them, 45.3% were married couples living together, 12.5% had a female householder with no husband present, and 38.1% were non-families. 32.0% of all households were made up of individuals, and 14.4% had someone living alone who was 65 years of age or older. The average household size was 2.44 and the average family size was 3.09.

In the village, the population was spread out, with 24.4% under the age of 18, 8.3% from 18 to 24, 27.8% from 25 to 44, 24.0% from 45 to 64, and 15.5% who were 65 years of age or older. The median age was 40 years. For every 100 females, there were 88.8 males. For every 100 females age 18 and over, there were 89.9 males.

The median income for a household in the village was $36,176, and the median income for a family was $46,458. Males had a median income of $27,279 versus $29,500 for females. The per capita income for the village was $17,220. About 7.7% of families and 14.3% of the population were below the poverty line, including 24.7% of those under age 18 and 12.0% of those age 65 or over.

== Arts and culture ==
The North East Community Center Farmer's Market runs every Saturday from May–October and every other Saturday from November–April.

The Oakhurst Diner is a staple landmark for the local community and tourists. Well known for its locally sourced ice cream.

The Millerton MovieHouse is a local hotspot for cheap tickets and frequent showings.

The village has a number of art galleries, artist studios, and antique shops. The NorthEast-Millerton Library, located on Main Street, hosts a variety of art shows throughout the year, as well as concerts during the summer.

The community is served by the weekly newspaper The Millerton News.

== Notable people ==
- Eddie Collins, Hall of Fame baseball player for the Chicago White Sox and the Philadelphia Athletics
- Daryl Hall, singer-songwriter and founder of Daryl's House
- Sandy Berger, United States national security advisor under Bill Clinton
