= Mellenville station =

Historic train station in Mellenville, New York, U.S.

Mellenville
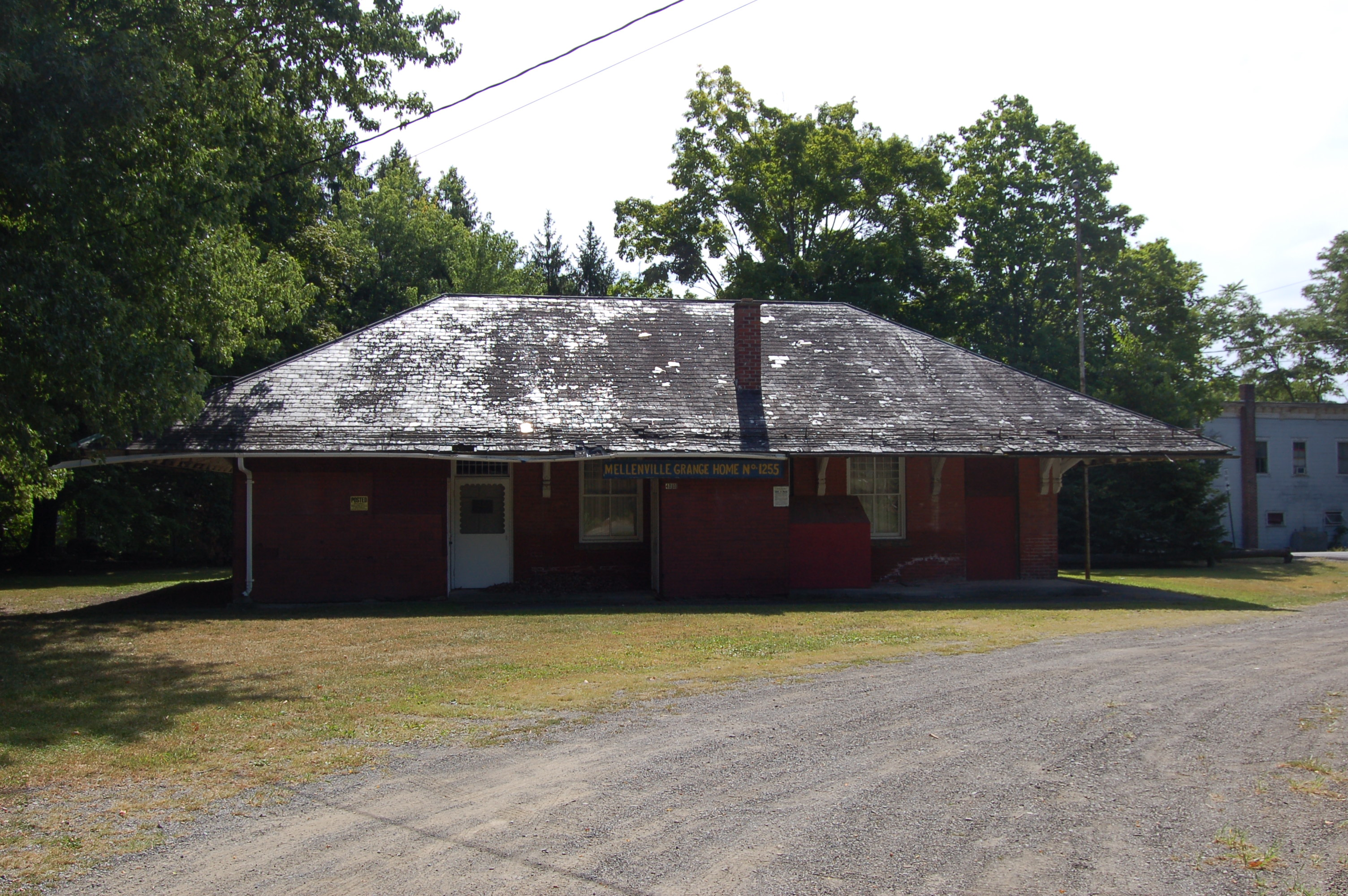

General information
- Location: Route 217, Mellenville, Columbia County, New York 12544
- Line: Hudson Branch

Former services
Preceding station	New York Central Railroad	Following station
Pulvers toward Hudson	Hudson Branch	Ghent toward Chatham
- Mellenville Railroad Station
- U.S. National Register of Historic Places
- Location within New York Location within the United States
- Location: NY 217, Mellenville, New York
- Coordinates: 42°15′11″N 73°40′5″W
- Area: less than one acre
- Built: 1900
- Architectural style: Queen Anne
- NRHP reference No.: 00001120
- Added to NRHP: September 29, 2000
Location

Mellenville, now known as Mellenville Grange, is a historic train station and Grange located in the hamlet of Mellenville, in the town of Claverack in Columbia County, New York. It was built in around 1900 by the Boston and Albany Railroad on their Hudson Branch. It is a one-story brick building with a slate covered hipped roof. It features heavy wood and scroll-sawn brackets that support the roof overhang. Also on the property is a contributing privy. The building ceased to be used as a station in the 1930s, when it was acquired by the Grange.

It was listed on the National Register of Historic Places in 2000 as the Mellenville Railroad Station.
