= Taconic Hills Central School District =

School district in Craryville, New York, United States

Taconic Hills School District
- 73 County Route 11A Craryville, New York, US, 12521

District information
- Superintendent: Neil Howard Jr
- Chair of the board: Bonnie Torchia

Students and staff
- Athletic conference: Patroon
- District mascot: Titan
- Colors: Orange & white

The Taconic Hills Central School District is a rural school district in the upstate town of Craryville, New York, United States with about 1600 students. It serves all or part of the communities of Copake, Hillsdale, Philmont, Ancram, Austerlitz, Claverack, Gallatin, Ghent, Livingston, Mellenville, Northeast and Taghkanic in the southeastern part of Columbia County, New York, United States. The district covers nearly 250 sq mi (650 km^{2}).

== District history ==
The original formal public schools of Columbia County were one room school houses. Many of them were established under the 1812 Common School Act. However, in the 1920s politicians identifying with the Progressive Movement began scrutinizing the one-room school house educational system. These politicians advocated a change to larger, more centralized schools, which they felt would provide more equal educational opportunities for all. When in 1932 the Roeliff Jansen Central School District formed it was made up of twenty-nine smaller districts. It became the largest school district up to that time. In 1947, the Ockawamick Central School District was created from fifteen of these small, rural school districts. Taconic Hills Central School District was formed in 1970 after the unification of the Roeliff Jansen and Ockawamick School Districts, two smaller districts. The School District maintained two locations - a K-5, and 9-12 class campus in the former Ockawamick building in Claverack, and a K-8 class campus located in the Roeliff Jansen building in Hillsdale.

In 1989 The Taconic Hills Football team won the New York State Class C Championship with a record of 11–0.

In 2000, faculty, administrators and students moved into a new state of the art, centralized K-12 school building in Craryville.

== Campus building and facilities ==
The Taconic Hills Central School opened in fall 1999 after years of debate about the district's facilities plan and a fast-track design and construction process that took just a year and a half. The $50 million school encompasses 350,000 square feet, making it one of the largest schools in the state of New York. The design, created by Rhinebeck Architecture & Planning in Rhinebeck, New York, is designed for a capacity of 2,000 students in K-12. The design groups the K-grade 2 and grades 3-6 units on one side and the grades 7-8 and grades 9-12 units on the other. The entry to each side features a two-story atrium, which helps orient students to their location in their wing. A community center is situated between the two school wings. The facility includes a 1,000-seat performing arts center that opens to an outdoor amphitheater (the two share a common stage), two media centers, an aquatic/fitness center, and three subdividable gymnasiums with stadium-style seating. The original quote of 759 interior and exterior doors included 276 interior and exterior hollow-metal doors. In mid-project, the school district received a donation that allowed for the addition of the aquatic/fitness center. Taconic Hills Central School has won several national, regional and state awards, including the prestigious Learning by Design 2001 Citation Award from the National School Boards Association. The Taconic Hills district also hosts many visitors from other districts who come to study the facility and borrow ideas for their own schools. However, the current student population of about 1,600 means the campus was designed too large by about 25 percent, pointing to a costly flaw in projecting the size of the student body in the near future.

== Schools ==
The district operates the following schools in a single campus in Craryville:

- Taconic Hills High School
- Taconic Hills Elementary School
