= Ghent station (New York Central Railroad) =

Ghent
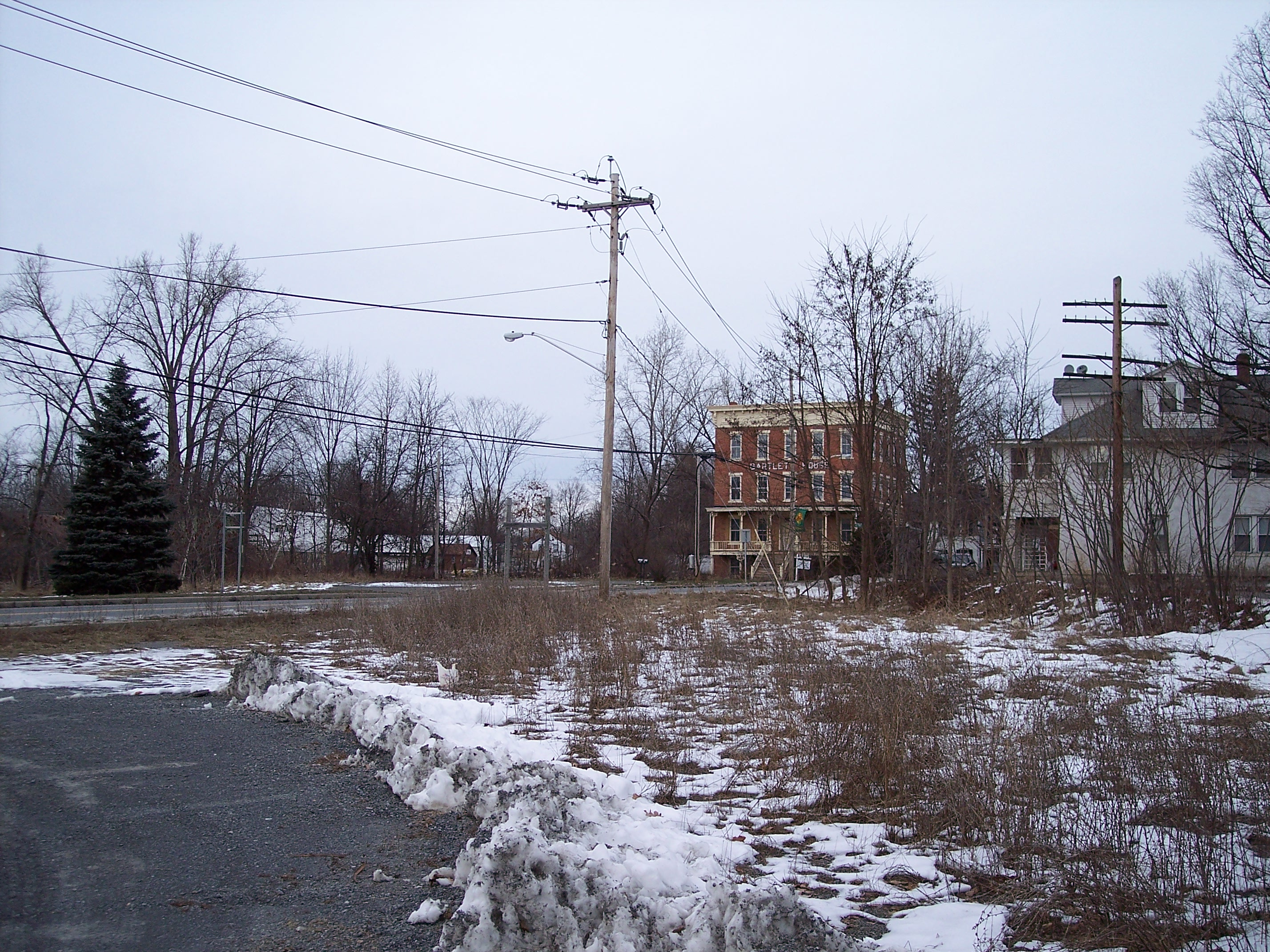
- General location of former station. Note the former railroad hotel which is on the National Register of Historic Places.

General information
- Location: New York State Route 66 and Railroad Avenue; Ghent, New York, 12075
- Coordinates: 42.3270°N 73.6187°W
- Tracks: 0

History
- Opened: May 10, 1852

Former services
Preceding station	New York Central Railroad	Following station
Philmont toward New York	Harlem Division	Chatham Terminus
Mellenville toward Hudson	Hudson Branch	Payn's toward Chatham
Location

The Ghent station was a former New York Central Railroad station that served the residents of Ghent, New York.

== History ==
The station catered to a local community that had a substantial industry during the era of the NYCRR, and, earlier, the New York and Harlem Railroad. Prior to this, however, another railroad laid tracks through the community nearby: specifically, the Hudson and Berkshire Railroad, which was completed in 1846 between Hudson and Chatham It went bankrupt and was reorganized as the Hudson and Boston Railroad in 1855: later acquired by the Boston and Albany Railroad in 1870, which eventually downgraded it to the B&A Hudson Branch. The New York and Harlem laid tracks through Ghent to Chatham in 1852. The line was eventually taken over by the New York Central Railroad (NYCRR), and provided both passenger and freight train service. Ghent was the station that served both the Harlem Division and the former Boston and Albany Railroad Hudson Branch. The station had a tower that coordinated the two railroads from here to Chatham Union Station until 1936. It also included a hotel named The Bartlett House, which was built in 1870 and has been listed on the National Register of Historic Places since May 8, 2012.

However, with the demise of the NYCRR, and its 1968 merger with the Pennsylvania Railroad to form the soon to be bankrupt Penn Central Railroad, passenger services ceased on March 20, 1972. Ghent provided commercial freight-only service, and even became a terminus for freight when Conrail acquired the line in 1976 and eliminated it between here and Millerton station in Dutchess County. The station continued to do so until 1980, when the tracks between here and Chatham Union Station were dismantled. The Harlem Valley Rail Trail Association plans to extend the trail along the right-of-way in front of the site of the former station.
