= Philmont station (New York Central Railroad) =

Philmont
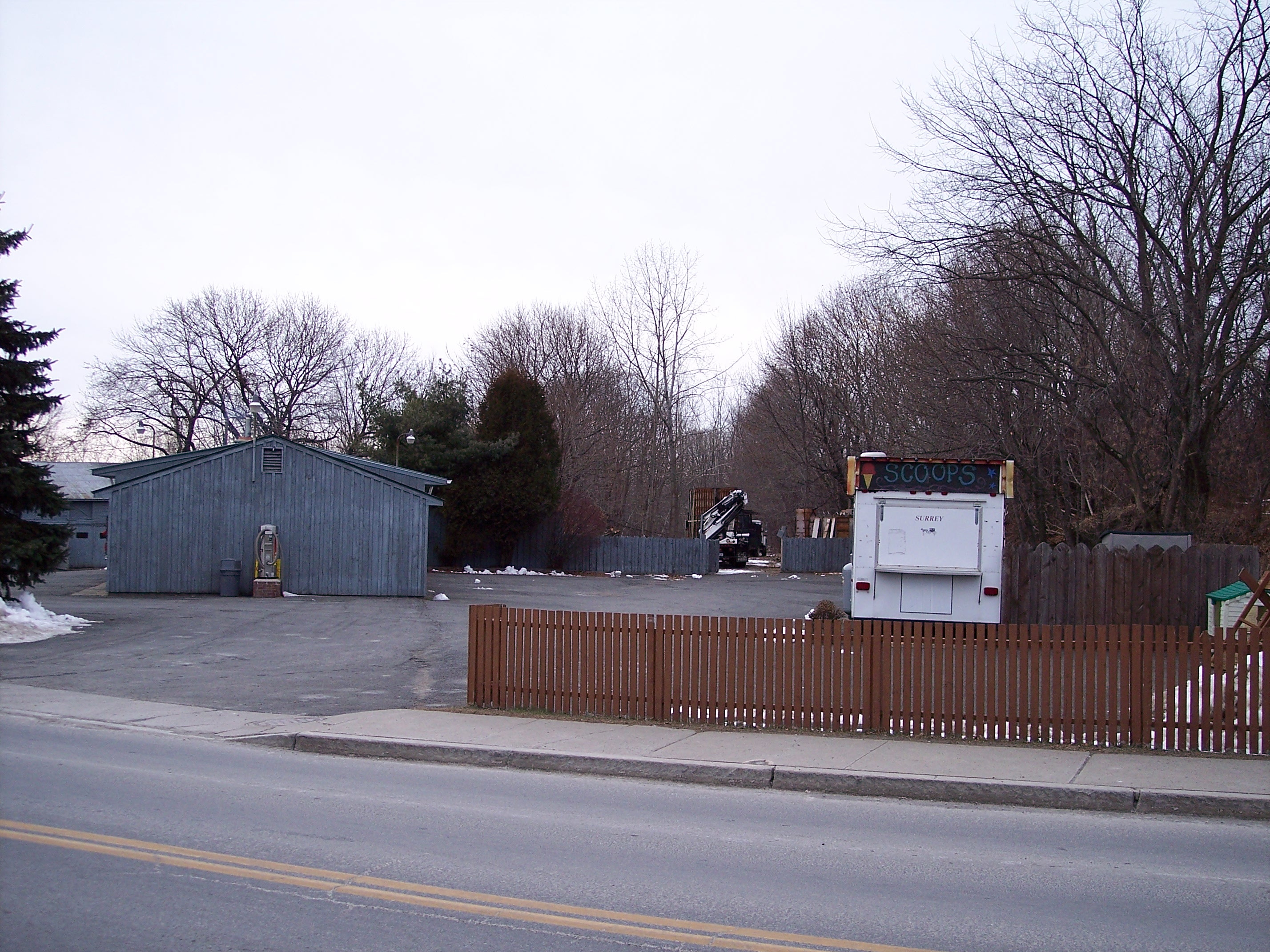
- Former train station was in the general location of the building across the street.

General information
- Location: Main Street (NY 217) near Railroad Avenue; Philmont, New York, 12513
- Coordinates: 42.2509°N 73.6440°W
- Tracks: 0

History
- Opened: May 10, 1852
- Closed: March 20, 1972 (passenger service); March 27, 1976 (freight)
- Rebuilt: 1910

Key dates
- May 1959: Station agent eliminated

Former services
Preceding station	New York Central Railroad	Following station
Martindale toward New York	Harlem Division	Ghent toward Chatham
Location

The Philmont station was a former New York Central Railroad station that served the residents of Claverack, New York.

== History ==
The New York and Harlem Railroad built their main line through Philmont up to Chatham in 1852, with the line opening on May 10, 1852 The station catered to a local community that had a substantial industry during the 19th and early 20th Centuries. The line provided both passenger and freight train services. The station was acquired by the New York Central and Hudson River Railroad in 1864 and eventually taken over by the New York Central Railroad, who also built a railroad hotel called The Empire House in the 1880s, and a new station in 1910.

On June 21, 1895, the station agent at Philmont, Harry Krooz, 43, along with his assistant, George Jacobi, 62, were found dead in the station depot. The conductor of the New York–Chatham train (no. 7) found the station depot locked (a departure from standard operation procedure) and saw Krooz and Jacobsia's bodies locked in the office. The railroad called for a local doctor, but they were declared deceased. Reports were that Krooz, a member of the railroad since 1869, was to be dismissed and an auditor was on his way to complete the transaction. No report was made at the time on why Jacobsia was also found dead. However, it was later discovered that Krooz shot Jacobsia (his father-in-law), then took his own life. Krooz was also found to be procrastinating at his job, requiring the replacement of a new agent was who on the train that discovered their dead bodies.

As with most of the Harlem Line, the merger of New York Central with Pennsylvania Railroad in 1968 transformed the station into a Penn Central Railroad station. However, with the demise of the Harlem Division passenger service on March 20, 1972, the station was closed for passengers and provided freight only services. Philmont provided commercial freight services until 1976, when the tracks north of Wassaic were dismantled. The former Empire House has been an American Legion Hall since 1948. The Harlem Valley Rail Trail Association plans to extend the trail along the right-of-way in front of the site of the former station.
