= Taconic Hills High School =

Location
- 73 County Route 11A; Craryville, Columbia County, New York 12521; United States
- 42.1711°N 73.6011°W

Information
- School district: Taconic Hills Central School District
- Superintendent: Neil Howard Jr
- Principal: Lisa Cardillo
- Teaching staff: 57.02 (FTE)
- Grades: 7–12
- Student to teacher ratio: 11.12
- Colors: Orange and White
- Athletics conference: Patroon
- Mascot: Titan
- Website: https://www.taconichills.k12.ny.us/page/jrsr-high-school/

Taconic Hills High School is a secondary school in Craryville, New York, United States operated by Taconic Hills Central School District. It serves all or part of the communities of Copake, Hillsdale, Philmont, Ancram, Austerlitz, Claverack, Gallatin, Ghent, Livingston, Northeast and Taghkanic in the southeastern part of Columbia County, New York, United States.

The high school is located on a campus in Craryville NY which is also used by Taconic Hills Elementary School.

== Notable alumni ==
- Imelda Muller- Class of 2009. Physician, former United States Navy officer, and NASA astronaut prospect.
