= Philmont (disambiguation) =

Philmont Scout Ranch is the Boy Scouts high adventure base in New Mexico.

Philmont may also refer to:

- Philmont Kanik, the Winter camping program at Philmont Scout Ranch
- Philmont Scout Ranch camps, a list and description of all camps at Philmont Scout Ranch
- Philmont Philbreak, an alternative Spring break program for Order of the Arrow members
- Philmont (band), a Christian rock music band
- Philmont, New York, the village in New York state
- Philmont (NYCRR station), a former railway station in the New York town of the same name
- Philmont (SEPTA station), a SEPTA commuter railway station in Lower Moreland Township, Pennsylvania
