= Copake Falls station =

Former railroad station in New York, US

Copake Falls
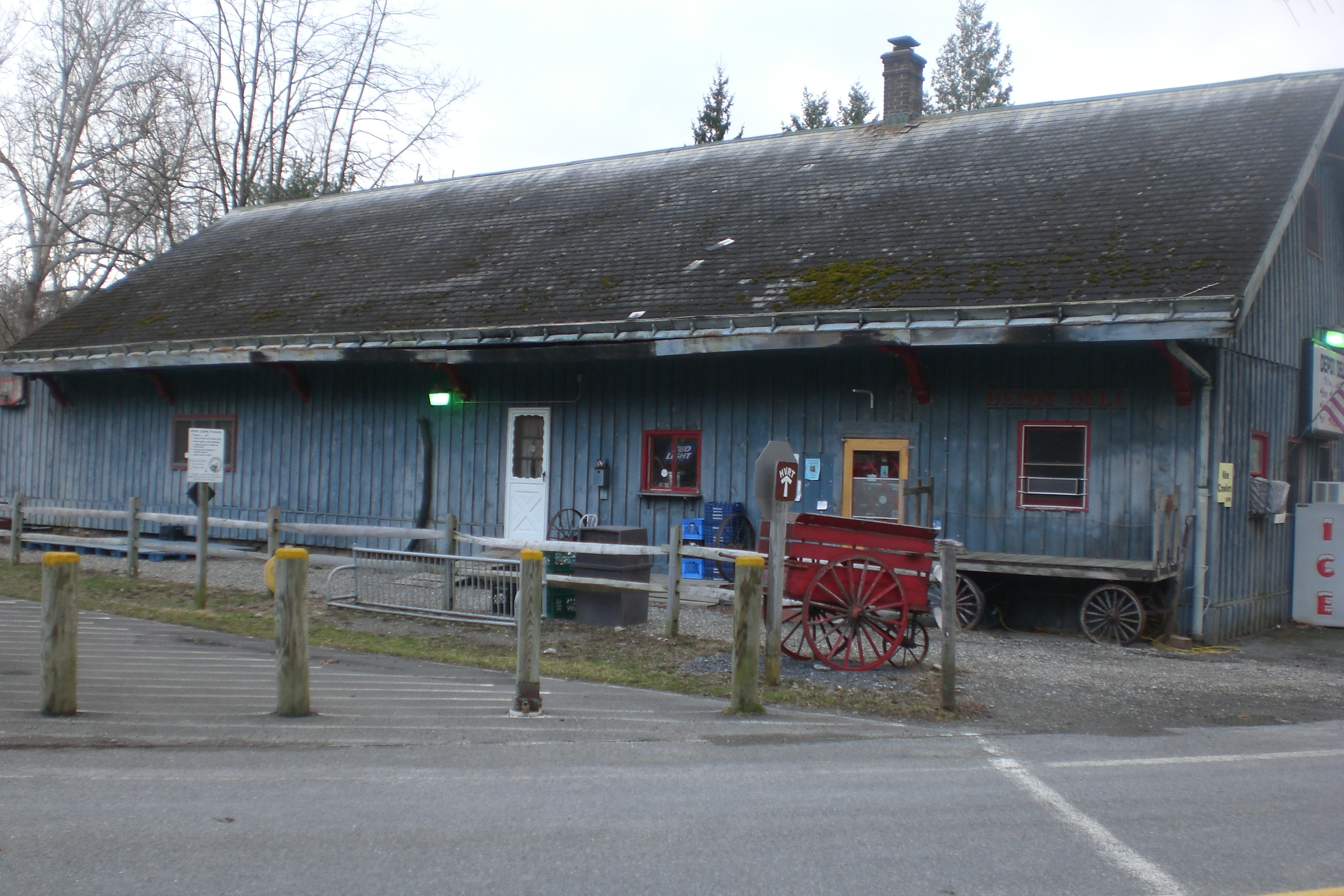
- Copake Falls station in March 2009.

General information
- Location: 64 Miles Road, Copake Falls, New York 12516
- Coordinates: 42.1206°N 73.5204°W
- Tracks: 0

History
- Opened: May 10, 1852
- Closed: March 20, 1972
- Former names: Copake Iron Works (????–1920)

Key dates
- June 29, 1959: Station agent eliminated

Former services
Preceding station	New York Central Railroad	Following station
Boston Corners toward New York	Harlem Division	Hillsdale toward Chatham
Location

The Copake Falls station was a former New York Central Railroad station that served the residents of Copake, New York.

== History ==
The station catered to a local community that was served by the New York & Harlem Railroad, later the Harlem Division of the New York Central Railroad. The railroad between Dover Plains (to the south) and the end of the line at Chatham (to the north) was constructed between 1848 and 1852. The current train station was built in 1905.

In 1968, the station and the railroad became part of Penn Central. After a tumultuous court battle, passenger service north of Dover Plains to Chatham came to an end on March 20, 1972, and the station was closed (although a clause in the building's lease states that if passenger service ever resumes, space must be provided in the building for a waiting area). The tracks were then only used by freight trains sporadically until that service ended in 1976. The rails were removed in 1981, and the right of way was converted into a rail trail in the 1990s.

The building currently houses a small, seasonal convenience store, catering primarily to visitors to the nearby Copake Falls portion of Taconic State Park and nearby Bash Bish Falls. It is also near the Copake Iron Works Historic District.
