= Martindale station (New York Central Railroad) =

Martindale
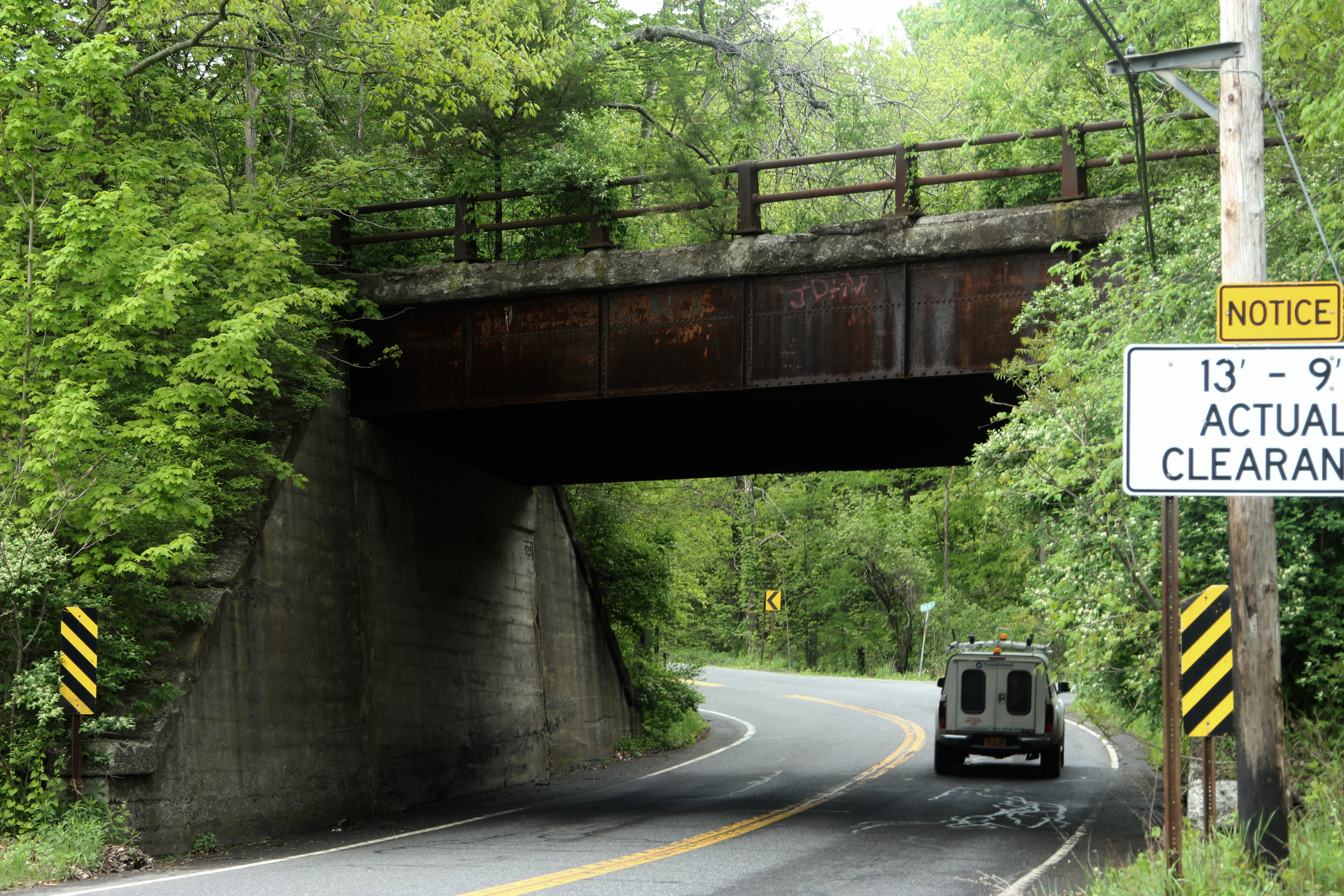
- The bridge over CR 11 near the former site of the Martindale NYCRR station.

General information
- Location: 1733 Columbia County Route 11; Hillsdale, New York, 12529
- Coordinates: 42.207811°N 73.629084°W

History
- Opened: May 10, 1852

Former services
Preceding station	New York Central Railroad	Following station
Craryville toward New York	Harlem Division	Philmont toward Chatham
Location

The Martindale station was a former New York Central Railroad station that served the residents of Hillsdale, New York and was the next stop on the Harlem Division after Craryville.

== History ==
The New York and Harlem Railroad built their main line through Martindale between 1848 and 1852, after community founder John Martin persuaded the railroad to run their line through the community. The train station was originally opened in 1852, when the line operated to Chatham, New York, and catered to a local community that had a substantial industry during the era of the NYCRR. The line provided both passenger and freight train services.

Some spectacular accidents in the early 20th century, led to a grade elimination project in 1929, the first within Columbia County. In 1946, the station was demoted to a flag stop, and was bought by an employee of the Harlem Division in 1949, who dismantled the wooden depot and used the wood to build his house in Philmont.

With the demise of the Harlem Division passenger service on March 20, 1972, the station was closed for passengers and provided freight only services. Martindale provided commercial freight services until 1976, when the tracks north of Wassaic were dismantled. The Harlem Valley Rail Trail Association plans to extend the trail along the right-of-way in front of the site of the former station.

== See also ==
- New York Central Railroad
- New York and Harlem Railroad
