= Hogeboom =

Hogeboom is a Dutch surname anglicized from "Hoogenboom", meaning; a tall tree, a compounding of hoog meaning "high, tall" and boom meaning "tree". Notable people with the surname include:

- Gary Hogeboom (born 1958), American football player
- Gregory Hogeboom (born 1982), Canadian ice hockey player
- Henry Hogeboom (1809–1872), American judge
- John T. Hogeboom (1816–1886), American farmer, lawyer, and politician

== See also ==
- Stephen Hogeboom House
