= Hillsdale station =

Hillsdale station can refer to the following train stations:

- Hillsdale station (Caltrain), California
- Hillsdale station (NJ Transit), New Jersey
- Hillsdale station (New York Central Railroad), New York, now closed
