= Stephen Storm House =

Historic house in New York, United States

- U.S. National Register of Historic Places
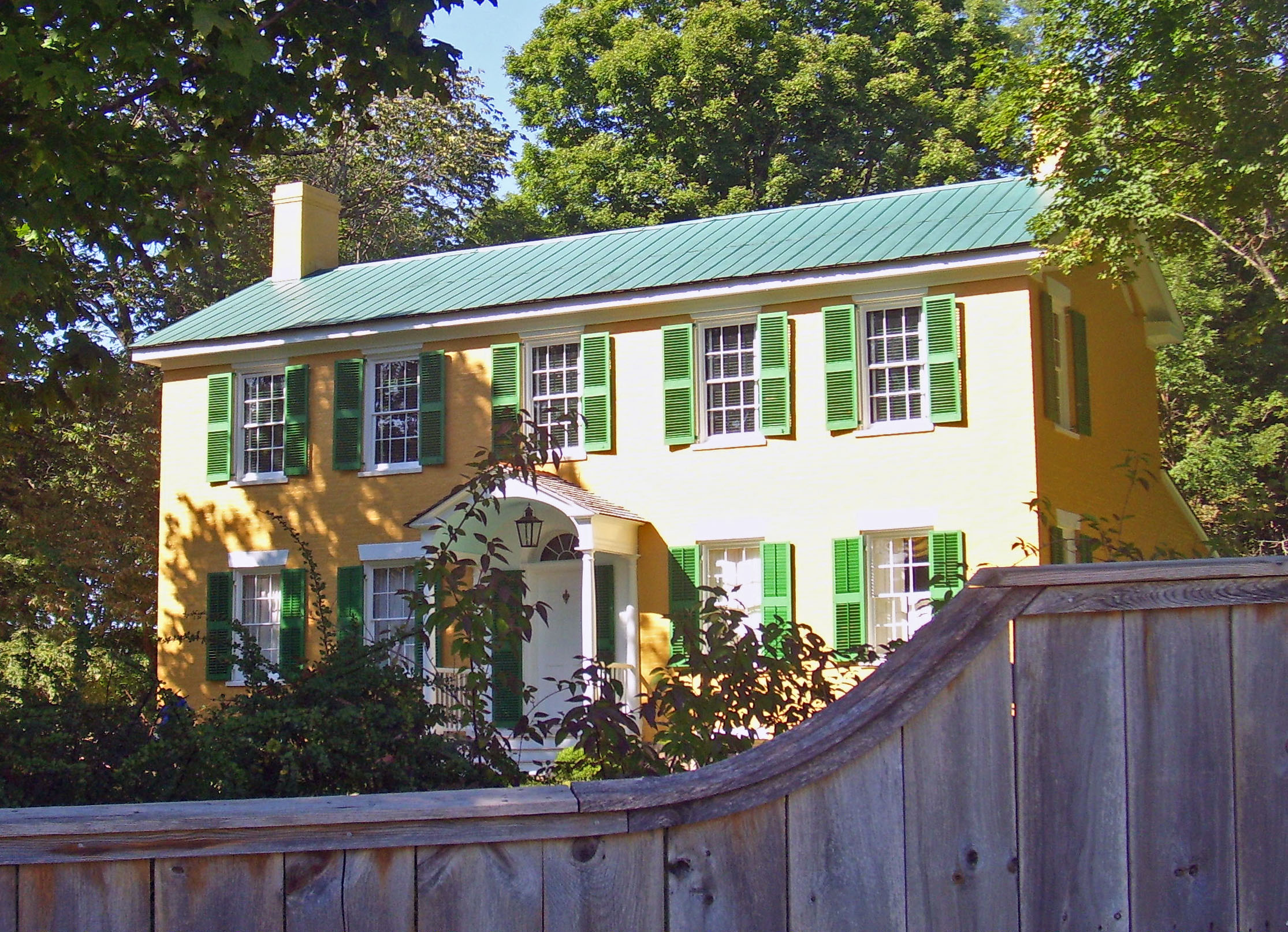
- South elevation and east profile, 2008

- Location within New York Location within the United States
- Interactive map showing the location of Stephen Storm House
- Location: Claverack, NY
- Nearest city: Hudson
- Coordinates: 42°13′35″N 73°42′53″W
- Area: 3.6 acres (1.5 ha)
- Built: ca. 1810
- Architectural style: Federal
- MPS: The Architectural and Historic Resources of the Hamlet of Claverack, Columbia County, New York
- NRHP reference No.: 97001616
- Added to NRHP: January 7, 1998

The Stephen Storm House is located on the NY 217 state highway just east of Claverack, New York, United States. It is a Federal style brick house built in the early 19th century.

It combines aspects of that style found in urban and rural houses, and has a richly detailed interior that remains intact. In 1997 it was listed on the National Register of Historic Places.

== Property ==
The property is a 3.6-acre (1.5 ha) lot on the north side of Route 217, one-quarter mile (500 m) east of where it splits from NY 23. The house is set back slightly from the road, behind a wooden fence. A small stream separates the house from the remaining foundations of two barns that have since burned down. They are both considered contributing resources to its historic character. A long driveway forks at the ruins of one barn, with the east fork leading to the house. There limestone blocks remaining from the days when visitors arrived by carriage flank the end of the long walk to the front entrance.

Around it, the land gently slopes upward to the east. There are similar older houses on larger, semi-wooded lots to the east and west. Across the road is a large cultivated field that rises to the south.

The house itself is a two-story, five-by-one-bay brick building on a stone foundation topped with a seamed metal roof. A brick wing extends from the northwest corner. Alongside and behind it are a complex of sheds that have been combined into a modern kitchen and workshop.

On the south (front) facade all windows have louvered shutters. A boxed cornice marks the roofline. A columned portico, similar to the one on the Dr. Abram Jordan House one mile (1.6 km) west on Route 23, shelters the main entrance, itself in a molded frame flanked by shuttered sidelights and topped with a stone round-arched lintel.

The east and west sides both have one window apiece on each story. In the east end this is complemented by an unusual pointed elliptical window in the garret. The wing on the north end has been complemented with a newer, two-story wing and several additions.

A narrow central hall is behind the six-paneled main door. Around the doors to the parlors on either side are original wooden moldings. Each step on the three-run staircase has a carved fan design on the side. They are topped with a cherry Federal-style bannister. At the rear of the hall a small stair leads to the rear wings.

Both parlors have their original finishings, including interior shutters and fireplace. The east one is more ornate, with its door having applied molded leadwork in addition to detailed moldings and carvings. The mantel has a deep cornice with a central rectangle containing a molded strip and floral center motif. It is flanked by two smaller plain rectangles with a fluted strip beneath. The fireplace sides have fluted columns, with the square ends of the mantel shelf protruding overhead.

A door to the smaller room to the rear is flanked by pilasters. It is topped with a cornice centered on a sunburst carving, with rosettes at the ends. It, too, has molded leadwork highlights. The ceiling of this room is molded plaster with an oval molding and center medallion.

There is similar decoration in the western parlor, but without the doorway cornices. Next to its fireplace is an original china closet. The door leads to the west entry to the house.

This vestibule leads to the rear wing of the house. The original kitchen wing has a reconstructed fireplace and original Dutch door. It has a bedroom in its upper story.

The bedrooms on the second floor are similar in layout and size to the rooms below. They, too, have intricate original detail, although not as extensive. The east bedroom's mantel is flanked by molded pilasters and a deep cornice. There are no interior shutters.

== History ==
The Storm family emigrated to the New Netherland colony from the Brabant region in the mid-17th century. Originally settling in Brooklyn, descendants worked their way up the Hudson Valley, serving in various public capacities as the region went to English and later British and American control. Stephen Storm was born around 1788, the son of Judge Thomas Storm, who may have located in Claverack from Stormville, in Dutchess County. In later years Thomas was a Judge, and resided in a large frame house about two miles to the east.

In 1807 Stephen married Catherine Phillips, who was entitled to a dowers share to a quarter of the traditional Johannes Phillips leasehold from the Van Rennselaer patroonship dating from the 1760s. The couple presumably settled in the original late 18th century three-bay brick house which appears in the same location on the Penfield rents map (1806). The house was built around 1810, the year in which Stephen gave his father in law a $10,000 mortgage. The house was constructed on an expanded footprint covering five bays and a small ell extending to the rear. Some of the structural materials used in building the federal home were salvaged from the earlier structure, including floor joists sawn from finished Dutch style ceiling beams, and floor boards resawn from old wide yellow pine flooring.

The Storms had five children. Catherine died in 1819.

Federal style houses were common at the time. The Storm House pairs a common size for rural applications of the style with some features more frequently found in urban Federal houses, such as the narrow central hall and shallow depth with single-story rear additions. Its interiors are among the most richly decorated of any house from the period in Columbia County.

The house is related to other Claverack federal residences in terms of layout, and interior trim details, including refined fluting on stair spandrels similar to those found in the James Vanderpoel house (House of History), Plumb-Bronson mansion, and another privately owned Claverack house. The east front parlor features related fluting in the overdoor panels.

The front facade was laid in Flemish bond and finished with lead-tucked 'grapevining'. The rest of the structure is laid in common English bond with ordinary jointing. ' In 1817 Storm bought the 150 acres (61 ha) opposite the house for his farming operations from Jacob R. Van Rensselaer, a descendant of the area's original Dutch manorial family who still had considerable landholdings in the area and was active in local politics as a state assemblyman, serving as speaker of that body and later New York's Secretary of State. Storm himself would serve as an assemblyman for a single term in the early 1820s.

In 1839, Storm moved to nearby Hudson and sold the house to an Andrew Pulver after his wife died. The Pulver family raised the rear addition's roof, the only significant change made since its construction. They lived there until Andrew died around 1900. Other owners of note include John Delafield, a Livingston family descendant and resident of Montgomery Place, who considered preserving the house during the 1970s.

== See also ==
- National Register of Historic Places listings in Columbia County, New York
