= Craryville station =

Craryville
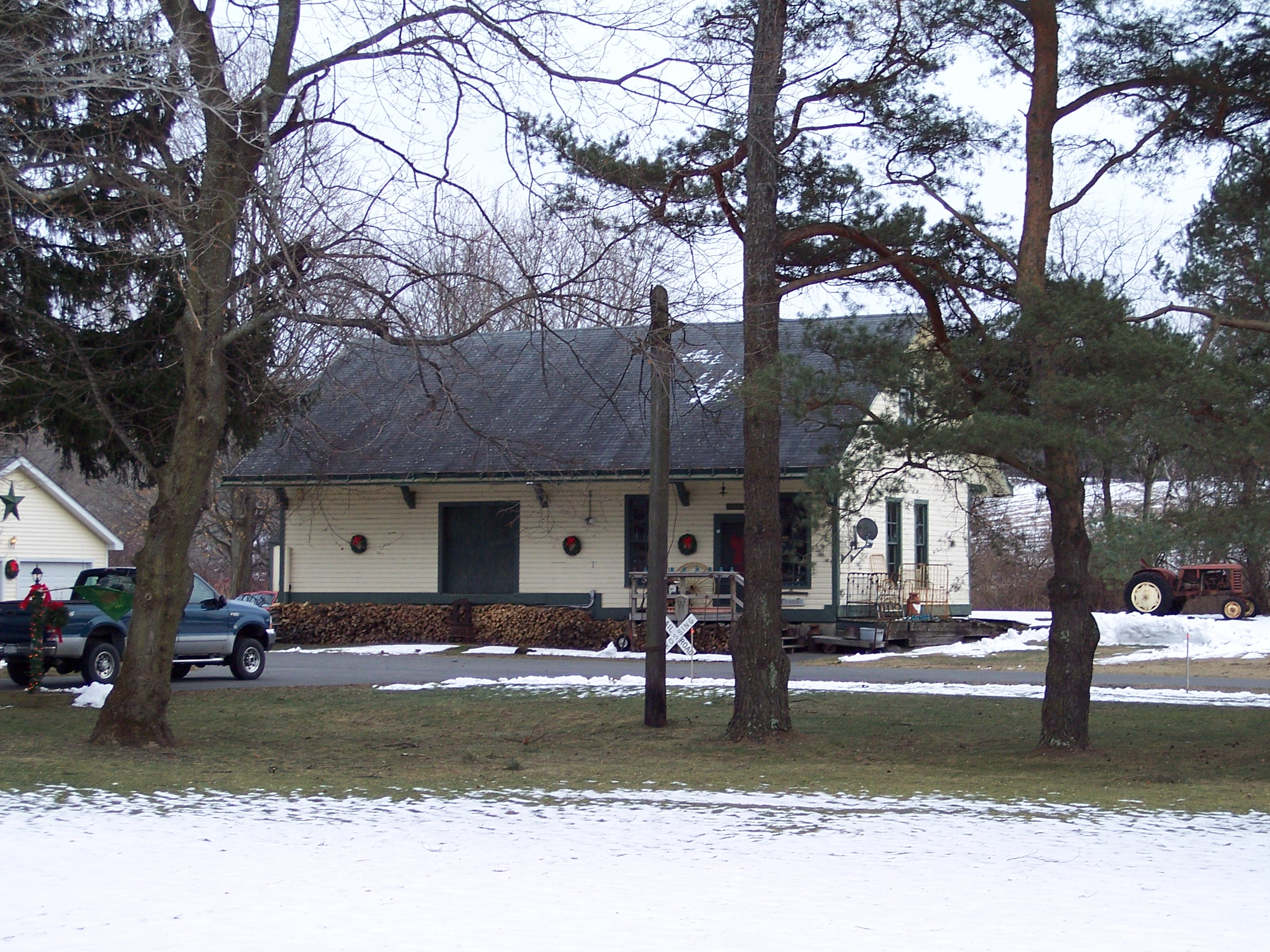
- Former station

General information
- Location: 1810 State Route 23, Craryville, Copake, New York 12521
- Coordinates: 42.174727°N 73.580221°W

History
- Opened: May 10, 1852
- Closed: March 20, 1972 (passenger service); March 27, 1976 (freight)
- Former names: North Copake (1852–)

Former services
Preceding station	New York Central Railroad	Following station
Hillsdale toward New York	Harlem Division	Martindale toward Chatham
Location

The Craryville station was a former New York Central Railroad station that served the residents of Copake, New York. It is currently located along New York State Route 23 in the hamlet of Craryville.

== History ==
The New York and Harlem Railroad built their main line through Craryville between 1849 and 1852 leading to Chatham. It was also intended to be the original northern terminus of the Dutchess and Columbia Railroad. The station catered to a local community that had a substantial industry during the era of the NY&H, and later when the New York Central Railroad (NYCRR) acquired the railroad. The line provided both passenger and freight train services, and even included a high-level freight loading dock.

However, with the demise of the Harlem Division passenger service on March 20, 1972, the station was closed for passengers and provided freight only services. Craryville provided commercial freight services until 1976, when the tracks north of Wassaic were dismantled. The Harlem Valley Rail Trail Association plans to extend the trail along the right-of-way in front of the site of the former station.
