= The Nature Institute =

American nature research institute

Coordinates: 42.265266°N 73.600496°W

- Formation: 1998; 27 years ago
- Headquarters: Ghent, New York
- Board President: Craig Holdrege, Ph.D.
- Website: https://www.natureinstitute.org/

The Nature Institute is a research institute located in Ghent, New York, that was founded in 1998. The Institute offers regular educational programs and has numerous ongoing projects and publications. In 2005, the Institute's publications reached about 10,000 people.

== Publications ==
The institute's newsletter, In Context, published biannually since 1999, features articles addressing central questions concerning the methods of scientific inquiry and the role of technology in society, and presenting the results of biological research based on a phenomenological treatment of the organism as a whole.

The on-line publication NetFuture has received recognition from commentators in the field of technology. Kevin Kelly founding editor of Wired magazine said NetFuture is "the best, most literate, and intelligent critique of technology available. Talbott is honest, bright, and devoted to understanding the role of technology in our lives. He manages to host a conversation around his wonderful essays that actually moves issues forward. Most excellent and highly recommended."

Nature Institute researchers have written numerous books on science and technology, including Beyond Biotechnology: The Barren Promise of Genetic Engineering (Lexington KY: The University Press of Kentucky, 2008). The book received very positive reviews in the press. Michael Pollan, author and UC Berkeley professor, said "Holdrege and Talbott’s analysis of genetic engineering is the smartest, most original, and most compelling I have seen anywhere, in journalism or academia" and the journal Nature Biotechnology said "Under the heading of a 'delicate empiricism' the authors ultimately offer a well-written and engaging attempt at reconstructing just such a context-sensitive approach to biology that can be relevant to our contemporary needs."
