= Harriet Phillips Bungalow =

Historic house in New York, United States

- U.S. National Register of Historic Places
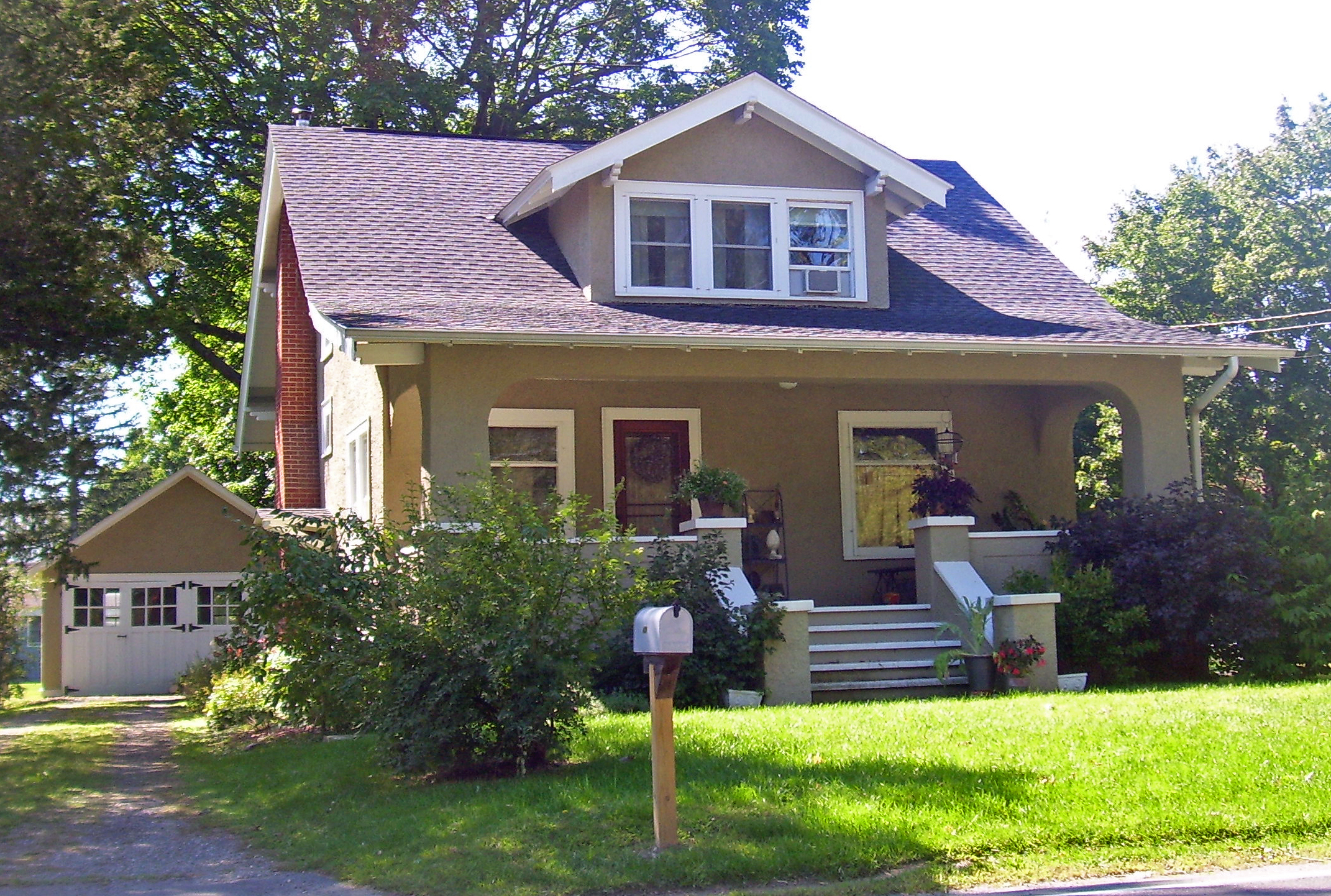
- Garage, left, south profile and east elevation, 2008

- Location within New York Location within the United States
- Interactive map showing the location of Harriet Phillips Bungalow
- Location: Claverack, NY
- Nearest city: Hudson
- Coordinates: 42°13′38″N 73°44′58″W
- Built: 1926
- Architectural style: American Craftsman Bungalow
- MPS: The Architectural and Historic Resources of Claverack
- NRHP reference No.: 97000946
- Added to NRHP: 1997

The Harriet Phillips Bungalow is located on NY 23B on the western edge of Claverack, New York, United States. It is a stucco-sided frame building dating from the 1920s.

A strong example of an American Craftsman Bungalow, it is possible that the house may have been built as a catalog home sold by an Iowa company that preceded Sears in offering full kits that included materials and designs for such homes. In 1997 it was listed on the National Register of Historic Places.

== Property ==
The house is on the eastern side of Route 23B, slightly north of Willmon Road on the opposite side. The property includes a small front lawn. The surrounding neighborhood is residential, with most other houses built in the early or mid-twentieth century. At the lot's southeastern corner is a garage that is similar in style and material to the house. It is considered a contributing resource to the National Register listing.

The bungalow is a one-and-a-half-story frame structure on a foundation of poured concrete. It is faced in stucco. Wide overhanging eaves, supported by occasional paired brackets, mark the line of the side-gabled roof that is shingled in asphalt and pierced by large dormer windows in the front and rear. The other roof lines have similar treatments. A brick chimney rises on the eastern side. The northern (front) facade has a full-length porch with an arched support.

Inside, the front entrance, offset slightly to the east, has a screen door and a beveled-glass front door. The entrance leads into a first floor, which is divided into four large spaces: a front hall with a staircase, living room, dining room, and kitchen. A Tuscan order columned archway leads into the living room from the hall. Double French doors separate the living room from the dining room, which has a bay window on the western wall. The landing between the first floor and the half-story has a stained glass window.

Many original finishes remain. Most reflect the Arts and Crafts styles of the era, particularly the leaded glass in the window panes and the clear slash grain Douglas fir woodwork, especially the full-height kitchen cabinets. Other early twentieth century styles influenced the interior decoration, however. The columned entrance to the living room is a Classical Revival touch, and the turned spindle balusters on the stairway are a sign of lingering Queen Anne influence.

== History ==
Bungalows, small houses with broad, sloping roofs, first became popular in California and then spread to the rest of the country. The Phillips house exhibits a primary characteristic of the form, in the recessed porch, which treats the space as more part of the interior than as an appendage. Aspects further associated with the American Craftsman influence are the broad eaves and the use of stucco as an exterior material.

It is possible that the house may be a catalog house or "kit house", as they also are known, assembled from prefabricated materials that are sold directly to homeowners. While these houses most commonly are associated with Sears, which made most of them between 1908 and 1940, there were other manufacturers.

The Philips bungalow is very similar to a design in the 1923 catalog of another manufacturer, the Gorden-Van Tine Company of Davenport, Iowa, which had preceded Sears in offering a complete package of design and factory-cut materials. Many details and dimensions are identical. The only changes seem to be the elimination of a den on the first floor to allow for a larger bedroom and front hall, and the rearrangement of the staircase and upstairs bathroom to allow for a third bedroom upstairs.

Originally, the roof was covered in cedar shake. The porch had been enclosed soon after construction, but that has been reversed. There have been no other significant changes to the house. It has remained a private residence since it was built.

== See also ==
- National Register of Historic Places listings in Columbia County, New York
