= Bartlett House (Ghent, New York) =

- U.S. National Register of Historic Places
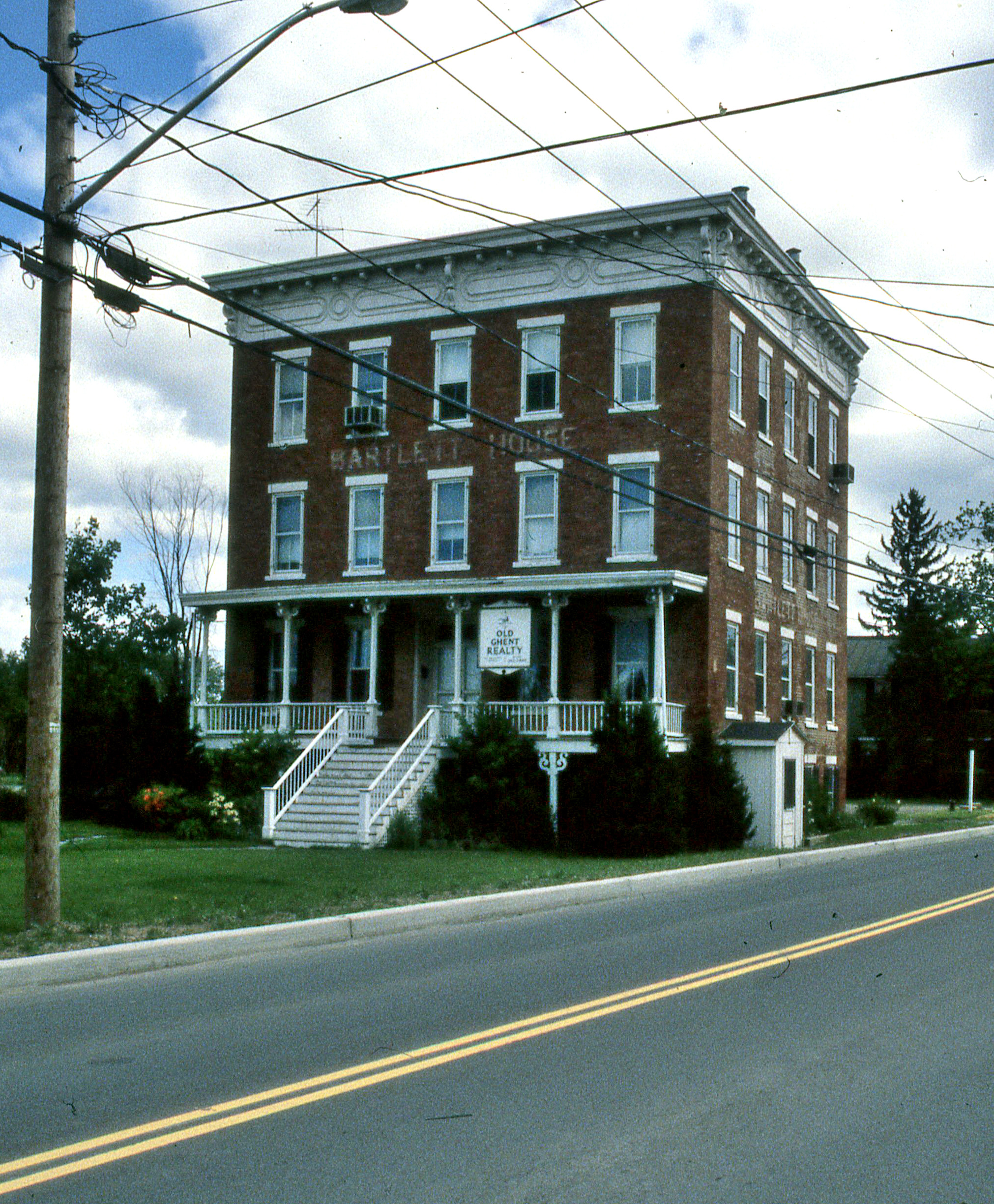
- Bartlett House, February 2015

- Location within New York Location within the United States
- Location: 2258 NY 66, Ghent, New York
- Coordinates: 42°19′37″N 73°37′06″W
- Area: 0.61 acres (0.25 ha)
- Built: c. 1870
- Architectural style: Italianate
- NRHP reference No.: 12000268
- Added to NRHP: May 8, 2012

Bartlett House is a historic railroad hotel which was restored in 2016 to house a kitchen, bakery, and cafe. It was built about 1870, and is a three-story, five bay by five bay, square, Italianate style brick building on a raised basement. It features a full-width front porch at the primary story and decorative cornice. The name BARTLETT HOUSE appears in white lettering between the second and third stories.

== History ==
The Bartlett House was built in 1870 by Ebenezer Bartlett and served as a hotel for railroad travelers. In the mid-1900s, the hotel was the subject of photographs by Walker Evans. The photos were displayed at the Metropolitan Museum of Art in New York. The Bartlett House continued to operate as a railroad hotel for the New York and Harlem and Hudson and Boston Railroads until about 1948. After the rail line was abandoned, the hotel fell into many years of disuse.

In 2012, the Bartlet House was added to the National Register of Historic Places . In 2016, the Barlett House was renovated and is now open to the public as café and bakery.
