= Hawthorne Valley Waldorf School =

Coordinates: 42°16′14″N 73°35′36″W

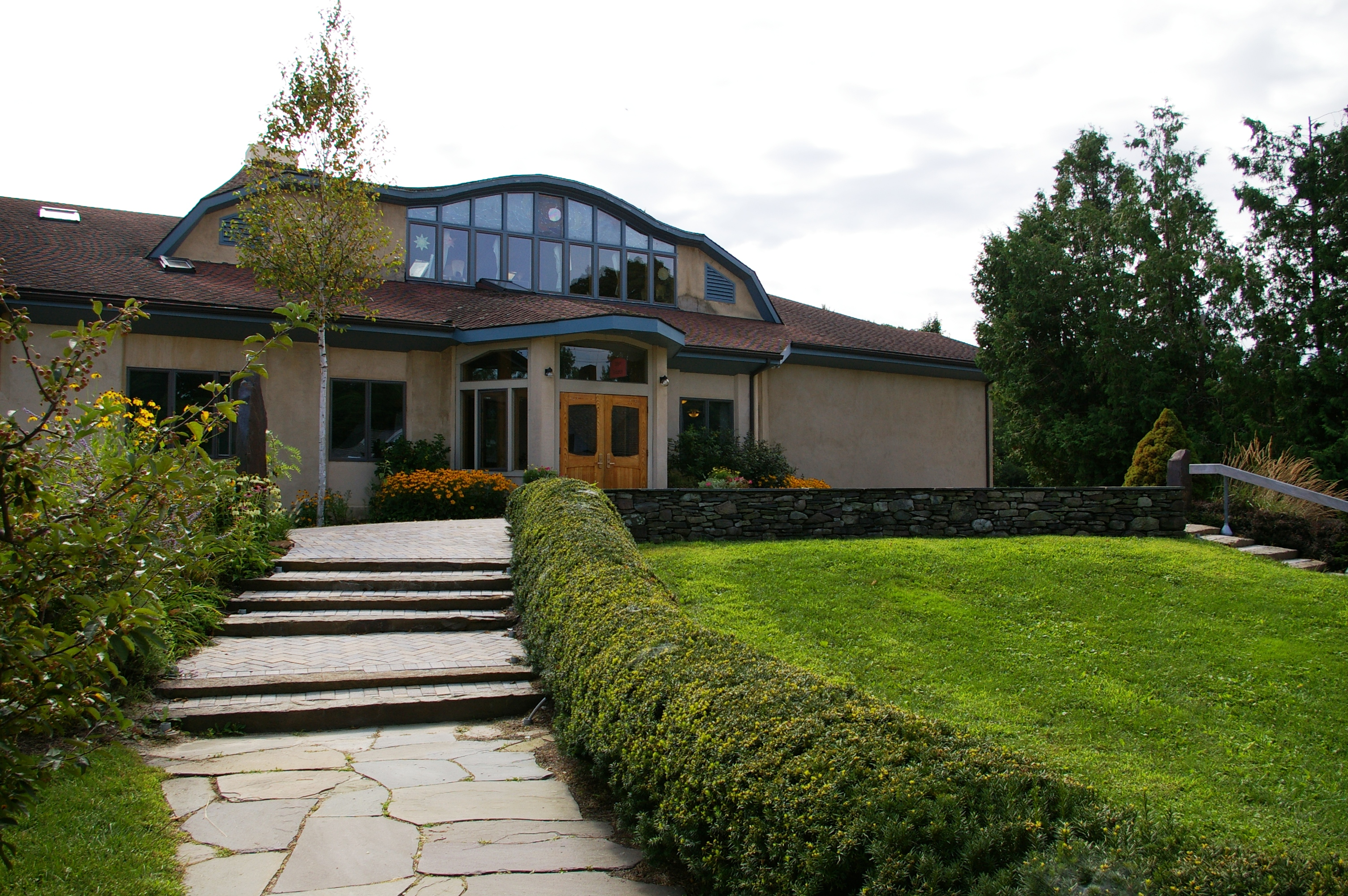

Location
- 327 Route 21C; Ghent, NY; United States

Information
- Type: Co-ed, Private, Waldorf school
- Established: 1973
- Director: Karin Almquist
- Faculty: 38
- Enrollment: 300
- Student to teacher ratio: 8:1
- Campus: Rural, 400 acres
- Colors: Red and blue
- Athletics: Varsity and modified teams
- Website: www.hawthornevalleyschool.org

Hawthorne Valley Waldorf School (HVWS) is an independent co-educational Waldorf day school set in the foothills of the Taconic Mountains in Ghent, Columbia County, New York, USA. The school offers classes from pre-kindergarten to grade 12. It is accredited by the New York State Association of Independent Schools and by the Association of Waldorf Schools of North America.

Founded in 1973, the school is one of the oldest and largest of the approximately 170 independent Waldorf Education schools in North America. The first high school class graduated in 1983.

== Curriculum ==
The school follows an interdisciplinary approach based on the Waldorf curriculum, with an emphasis on English, mathematics and science skills and on art, music and intercultural understanding. The high school curriculum is college preparatory.

Situated on an organic biodynamic farm, all grades at the school have classes that integrate farm science (biology, economics, nutrition) with their curriculum. In 3rd and 9th grade, HVS students spend a week directly learning at the farm.

== Events ==
In February 2026, Hawthorne Valley Waldorf School will host Light Up the Night, a benefit concert at Basilica Hudson featuring Aaron Dessner and friends, Melissa Auf der Maur, Rich Robinson, Joachim Cooder, and others.

The school's annual public events include:

- The Fall Farm Festival (the second Sunday of October)
- The Yuletide Fair (the first Saturday of December)
- The Spring Fair and May Day Celebration (the first Saturday of May)

== Sport ==
HVS competes with public and private schools in cross-country, volleyball and basketball. It also fields club soccer teams for boys and girls.

- In 2008, the HVWS varsity cross-country team won the New York State Class D cross-country championship.
- In 2009, the HVWS varsity cross-country team finished third in the New York State Class D cross-country championship.
