= Hudson and Boston Railroad =

Former railroad

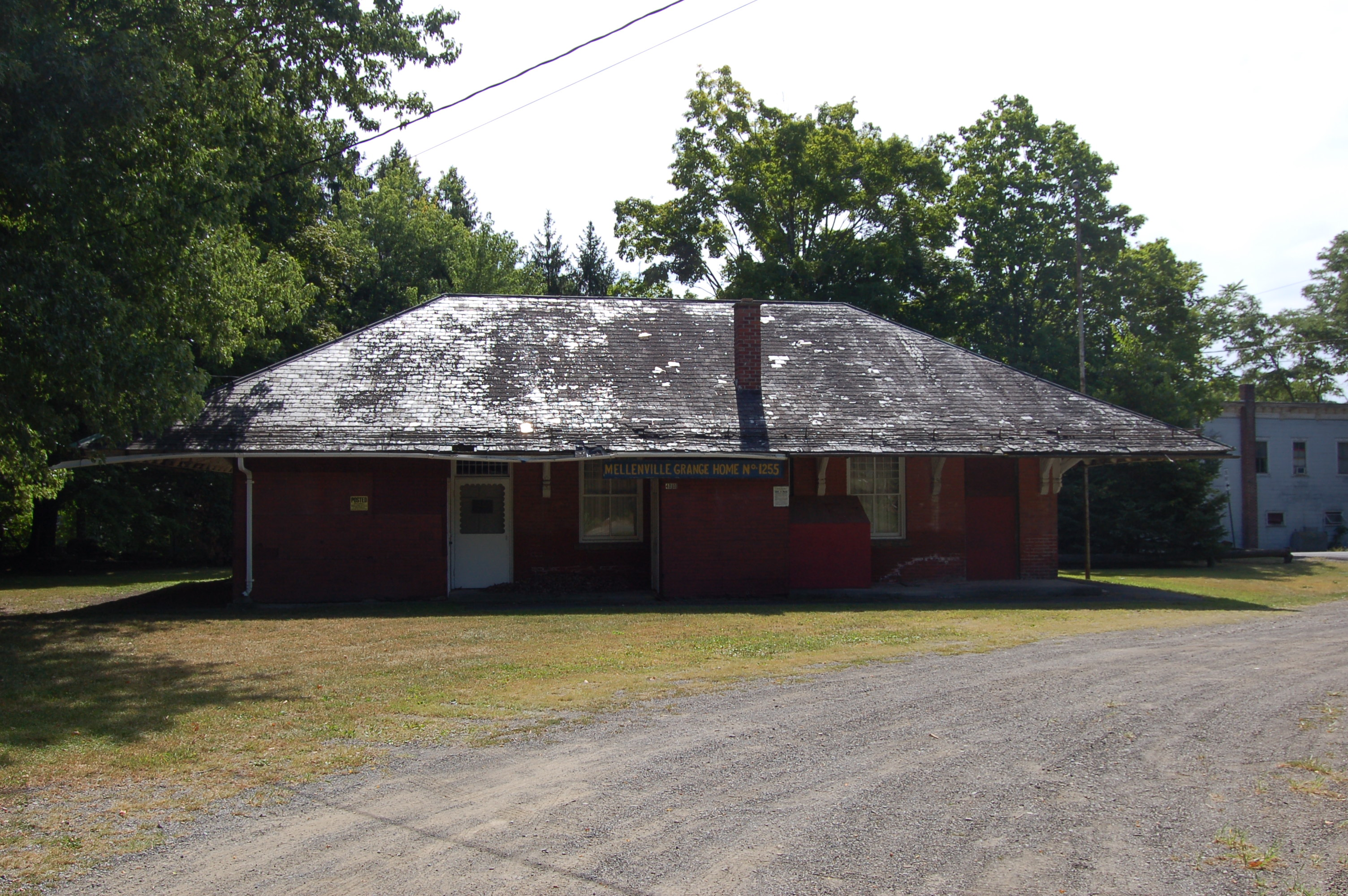
- The former Mellenville station in 2005

Overview
- Locale: Columbia County, New York
- Dates of operation: 1838–c. 1983

Technical
- Track gauge: 4 ft 8 1/2 in (1,435 mm) standard gauge
- Length: 31.5 mi (50.7 km)

The Hudson and Boston Railroad was a railroad that spanned across Southern and Central Columbia County, New York. It was chartered in 1855 and acquired by the Boston and Albany Railroad in 1870, only to face its gradual demise beginning in 1959. Despite its name, it never actually reached Boston, but it did serve as an important connecting line for the Boston and Albany Railroad, which converted it into the B&A Hudson Branch upon acquisition. The line formed a cutoff between the New York Central and Hudson River Railroad towards New York City and the Boston and Albany Railroad, toward Pittsfield, Springfield, Worcester, and Boston.

== History ==
The Hudson and Boston was originally chartered in 1828 as the Hudson and Berkshire Railroad by James Mellen in order to build a railroad line from Hudson, New York to the Massachusetts state line. Construction began in 1835 and was completed in 1838. The company was leased to the Berkshire Railroad, along with the connecting West Stockbridge Railroad, in 1844, but was sold at foreclosure to the Western Railroad of Massachusetts on November 21, 1854. The name was changed to the Hudson and Boston Railroad on February 23, 1855, and the part east of Chatham was abandoned around 1860, since it was redundant with the newer Albany and West Stockbridge Railroad (part of the Boston and Albany Railroad main line).

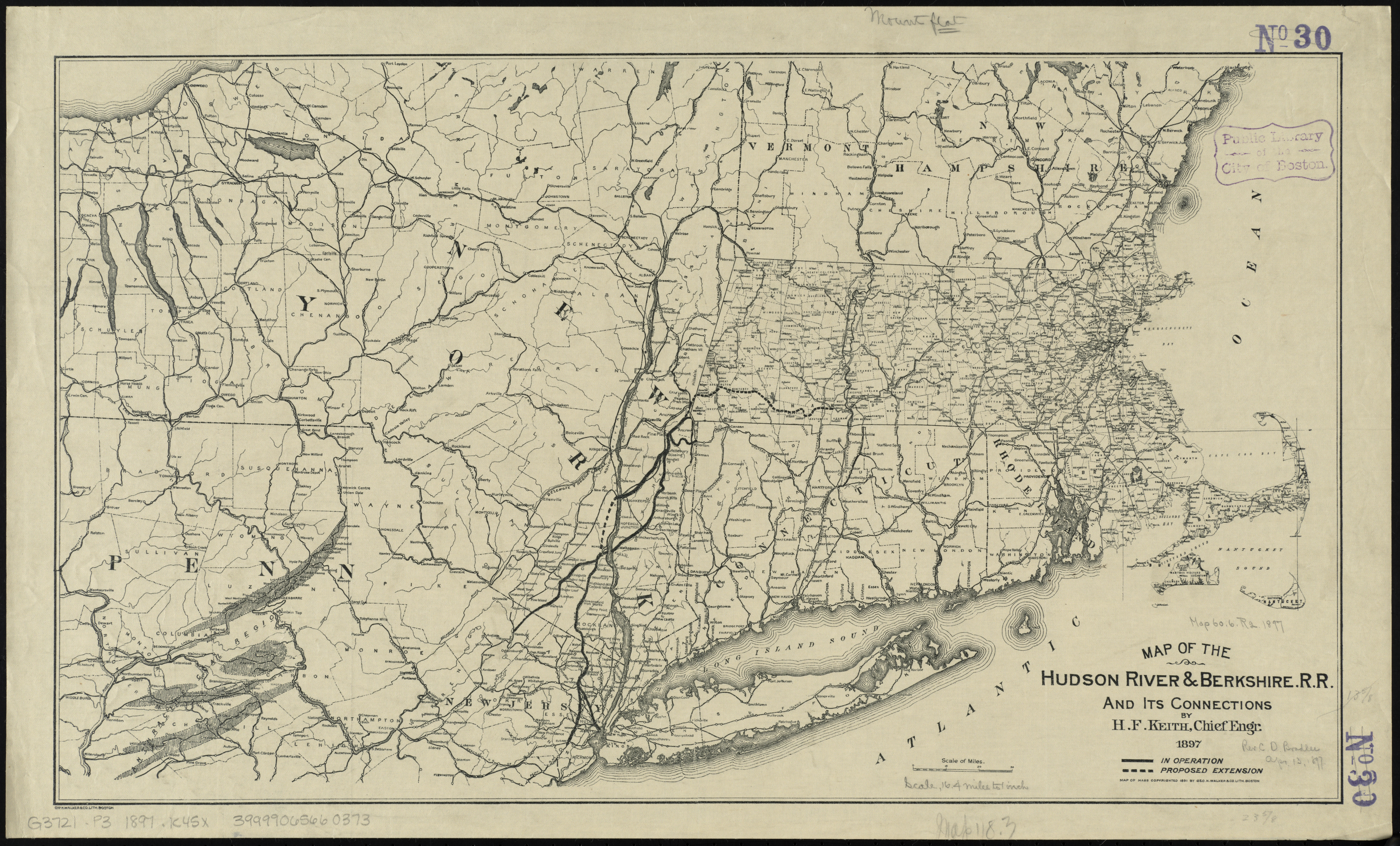
Hudson River & Berkshire Rail Road, 1897

The line was acquired by the B&A on November 2, 1870, and thus became its Hudson Branch, also called the "Hudson and Chatham Branch." It was important both for passengers and for freight services, especially those used by the various mills in the county. In its waning years, the Hudson Branch would serve freight exclusively. In the summer of 1892, an accident took place in Claverack, New York. In 1900, the line along with the B&A itself were acquired by the New York Central Railroad, thereby making Hudson, Harlem, and B&A Main Line work as one with the former H&B. (However, the B&A would run under its own name until 1961.) Passenger service on the line ended on December 21, 1932. In 1936, the "BA" Tower in Ghent which controlled movements between the NYC Harlem Division and the B&A Hudson Branch was closed, and the segment between Ghent and Chatham became exclusively part of the Upper Harlem Division.

Maps from the 1950s still show the line as existing, however, by 1959, it only ran as far east as Claverack. As the NYC merged with the Pennsylvania Railroad in 1968 to form Penn Central Railroad, PC renamed it the "Claverack Secondary Track" and kept cutting the line back farther west, while abandoning all passenger service on its Upper Harlem Division north of Dover Plains. When Conrail took over in 1976, it continued the cutbacks, with the line moving farther west from Claverack, while the UHD segment was abandoned between Millerton and Ghent, transforming it into little more than a freight spur between Ghent and Chatham. That segment would be gone as well by 1983. Today, the only remnant of the line is that of the former Lone Star Cement factory east of Hudson, at a spur off the line once known as "Greenport Center."

== Station list ==
The entire line was in Columbia County, New York

Locality	Station	Lat/long	Notes/Connections
Hudson	Hudson	42.2541°N 73.7977°W	Also served the Hudson River Railroad (NYC). Still used by Amtrak. Wye with NYC Hudson Division.
Hudson	Hudson Upper		Renovated and now the home of a brew pub
Hudson	Albany and Hudson Junction		
Claverack	Claverack		
Claverack	Country Club		Near the present day Columbia Golf and Country Club; Also called "Millers Crossing."
Claverack	Mellenville	42°15′11″N 73°40′5″W	NRHP since September 29, 2000.
Ghent	Pulvers		
Ghent	Ghent	42.3270°N 73.6187°W	Junction with New York and Harlem Railroad (NYC)
Ghent	Payn's		
Chatham	Chatham	42°21′43″N 73°35′49″W	Junction with Boston and Albany Railroad Main Line and Chatham and Lebanon Valley Railroad (Rutland); NRHP since May 1, 1974
