= Hillsdale station (New York Central Railroad) =

Coordinates: 42°10′40″N 73°31′38″W

Hillsdale

General information
- Location: Between Anthony Street Extension, and Railroad Lane; Hillsdale, New York, 12529

History
- Opened: May 10, 1852
- Closed: March 20, 1972 (passenger service); March 27, 1976 (freight)

Former services
Preceding station	New York Central Railroad	Following station
Copake Falls toward New York	Harlem Division	Craryville toward Chatham
Location

The Hillsdale station was a former New York Central Railroad Harlem Division station that served the residents of Hillsdale, New York.

== History ==
The New York and Harlem Railroad built their main line through Hillsdale between 1848 and 1852, and installed a station there. The station catered to a local community that had a substantial industry during that era. The line provided both passenger and freight train services, and was acquired by the New York Central System in 1864. It was frequently used by Edna St. Vincent Millay, who became a local resident in 1925. It was one of the stations on the Harlem Line to serve limited stop trains that went from New York City all the way to Pittsfield, Massachusetts and North Adams, Massachusetts in the Berkshires. Such through trains were replaced by shuttle transfers in 1950.

However, with the demise of the Harlem Division passenger service north of Dover Plains on March 20, 1972, the station was closed for passengers and provided freight only services. Hillsdale provided commercial freight services until 1980, when the tracks north of Wassaic were dismantled.
