= Van Valkenburgh–Isbister Farm =

Historic house in New York, United States

- U.S. National Register of Historic Places
- Location within New York Location within the United States
- Nearest city: Ghent, New York
- Coordinates: 42°19′15″N 73°41′28″W
- Area: 22 acres (8.9 ha)
- Built: 1790
- Architectural style: Greek Revival
- NRHP reference No.: 06000268
- Added to NRHP: April 12, 2006

Van Valkenburgh–Isbister Farm is a historic home and farm complex located at Ghent in Columbia County, New York. The complex is spread over two properties and includes 14 contributing buildings and two contributing structures.

== First property ==
The first property includes the Van Valkenburgh–Isbister farmhouse (c. 1790, with later additions), an 18th-century barn, stable (c. 1850–1880), two wagon sheds (c. 1850–1880), garage (c. 1930), carriage barn and barn (c. 1850–1880), smoke house (c. 1850), outhouse (c. 1900–1925), and gas pump (c. 1930).

== Second property ==
The second property has a dwelling (c. 1840), shed (c. 1875), carriage barn (c. 1875), dwelling / shed (c. 1910), and outhouse (c. 1940). The Van Valkenburgh–Isbister farmhouse consists of a 1 1/2-story rear block dated to about 1790 and a 1 1/2-story front section with Greek Revival detailing dated to about 1845.

It was added to the National Register of Historic Places in 2006.
