= Craryville, New York =

Hamlet in New York, United States

Coordinates: 42°10′29″N 073°34′58″W

Craryville is a hamlet located within the town of Copake in Columbia County, New York, United States. The hamlet is named after the hotelier Peter Crary, who purchased the town's hotel in 1870. Its ZIP code is 12521.

== Education ==
The Taconic Hills Central School District operates the following schools in Craryville:

- Taconic Hills High School
- Taconic Hills Middle School
- Taconic Hills Elementary School

== Notable person ==
- Harold Syrett (1913–1984), president of Brooklyn College

== See also ==
- Craryville (NYCRR station)
