= Henry Hogeboom =

American politician

Henry Hogeboom (February 25, 1809 – September 12, 1872) was a judge who served on the New York Supreme Court from 1858 until his death. Prior to being elected to the bench, Hogeboom served as a member of the New York State Assembly, representing Columbia County.

Hogeboom was the son of John C. and Margaret (Styck) Hogeboom, of Ghent, Columbia Co., N, Y., and was bom at Claverack in that county, Feb. 25th, 1809. He graduated from Yale College in 1827. After completing his academical course, he began the study of law in the office of his brother-in-law, Abraham Van Buren, in Ghent, where he continued until the following spring, when he entered for one year the office of Powers & Day, in Catskill. He was afterwards in the office of Campbell Bushnell, of Hudson, N.Y., and was admitted to the bar in the summer of 1830. From that date he practiced his profession in Hudson until elected a Judge of the Supreme Court of the State in 1857, which office he held at the time of his death. In 1836 he was appointed by Gov. Enos T. Throop Judge of the Court of Common Pleas for his native county, and served for two or three years, when he resigned. In 1839, he was a prominent member of the General Assembly of the State. He received the degree of LL.D. from Rutgers College in 1870.

Judge Hogeboom married, in Nov., 1832, Miss Jane Eliza, daughter of Col. James Rivington, of Poughkeepsie, N. Y. She died March 25, 1858. He died Sept. 12th, 1872, at his residence in Hudson. He had been failing in health for some months, from over-work.

Historian Edward J. Renehan, Jr. has referred to Hogeboom as a "Tammany judge"

This article incorporates public domain material from the Yale Obituary Record.
