= New York State Route 217 =

State highway in Columbia County, New York, US

New York State Route 217
- Map of Columbia County with NY 217 highlighted in red

Route information
- Maintained by NYSDOT
- Length: 6.78 mi (10.91 km)
- Existed: 1930–present

Major junctions
- West end: NY 23 in Claverack–Red Mills
- East end: CR 21C / Taconic State Parkway in Philmont

Location
- Country: United States
- State: New York
- Counties: Columbia

Highway system
- New York Highways; Interstate; US; State; Reference; Parkways
| ← NY 216 | → NY 218 |

New York State Route 217 (NY 217) is a 6.78-mile (10.91 km) long state highway in Columbia County, New York, in the United States. It connects NY 23 in Claverack-Red Mills and the Taconic State Parkway in Hillsdale, providing a shortcut for drivers heading to and from the Rip Van Winkle Bridge and the Taconic State Parkway northwards of Philmont. The entirety of NY 217 is a rural road with only one lane in each direction separated by a double yellow strip.

NY 217 originally extended from Mellenville to NY 22 in the town of Hillsdale when it was assigned as part of the 1930 renumbering of state highways in New York. It was extended west to its present terminus in Claverack in the early 1930s. NY 217 was truncated westward to Harlemville in the mid-1930s, then to the Taconic Parkway in 1980. The former routing of NY 217 is now maintained by Columbia County as County Route 21 (CR 21) and County Route 21C.

== Route description ==
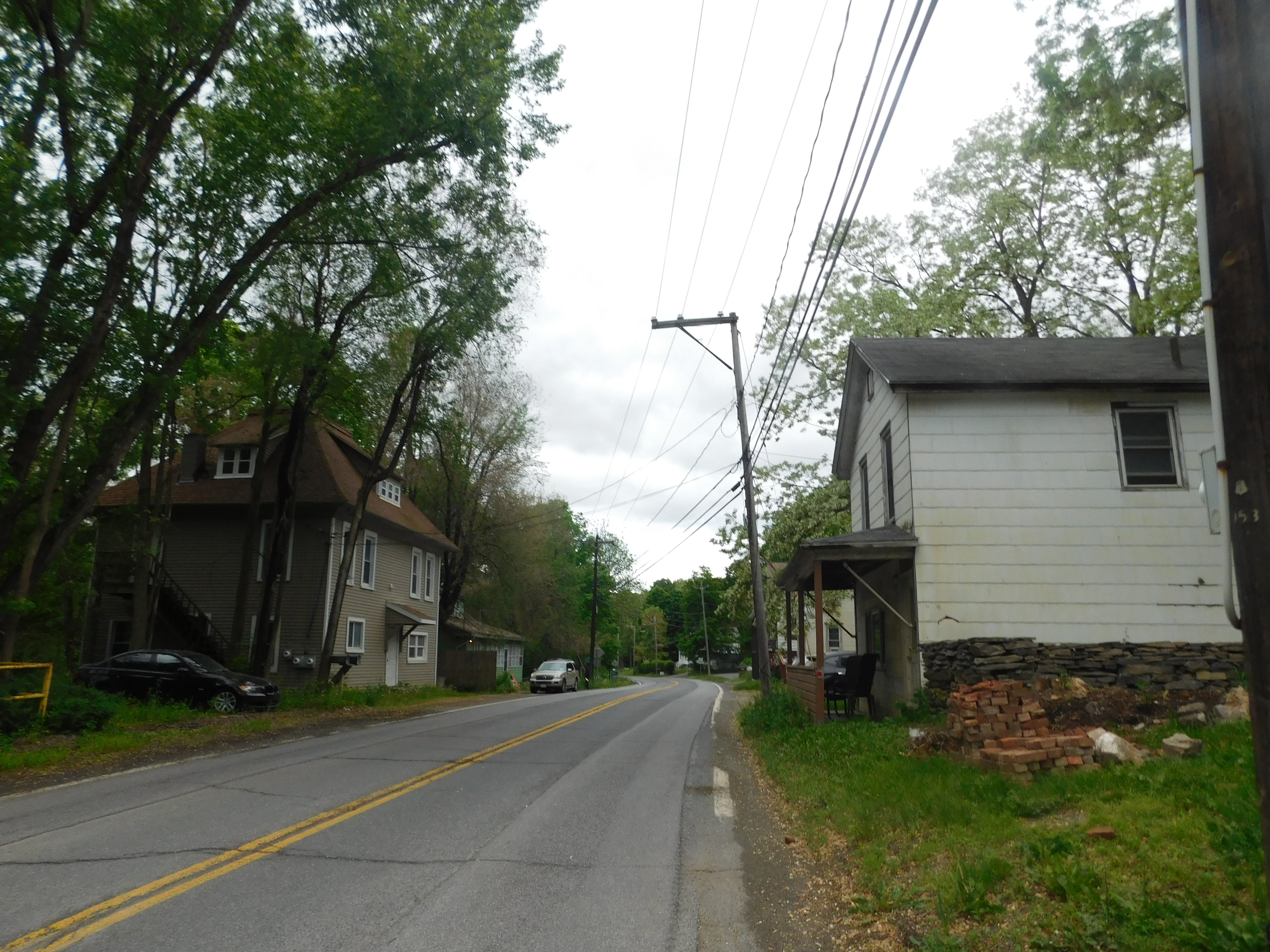
NY 217 through Mellenville

NY 217 begins at an intersection with NY 23 east of the hamlet of Claverack-Red Mills in the town of Claverack in central Columbia County. The route heads northeastward from the intersection, passing by the historic Stephen Storm House at the outskirts of the hamlet of Claverack-Red Mills and into a rural portion of the town. At an intersection with Roxbury Road, NY 217 passes the Columbia Golf and Country Club to the west and begins to parallel Claverack Creek. NY 217 intersects with CR 18 (Fish and Game Road), then enters the populous hamlet of Mellenville.

In the center of Mellenville, NY 217 intersects with CR 9 (Mellenville Road), with NY 217 serving as CR 9's southern terminus. NY 217 then heads southeast, crossing Claverack Creek and passing Mellenville Union Cemetery to the north as well as the adjacent Claverack Town Park. The route turns eastward and meets the northern terminus of Roxbury Road as it enters the village of Philmont. Within Philmont, NY 217 follows Main Street through the center of the densely populated village. At an intersection with Maple Street, the highway comes within view of Summit Lake, a small water body in the center of Philmont. Past the lake, NY 217 turns northeast once more and intersects with CR 11 (Martindale Road) as it leaves the village.

East of the village of Philmont, NY 217 continues into the town of Hillsdale, with the highway winding its way through a mixture of dense woods and open fields. Shortly after, the route turns eastward and the woods around the highway begin to cease. Here, NY 217 ends at a parclo interchange with the Taconic State Parkway, and becomes CR 21C just east of here at an intersection with Harder Road.

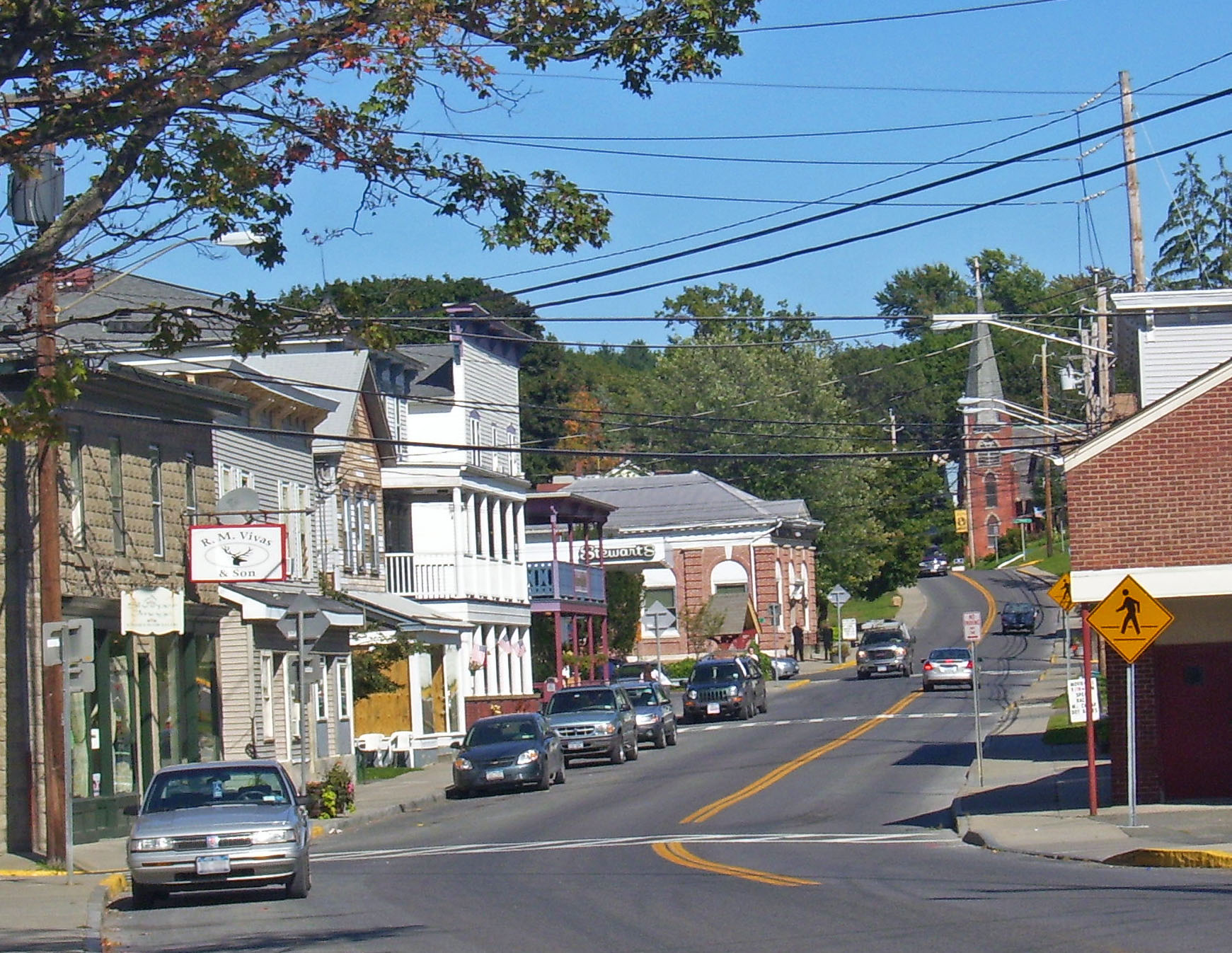
NY 217 crossing through downtown Philmont

== History ==
The north–south roadway connecting the hamlets of Claverack-Red Mills and Mellenville (both located within the town of Claverack) was originally designated as the southernmost part of NY 66 in the mid-1920s. A connector between NY 66 in Mellenville and NY 22 in North Hillsdale via Philmont was designated as NY 217 as part of the 1930 renumbering of state highways in New York. NY 66 was rerouted south of the hamlet of Ghent c. 1933 to follow its modern alignment to the city of Hudson. NY 217 was then extended southwestward along NY 66's former alignment to NY 23 east of Claverack.

NY 217 was truncated on its eastern end to Harlemville c. 1935. On April 1, 1980, NY 217 was truncated again, this time to its interchange with the Taconic State Parkway, as a result of a highway maintenance swap between the state of New York and Columbia County. The former routing of NY 217 from Harlemville to North Hillsdale is now CR 21 while the portion from the Taconic Parkway to Harlemville is designated as CR 21C.

== Major intersections ==
The entire route is in Columbia County.

| Location | mi | km | Destinations | Notes |
|---|---|---|---|---|
| Claverack | 0.00 | 0.00 | NY 23 – Hillsdale | Western terminus; hamlet of Red Mills |
| Claverack | 3.50 | 5.63 | CR 9 north | Southern terminus of CR 9; former NY 66; hamlet of Mellenville |
| Ghent | 6.65 | 10.70 | Taconic State Parkway | Exit 91 on Taconic State Parkway |
| Ghent | 6.78 | 10.91 | CR 21C east | Continuation east |
1.000 mi = 1.609 km; 1.000 km = 0.621 mi
