= Dr. Abram Jordan House =

Historic house in New York, United States

- U.S. National Register of Historic Places
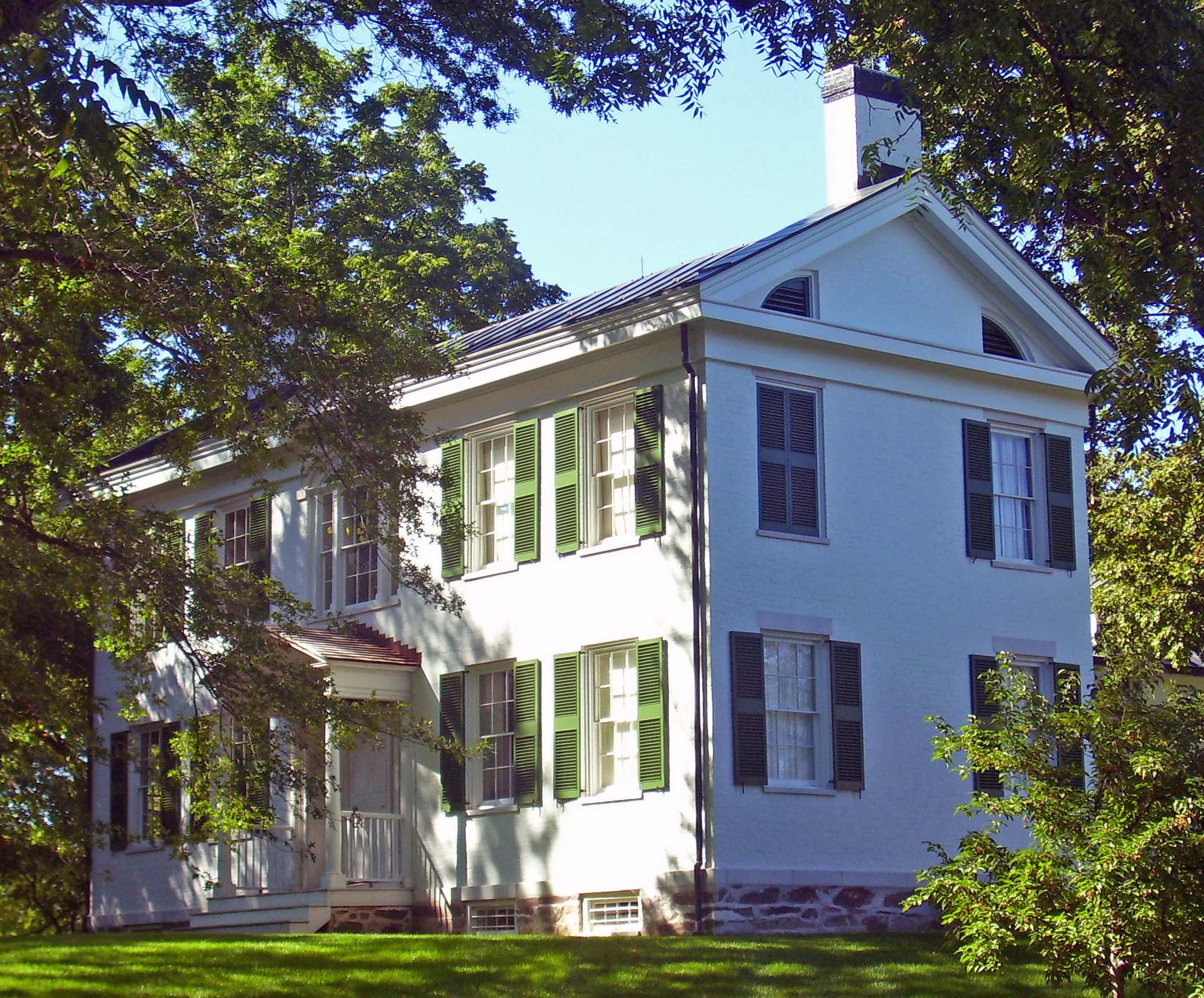
- South elevation and east profile, 2008

- Location within New York Location within the United States
- Location: Claverack-Red Mills, New York
- Nearest city: Hudson
- Coordinates: 42°13′29″N 73°43′25″W
- Built: 1822
- Architectural style: Federal, Greek Revival
- NRHP reference No.: 99001135
- Added to NRHP: September 9, 1999

The Dr. Abram Jordan House (also known as the Wedding Present House) is located along the NY 23 state highway in Claverack-Red Mills, New York, United States. It is a brick Federal style house, with some Greek Revival decorative touches, built in the 1820s as a wedding present from a local landowner to his daughter and son-in-law.

It typifies the application of that style in the eastern upper Hudson Valley. In 1999 it was listed on the National Register of Historic Places.

== Property ==
The house is on a lot of less than 2 acres (0.81 ha) along the north side of Route 23, just north of the Van Wyck Lane intersection. It is set back slightly from the road, on a slight rise. To its west are other older houses on large lots, two of which, the Stephen Miller House across the street and Van Rensselaer Lower Manor House a few hundred feet to the west, are also listed on the National Register. To the east the land descends slightly into an area of more densely developed and newer residential subdivisions on either side of the road. There are three other buildings on the property, all of them considered contributing to its historic character.

The building itself is a two-story, five-by-two-bay structure on a stone foundation sided in brick painted white topped with a low gabled roof covered in seamed metal panels. A boxed cornice and plain frieze mark the roofline. Two white brick chimneys rise at the ends. A single-story brick service wing, with attached frame extension, projects from the north.

All the windows have green louvered shutters. The south (front) facade is dominated by the centrally located main entrance on the first floor. It is sheltered by an open gable porch supported by columns. The entrance itself is flanked by sidelights and pilasters and surmounted by an ornate fanlight and segmented arched lintel. Above it is a detailed tripartite window within an arch partially cut into the frieze and cornice above it. It is flanked by pilasters supported another segmented arch lintel.

The identical east and west elevations feature fully pedimented gable fields, rising slightly above the roofline to create a parapet effect. Quarter windows are within on both elevations. The east side's lower stories feature windows similar to those on the rest of the house; the west side's are smaller. There are no windows on the portion of the north (rear) facade not connected to the wing.

The six-paneled main entrance door opens on a wide central hall with finely crafted staircase featuring carved stair ends and maple balustrade and newels. There are large rooms on each side, both with an original carved mantelpieces, moldings and ornamental plaster ceilings and walls. This floor plan is duplicated on the second floor, which has had more modifications to its interior but retains the same original wide-plank wooden flooring found on the first story.

Most of the rear kitchen wing has been modernized. An original cooking fireplace and baking oven remains in the frame portion, which also has other older finishes. It is possible that this may have been a separate building at one time.

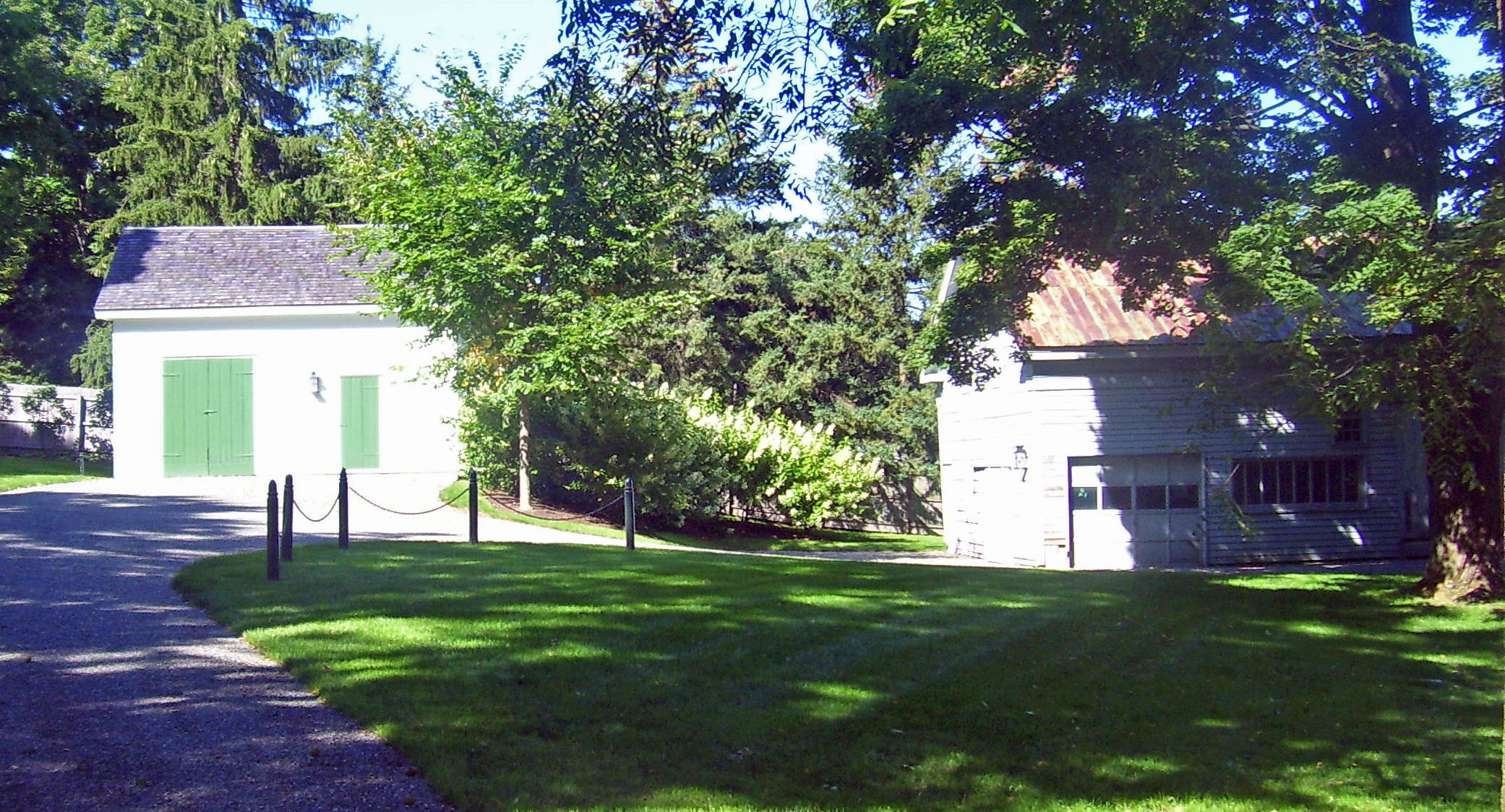
The barns

Behind the house is a brick smokehouse. It is one story high, with a gabled roof extended to cover the entrance. The two barns to the northeast have extensive Greek Revival ornamentation.

== History ==
Local landowner Peter Mesick had the house built in 1822 as a wedding present for his daughter Catherine, who wed Jordan that same year. At that time the house was strictly Federal style in form, with its rigid symmetries and restrained classically inspired decorations. The smokehouse was built at the same time.

In 1845 the two barns were built, and the house updated in the Greek Revival style which had become popular in the interim. That resulted in the pediments along the gables. There have been no major changes to the property since then.

== See also ==
- National Register of Historic Places listings in Columbia County, New York
