= Mellenville, New York =

- Hamlet
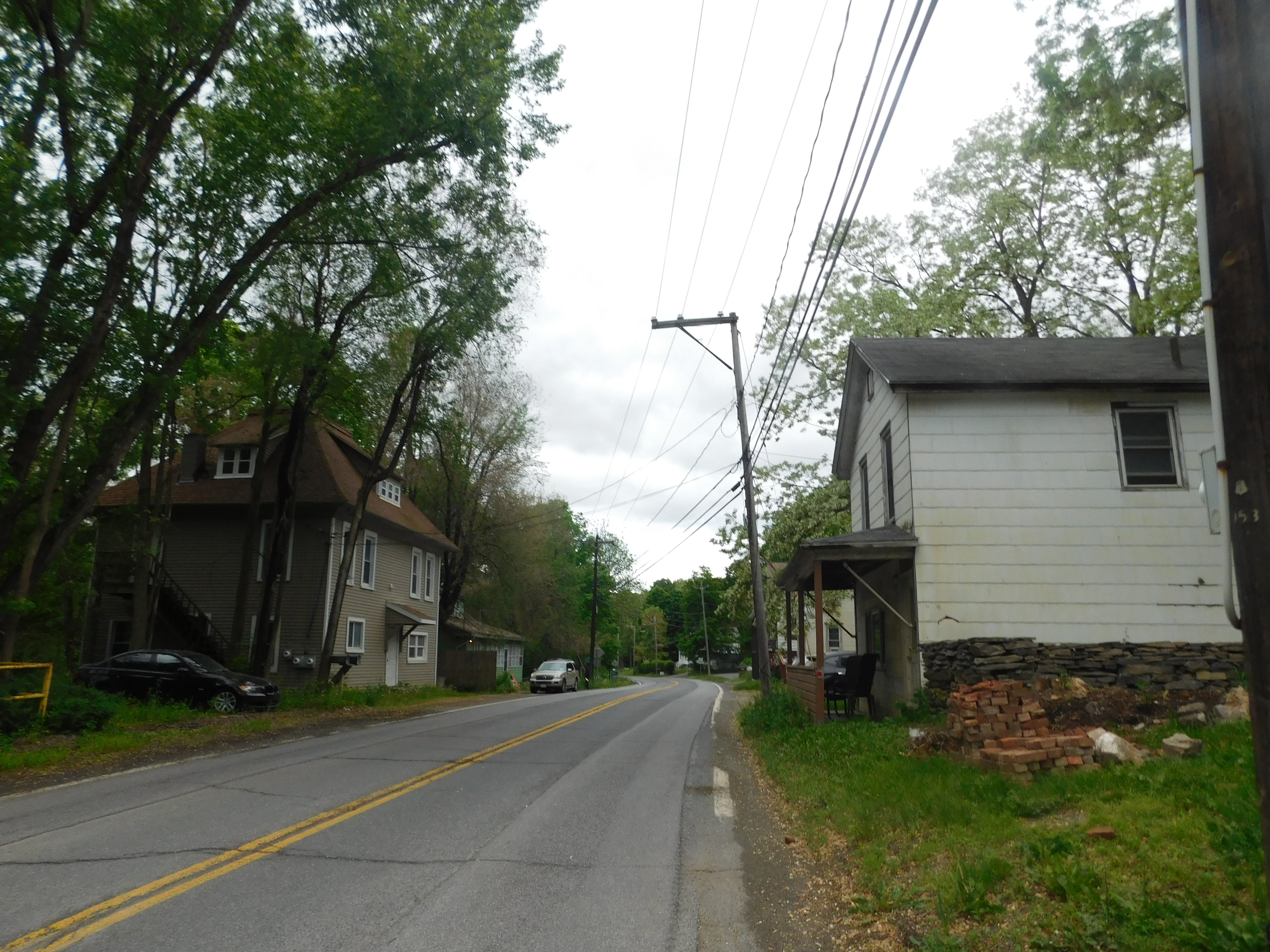
- NY 217 westbound through Mellenville

- Location within New York Location within the United States
- Coordinates: 42°15′11″N 73°40′03″W
- Country: United States
- State: New York
- County: Columbia
- Elevation: 269 ft (82 m)
- Time zone: UTC-5 (Eastern (EST))
  - Summer (DST): UTC-4 (EDT)
- ZIP code: 12544
- Area codes: 518 & 838
- GNIS feature ID: 956923

Mellenville is a hamlet in Columbia County, New York, United States. The community is located along New York State Route 217 0.8 miles (1.3 km) west of Philmont. Mellenville has a post office with ZIP code 12544.
