= Ghent (CDP), New York =

Ghent, New York
- Census-designated place
- Location within New York Location within the United States
- Coordinates: 42°19′45″N 73°37′0″W
- Country: United States
- State: New York
- County: Columbia
- Town: Ghent

Area
  - Total: 1.64 sq mi (4.24 km^{2})
  - Land: 1.63 sq mi (4.21 km^{2})
  - Water: 0.012 sq mi (0.03 km^{2})
- Elevation: 407 ft (124 m)

Population (2020)
  - Total: 623
  - Density: 383.5/sq mi (148.06/km^{2})
- Time zone: UTC-5 (Eastern (EST))
  - Summer (DST): UTC-4 (EDT)
- ZIP Codes: 12075 (Ghent); 12037 (Chatham)
- Area code: 518
- FIPS code: 36-28860
- GNIS feature ID: 0951055

Ghent is a census-designated place (CDP) in the town of Ghent in Columbia County, New York, United States. The population of the CDP was 477 at the 2022 survey, out of a total town population of 5,402.

The community is located 11.3 miles northeast of the city of Hudson on New York Route 66.

Ghent was originally the site of a Mahican Native American village known as Squampamock, Scom-pa-muck or Squampanoc.

== Geography ==
Ghent is located in the northeast part of the town of Ghent at 42°19′45″N 73°36′59″W (42.329228, -73.616596), bordered on the north by Kline Kill, a stream which flows north to Kinderhook Creek, a tributary of the Hudson River.

New York State Route 66 passes through Ghent, leading southwest 11 miles (18 km) to Hudson, the Columbia County seat, and northeast 2.5 miles (4.0 km) to Chatham.

According to the United States Census Bureau, the CDP has a total area of 1.5 square miles (4.0 km^{2}), of which 0.01 square miles (0.03 km^{2}), or 0.70%, is water.

== Demographics ==
Historical population
Census	Pop.	Note	%±
2000	586		—
2010	564		−3.8%
2020	623		10.5%
U.S. Decennial Census

At the 2022 census, there were 477 people, 194 households and 143 families residing in the CDP. The population density was 380.6 inhabitants per square mile (147.0/km^{2}). There were 284 housing units at an average density of 162.4 per square mile (62.7/km^{2}). The racial makeup of the CDP was 57.9% White, 3.6% Black or African American, 0% Native American, 0.2% Asian, and 16.6% from two or more races. Hispanic or Latino of any race were 21.8% of the population.

There were 194 households, of which 25.8% had children under the age of 18 living with them, 67.5% were married couples living together, 6.2% had a female householder with no husband present, and 26.3% were non-families. 19.6% of all households were made up of individuals, and 19.6% had someone living alone who was 65 years of age or older. The average household size was 2.40 and the average family size was 2.72.

17.8% of the population were under the age of 18, 0.6% from 18 to 24, 36.3% from 25 to 44, 47.3% from 45 to 64, and 8% who were 65 years of age or older. The median age was 51.5 years. For every 100 females, there were 121.9 males. For every 100 females age 18 and over, there were 97.8 males.

The median household income was $128,984 and the median family income was $128,242. Males had a median income of $61,875. The per capita income for the CDP was $52.458. None of the families and 5.24% of the population were living below the poverty line, including no under eighteens and 7.5% of those age 35 to 64.
