= Philmont, New York =

- Village
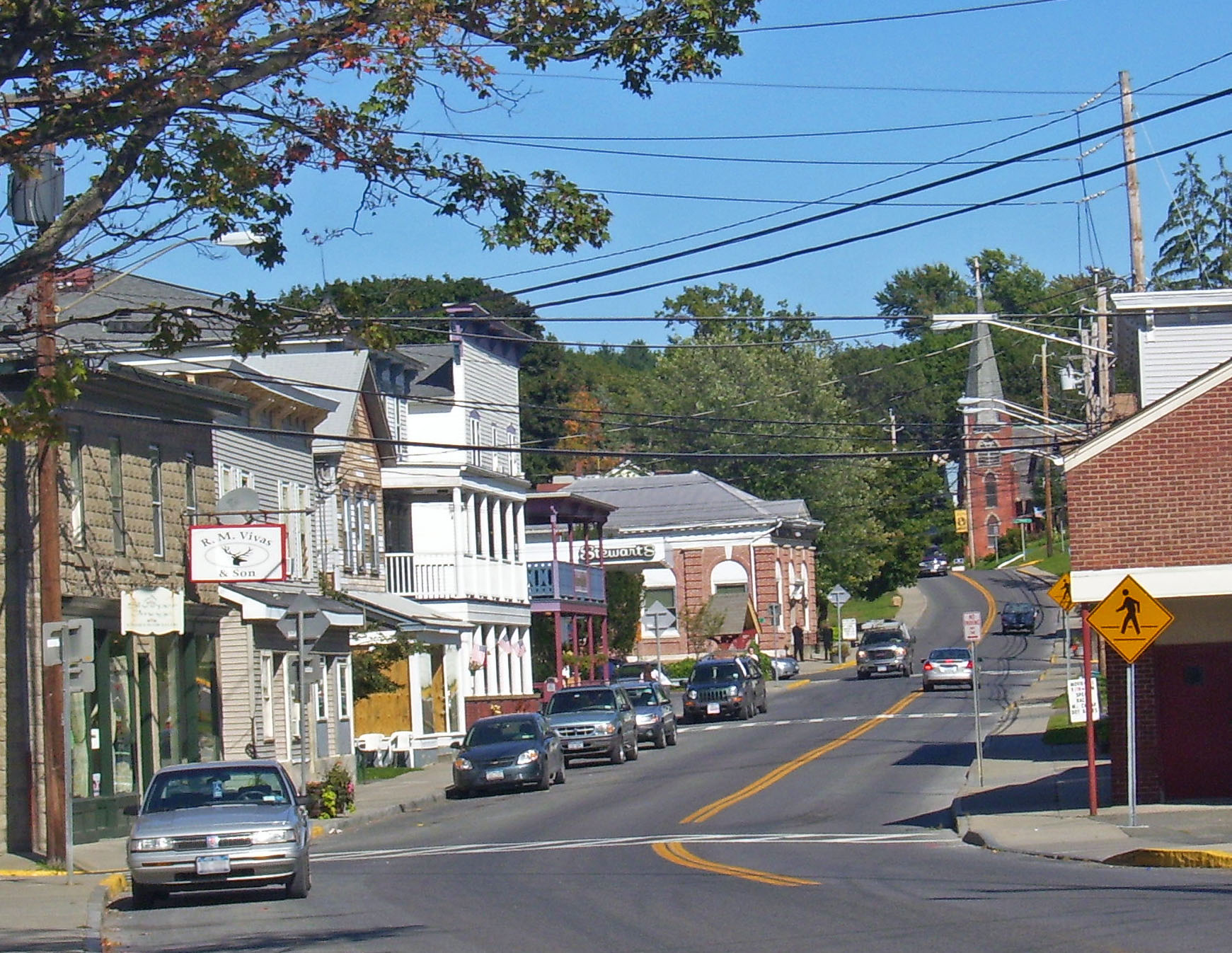
- Downtown Philmont, looking east along NY 217

- Location of Philmont, New York

- Location of New York in the United States
- Coordinates: 42°14′56″N 73°38′56″W
- Country: United States
- State: New York
- County: Columbia
- Founded: 1892

Government
  - Mayor: Brian Johnson

Area
  - Total: 1.25 sq mi (3.25 km^{2})
  - Land: 1.22 sq mi (3.15 km^{2})
  - Water: 0.039 sq mi (0.10 km^{2})
- Elevation: 500 ft (150 m)
- Highest elevation (Unnamed hill in SE quadrant of village): 690 ft (210 m)
- Lowest elevation (Agawamuck Creek on W boundary): 280 ft (85 m)

Population (2020)
  - Total: 1,377
  - Density: 1,132.8/sq mi (437.39/km^{2})
- Time zone: UTC-5 (Eastern (EST))
  - Summer (DST): UTC-4 (EDT)
- ZIP Code: 12565
- Area code: 518
- FIPS code: 36-57639
- GNIS feature ID: 0960311
- Website: philmont.org

Philmont is a village in Columbia County, New York, United States. The population was 1,377 at the 2020 census. The village is located in the northeastern part of the town of Claverack on New York State Route 217.

== History ==
The community was once known as "Factory Hill" because of the number of wool factories. The village was incorporated in 1891. It derives its name from George P. Philip, who built a 36-acre (15 ha) reservoir to provide water for his mill. This in turn led to the construction of a 56-acre (23 ha) reservoir up the "mountain" in the Taconic Mountains to guarantee water to the mills, thus creating the factory hill.

== Geography ==
Philmont is located at 42°14′55″N 73°38′51″W (42.248620, -73.647602).

According to the United States Census Bureau, the village has a total area of 1.23 square miles (3.18 km^{2}), of which 1.19 square miles (3.08 km^{2}) is land and 0.04 square miles (0.10 km^{2}), or 3.16%, is water.

The village is alongside Summit Lake and Agawamuck Creek, which drops over its High Falls near the center of the village. The creek is a tributary of Claverack Creek, which flows about 7.5 miles (12.1 km) to the Hudson River.

== Demographics ==
Historical population
Census	Pop.	Note	%±
1880	1,343		—
1890	1,818		35.4%
1900	1,964		8.0%
1910	1,813		−7.7%
1920	1,919		5.8%
1930	1,868		−2.7%
1940	1,679		−10.1%
1950	1,792		6.7%
1960	1,750		−2.3%
1970	1,674		−4.3%
1980	1,539		−8.1%
1990	1,623		5.5%
2000	1,480		−8.8%
2010	1,379		−6.8%
2020	1,377		−0.1%
U.S. Decennial Census 2020

At the 2000 census, there were 1,480 people, 576 households and 361 families residing in the village. The population density was 1,256.9 per square mile (485.3/km^{2}). There were 644 housing units at an average density of 546.9 per square mile (211.2/km^{2}). The racial make-up of the village was 94.53% White, 1.69% African American, 0.34% Native American, 0.20% Asian, 1.96% from other races and 1.28% from two or more races. Hispanic or Latino of any race were 3.72% of the population.

There were 576 households, of which 34.2% had children under the age of 18 living with them, 45.0% were married couples living together, 11.6% had a female householder with no husband present and 37.3% were non-families. 29.5% of all households were made up of individuals, and 13.7% had someone living alone who was 65 years of age or older. The average household size was 2.55 and the average family size was 3.20.

28.9% of the population were under the age of 18, 8.0% from 18 to 24, 29.4% from 25 to 44, 19.9% from 45 to 64 and 13.8% were 65 years of age or older. The median age was 35 years. For every 100 females, there were 98.4 males. For every 100 females age 18 and over, there were 94.5 males.

The median household income was $31,094 and the median family income was $41,944. Males had a median income of $27,188 and females $23,274. The per capita income was $16,162. About 11.3% of families and 13.7% of the population were below the poverty line, including 14.9% of those under age 18 and 6.3% of those age 65 or over.

== Sites of interest ==
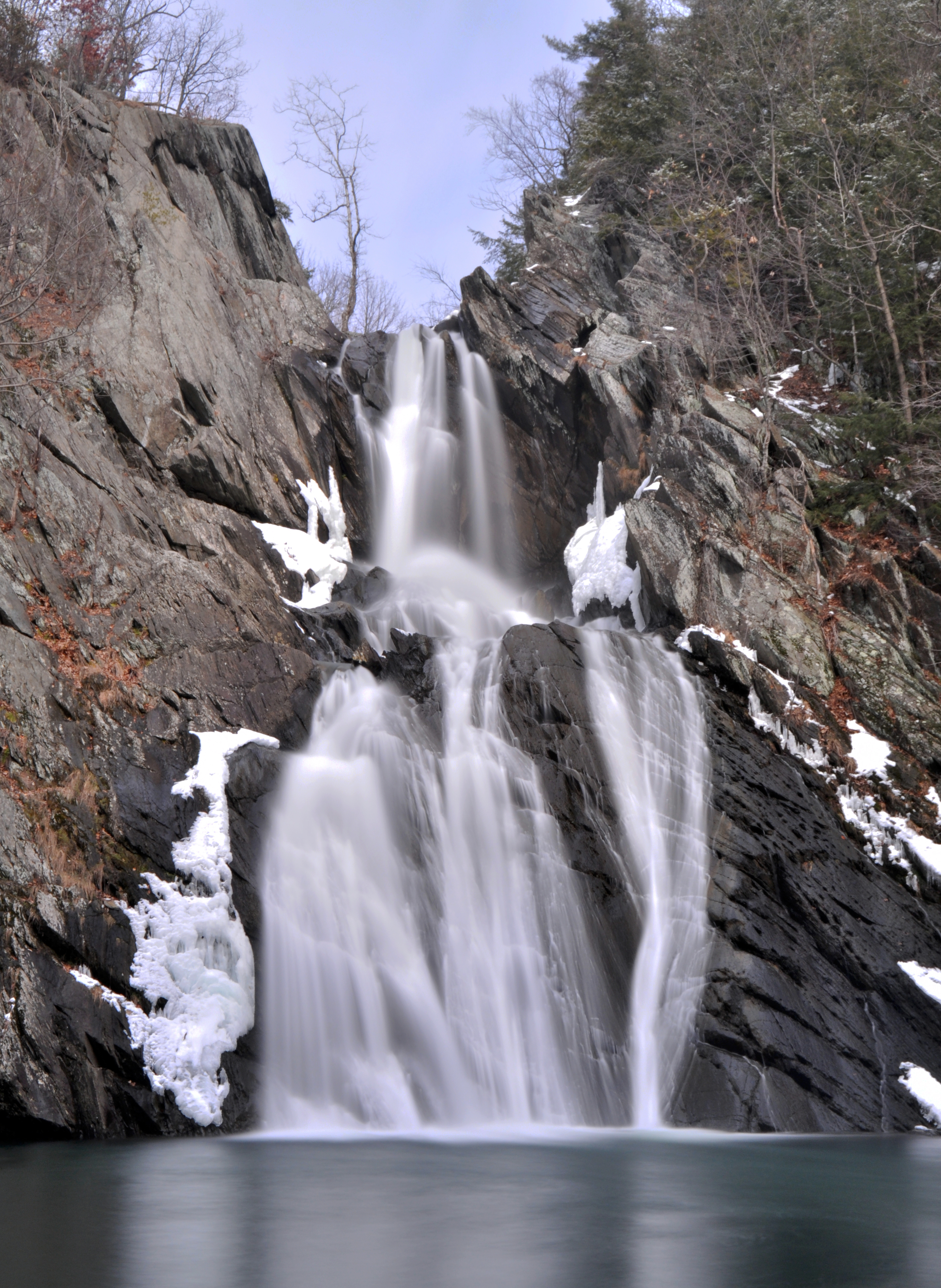
High Falls in the winter of 2013

The High Falls Conservation Area, a 47-acre (19 ha) property in the village, with access from the town of Claverack, is owned and managed by the Columbia Land Conservancy. High Falls, Columbia County's highest waterfall, cascades 150 feet (46 m) before culminating in a large pool. The water flows southwest, then northwest by Claverack Creek, until eventually reaching the Hudson River.

The village is part of the Taconic Hills Central School District.

Summit Lake, a 36 acre lake in walking distance of Philmont's Main Street. It was created in the 1800s by George Philip as a reservoir for factories and mills which operated downstream from the lake. The lake is proximate to Agawamuck Creek, a state- and federally protected trout stream which feeds into the Hudson River, which flows south to New York City and empties into the Atlantic Ocean. Summit Lake is home to hundreds of native species of birds, butterflies, flowers, trees, and plants, including wood ducks, brown trout, largemouth bass, dragonflies, dozens of species of native trees, flowers, water plants, and animals of conservation concern such as bald eagles, monarch butterflies, and two species of endangered bats.

Old Summit Knitting Mill, grown from the original George Philip mill.

== Notable people ==
- Oliver North, United States Marine Corps officer, Reagan-era government official and Fox News contributor
- Claude Rossman, Major League Baseball player from 1904-1909
