= Ghent, New York =

- Town
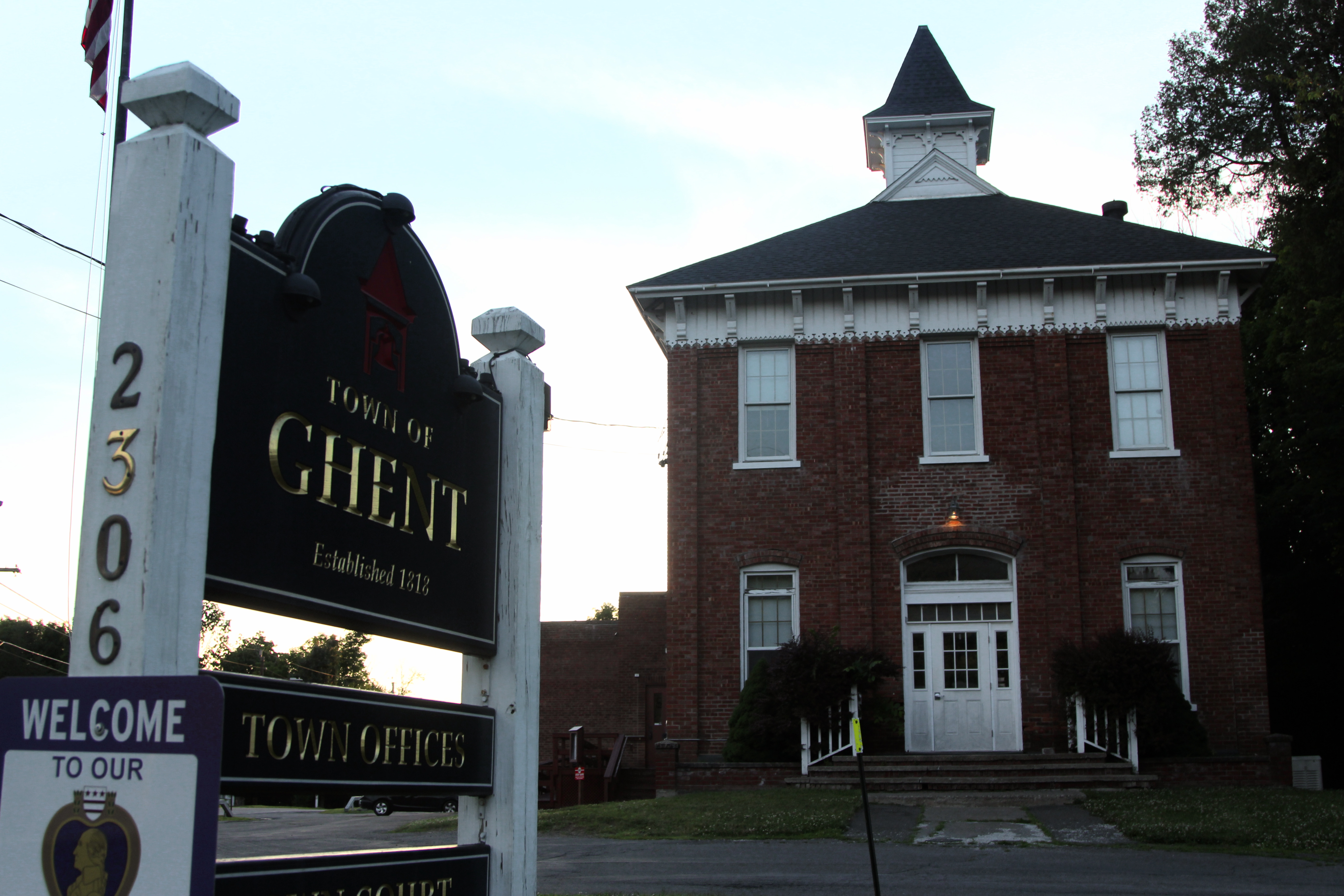
- Ghent Town Hall in Ghent, NY

- Location of Ghent, New York
- Coordinates: 42°18′56″N 73°38′57″W
- Country: United States
- State: New York
- County: Columbia

Government
  - Type: Town council
  - Town Supervisor: Craig Simmons (R)
  - Town Council: Members' List: • Dan Barufaldi (D); • Walter Engel (R); • Scott Myers (R); • Lynda Nielsen (R)

Area
  - Total: 45.40 sq mi (117.58 km^{2})
  - Land: 45.13 sq mi (116.89 km^{2})
  - Water: 0.27 sq mi (0.69 km^{2})
- Elevation: 404 ft (123 m)

Population (2020)
  - Total: 5,303
  - Density: 117.5/sq mi (45.37/km^{2})
- Time zone: UTC-5 (Eastern (EST))
  - Summer (DST): UTC-4 (EDT)
- ZIP Codes: 12075 (Ghent); 12037 (Chatham); 12184 (Valatie); 12529 (Hillsdale); 12534 (Hudson)
- Area code: 518
- FIPS code: 36-021-28871
- GNIS feature ID: 0979000
- Website: townofghent.org

Ghent is a town in Columbia County, New York, United States, with a ZIP code of 12075. The population was 5,303 at the 2020 census, down from the 2010 census population of 5,402. Ghent is centrally located in the county and is northeast of the city of Hudson.

== History ==
Around 1735, early settlers, exploiting areas cleared by the natives, moved into the area. In 1818, the town of Ghent was founded from parts of the towns of Chatham, Claverack and Kinderhook. It was named after the Treaty of Ghent.

Located at Ghent is the historic Van Valkenburgh-Isbister Farm, added to the National Register of Historic Places in 2006.

== Geography ==
According to the United States Census Bureau, the town has a total area of 45.4 square miles (117.6 km^{2}), of which 45.1 square miles (116.9 km^{2}) is land and 0.27 square miles (0.7 km^{2}), or 0.59%, is water.

The Taconic State Parkway crosses the southeastern corner of the town.

== Demographics ==
Historical population
| Census | Pop. | Note | %± |
|---|---|---|---|
| 1820 | 2,379 | | — |
| 1830 | 2,790 | | 17.3% |
| 1840 | 2,558 | | −8.3% |
| 1850 | 2,293 | | −10.4% |
| 1860 | 2,803 | | 22.2% |
| 1870 | 2,886 | | 3.0% |
| 1880 | 2,953 | | 2.3% |
| 1890 | 2,903 | | −1.7% |
| 1900 | 2,693 | | −7.2% |
| 1910 | 2,819 | | 4.7% |
| 1920 | 2,451 | | −13.1% |
| 1930 | 2,818 | | 15.0% |
| 1940 | 2,948 | | 4.6% |
| 1950 | 3,173 | | 7.6% |
| 1960 | 3,485 | | 9.8% |
| 1970 | 3,729 | | 7.0% |
| 1980 | 4,636 | | 24.3% |
| 1990 | 4,812 | | 3.8% |
| 2000 | 5,272 | | 9.6% |
| 2010 | 5,402 | | 2.5% |
| 2020 | 5,303 | | −1.8% |
U.S. Decennial Census

At the 2020 census, there were 5,303 people, 1,914 households and 1,307 families residing in the town. The population density was 116.8 per square mile (45.1/km^{2}). There were 2,244 housing units at an average density of 49.7 per square mile (19.2/km^{2}). The racial makeup was 96.93% white, 1.1% African American, .23% Native American, .19% Asian, .28% from other races and 1.27% from two or more races. Hispanic or Latino of any race were 1.35% of the population.

There were 2,020 households, of which 32.0% had children under the age of 18 living with them, 55.8% were married couples living together, 9.5% had a female householder, and 30.8% were non-families. 25.9% of all households were made up of individuals, and 11.5% had someone living alone who was 65 years of age or older. The average household size was 2.50 and the average family size was 2.98.

24.2% of the population were under the age of 18, 5.7% from 18 to 24, 27.1% from 25 to 44, 25.8% from 45 to 64, and 17.2% who were 65 years of age or older. The median age was 40.8 years. For every 100 females, there were 94.6 males. For every 100 females age 18 and over, there were 89.5 males.

The median household income was $43,529 and the median family income was $52,096. The median house value was $114,000. Males had a median income of $32,191 and females $23,958. The per capita income was $21,365. About 2.2% of families and 4.6% of the population were below the poverty line, including 4.0% of those under age 18 and 8.8% of those age 65 or over.

== Communities and locations in Ghent ==
- Arnolds Mill – a hamlet in the northeastern corner of the town, northeast of Ghent village.
- Buckleyville – a hamlet in the northeastern part of the town, northeast of Ghent village
- Chatham – the southern half of the village of Chatham is in the northeastern corner of Ghent, on the northern town boundary.
- Columbia County Airport (1B1) – an airport in the southwestern part of the town.
- Ghent – the hamlet of Ghent is on Route 66 in the northeastern section of the town of Ghent; the Bartlett House was added to the National Register of Historic Places in 2012
- Omi – a hamlet in the northwestern part of the town, east of West Ghent on County Road 22.
- Pulvers – a hamlet in the southern part of the town.
- West Ghent – a hamlet in the northwestern part of the town, on Route 9H.

== Education ==
High schools in Ghent include Columbia Christian Academy and Hawthorne Valley Waldorf School.

== Notable people ==
- Stephen Metcalf, writer, critic and podcaster
- Kristanna Loken, actress
- Henry Hogeboom (1809–1872), New York State Supreme Court judge
- Morris Levy, American music executive
- William Wegman, American artist famous for compositions including dogs, particularly Weimaraners.
- William J. Leggett (1848–1925), American football player, team captain of Rutgers in the first ever football game.
- Michael Schrom, racing driver
