= Union Station (Chatham, New York) =

Former railroad station in New York State (closed 1976)

Chatham
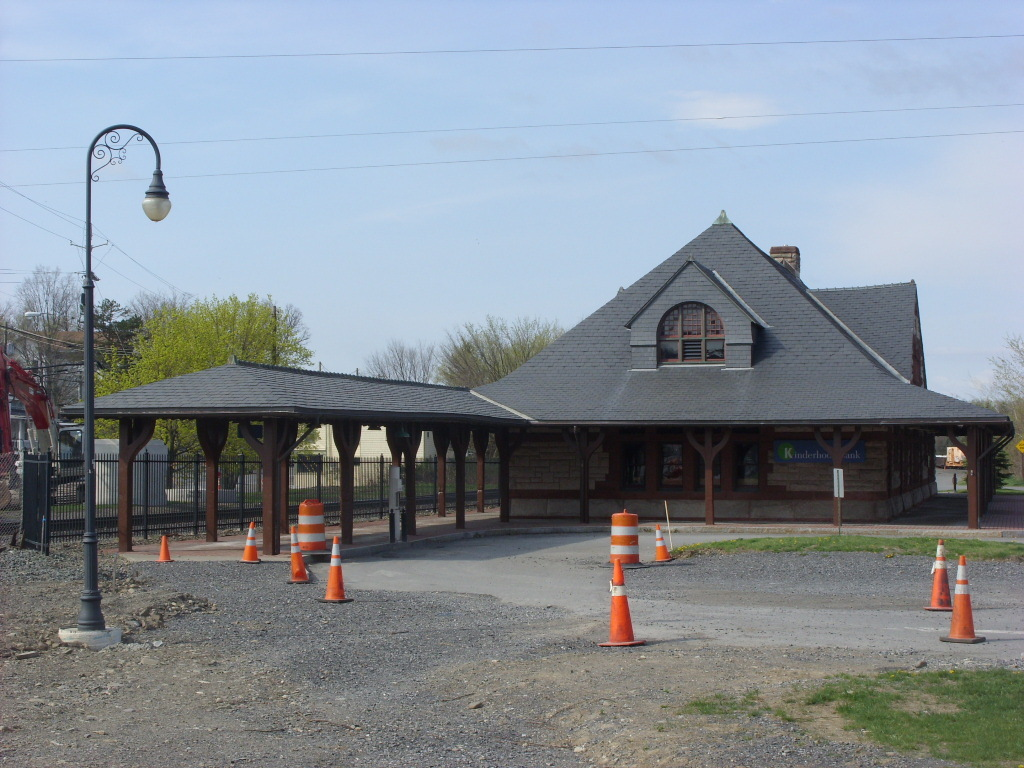
- Union Station in April 2009

General information
- Location: 99 Depot Square, Chatham, New York
- Owner: Town of Chatham
- Lines: New York and Harlem Railroad, Boston and Albany Railroad, Rutland Railroad
- Platforms: 1 side platform
- Tracks: 1

History
- Opened: 1887
- Closed: March 20, 1972 (passengers); March 1976 (freight)

Former services
Preceding station	New York Central Railroad	Following station
Niverville toward Albany	Boston and Albany Railroad Main Line	Pittsfield toward Boston
Chatham Corner toward Albany	Boston and Albany Railroad Main Line	East Chatham toward Boston
Ghent toward New York	Harlem Division	Terminus
Payn's toward Hudson	Hudson Branch	Terminus
Preceding station	Rutland Railroad	Following station
Terminus	Chatham Branch	Old Chatham toward Bennington
- Union Station
- U.S. National Register of Historic Places
- Interactive map of Union Station
- Location: 99 Depot Square; Chatham, New York
- Coordinates: 42°21′42″N 73°35′52″W
- Architect: Shepley, Rutan and Coolidge
- Architectural style: Richardsonian Romanesque
- NRHP reference No.: 74001225
- Added to NRHP: May 1, 1974
Location

Union Station served the residents of Chatham, New York, from 1887 to 1972 as a passenger station and until 1976 as a freight station. It was the final stop for Harlem Line trains. It had originally served trains of the Boston and Albany Railroad, then the New York Central Railroad and the Rutland Railway. It served as a junction for service that radiated to Rensselaer, New York, to the northwest; Hudson, New York, to the southwest; Vermont, to the northeast, and Pittsfield, Massachusetts to the east and New York City, to the south.

The building is listed on the National Register of Historic Places and currently serves as a branch office of Community Bank. Though it no longer serves as a train station, the rail line alongside it is still a very active mainline for CSX freight rail between Selkirk Yard, south of Albany, and Worcester, Massachusetts.

== History ==
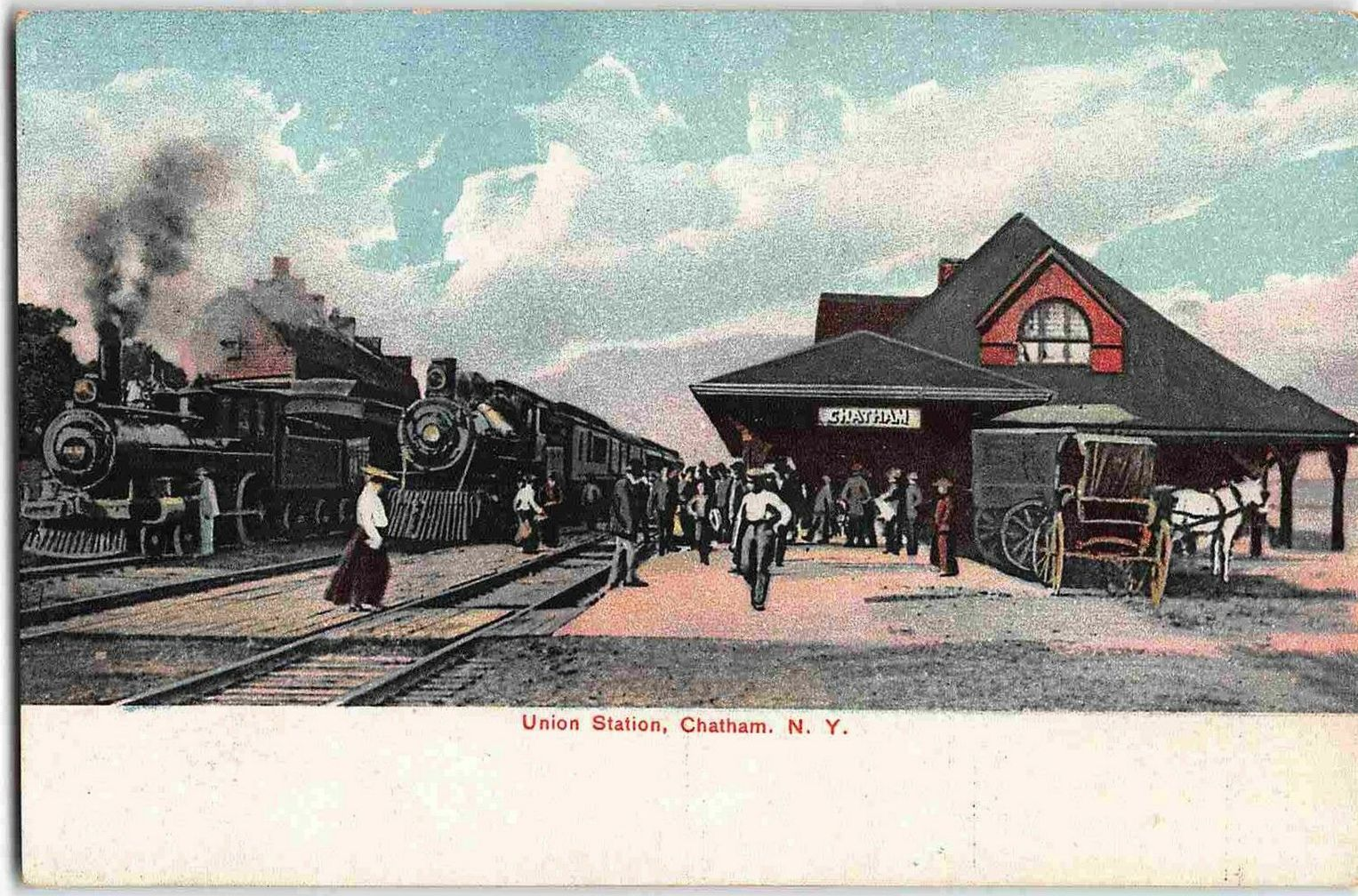
Early-20th-century postcard of the station

Before the station house was built, rail service to Chatham began on December 21, 1841, when the first portion of the Albany and West Stockbridge Railroad was put into service between Greenbush (east of Albany) and Chatham. The Harlem Extension of the New York and Harlem Railroad was built to Chatham by 1869. By late 1870, a series of company mergers led to the formation of the Boston and Albany Railroad (B&A). In 1881, the B&A hired Henry Hobson Richardson to design several stations for the railroad. Richardson died unexpectedly in 1886 and the remaining station design work was transferred to the Boston-based architecture firm of Shepley, Rutan and Coolidge. They designed the Chatham Station, which was opened for service along the B&A's Boston to Albany line in 1887. The Richardsonian Romanesque building features a Dutch gable roof with wide eaves and colonnade porticos that extend out east and west along the tracks over the low platform. The walls are made of lightly colored rusticated stone, with window and door frames, sills and lintels of contrasting brownstone. A prominent bow window faces trackside and once was used as part of the stationmaster's office.

The New York Central Railroad (NYC) took over the B&A in 1900. The station house was originally staffed by a ticket agent, but the ticket office was closed by the NYC in 1960. The last passenger service to Chatham on the east-west B&A route was daily 'Beeliner' (Budd Rail Diesel Car/"RDC") service between Albany and Boston, in 1965. The station remained as an active station for passenger service south along the NYC's Harlem Line until March 20, 1972. Under the aegis of Conrail, the station was closed in March, 1976 when freight operations from Ghent to Millerton were terminated.

Conrail utilized the station for storage in the mid-1970s. In 1977, the freight railroad attempted to sell the station and surrounding land for $85,000.

Passenger service on the Rutland Railroad from Chatham to Bennington ended in 1931, with freight service continuing until 1951. Tracks north to North Bennington, Vermont were abandoned in 1951 and dismantled shortly afterward. The removal of the last NYC Harlem Line trackage south of Church Street followed 29 years later, in 1980. Boston and Albany Railroad trackage remains in place and is currently used by CSX Transportation. The line was single-tracked by Conrail in the late 1980s.

Chatham Union Station was listed on the National Register of Historic Places on May 1, 1974. In addition to active freight service, Amtrak's Lake Shore Limited long-distance passenger train between Chicago and Boston passes through Chatham without stopping.

The station-house was renovated and reopened in 1999 to serve as a branch of the National Union Bank of Kinderhook. Currently, the Harlem Valley Rail Trail Association has plans to extend its trail along the right-of-way in front of the site of the former station. As of September 2016, $3.5 million was appropriated to the HVRT association in Dutchess & Columbia counties to complete this project. Once completed, the HVRT will contain 46 contiguous miles of path between Wassaic and Chatham.

== See also ==
- Union Station (disambiguation)
