= Church of St. John in the Wilderness =

Historic site in Columbia County, New York, US

- U.S. National Register of Historic Places
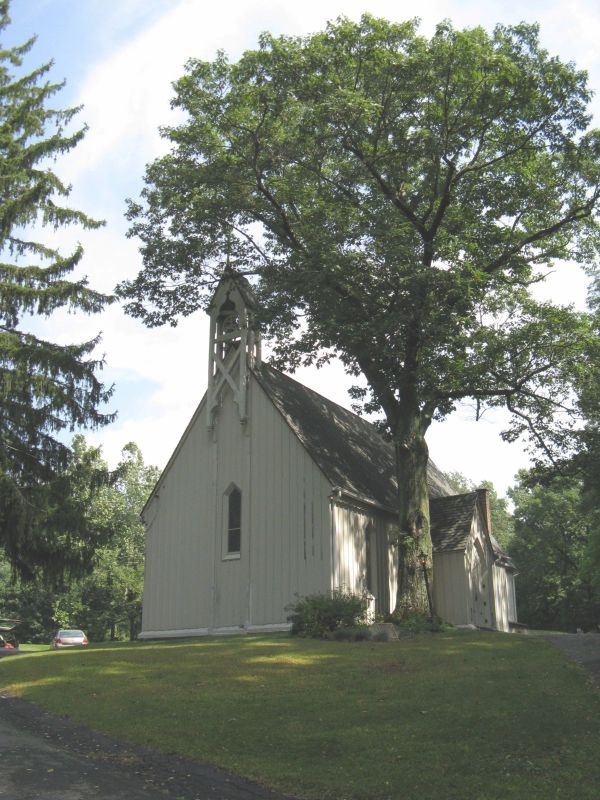
- Church of St. John in the Wilderness, September 2008

- Location within New York Location within the United States
- Location: Jct. of NY 344 and Valley View Rd., Copake Falls, New York
- Coordinates: 42°7′14″N 73°31′9″W
- Area: 2 acres (0.81 ha)
- Built: 1851
- Architect: Upjohn, Richard
- Architectural style: Gothic Revival
- NRHP reference No.: 95000963
- Added to NRHP: August 10, 1995

Church of St. John in the Wilderness is a historic Episcopal church in Copake Falls, Columbia County, New York. The church, its furnishing, and the parsonage were designed by noted ecclesiastical architect Richard Upjohn (1802–1878). It was built in 1851 and is a one-story wood-frame building clad with board and batten siding in the Gothic Revival style. It features an open frame bell cote topped by a steep gable roof. Also on the property are a contributing parsonage (1853) and two cemeteries.

Worship is progressive Christian, following the Book of Common Prayer and The Hymnal 1982. Sunday School is provided for the children and a choir sings at the principal service. Under the leadership of the Rev. John Thompson, The Church of St. John in the Wilderness has become a cultural center for Copake Falls, hosting stage plays, chamber music (Winds in the Wilderness), and Jazz Vespers. Each year, the church sponsors the Country Fair and Auction in July, Harvest Fest in October, and participates in Copake Falls Day in August.

It was listed on the National Register of Historic Places in 1995. It is located within the Copake Iron Works Historic District, established in 2007.
