= Taconic Shores, New York =

- Census-designated place
- Location within New York Location within the United States
- Coordinates: 42°7′2″N 73°33′18″W
- Country: United States
- State: New York
- County: Columbia
- Town: Copake

Area
  - Total: 1.02 sq mi (2.64 km^{2})
  - Land: 0.83 sq mi (2.15 km^{2})
  - Water: 0.19 sq mi (0.49 km^{2})
- Elevation: 531 ft (162 m)

Population (2020)
  - Total: 547
  - Density: 658/sq mi (253.9/km^{2})
- Time zone: UTC-5 (Eastern (EST))
  - Summer (DST): UTC-4 (EDT)
- ZIP Code: 12516 (Copake)
- FIPS code: 36-73057
- GNIS code: 2761353
- Website: www.taconicshores.org

Taconic Shores is a residential development and census-designated place (CDP) in Columbia County, New York, United States. The hamlet is near the geographic center of the town of Copake and surrounds Robinson Pond, a water body on the Roeliff Jansen Kill. The CDP was designated after the 2010 census. As of the 2020 census, Taconic Shores had a population of 547.

== Geography ==
Taconic Shores consists of a housing development surrounding Robinson Pond, part of the Roeliff Jansen Kill, a stream which flows west to the Hudson River. The community is just north of Copake Hamlet and the Copake Town Hall. The community of Copake Lake is 2 miles (3 km) to the northwest (5 miles (8 km) by road).

According to the United States Census Bureau, the Taconic Shores CDP has a total area of 1.0 square mile (2.6 km^{2}), of which 0.85 square miles (2.2 km^{2}) is land and 0.19 square miles (0.5 km^{2}), or 18.47%, is water.

== Demographics ==
Historical population
Census	Pop.	Note	%±
2020	547		—
U.S. Decennial Census
