= Taghkanic =

Taghkanic, a Native American word for "forest wilderness", can refer to:

- Taghkanic Creek, a stream running through Columbia County, New York
- Taghkanic, New York, a town and hamlet in Columbia County, New York
  - East Taghkanic, New York, a hamlet in Taghkanic, New York
  - West Taghkanic, New York, a hamlet in Taghkanic, New York

== See also ==
- Taconic (disambiguation)
