= Copake Memorial Clock =

- U.S. National Register of Historic Places
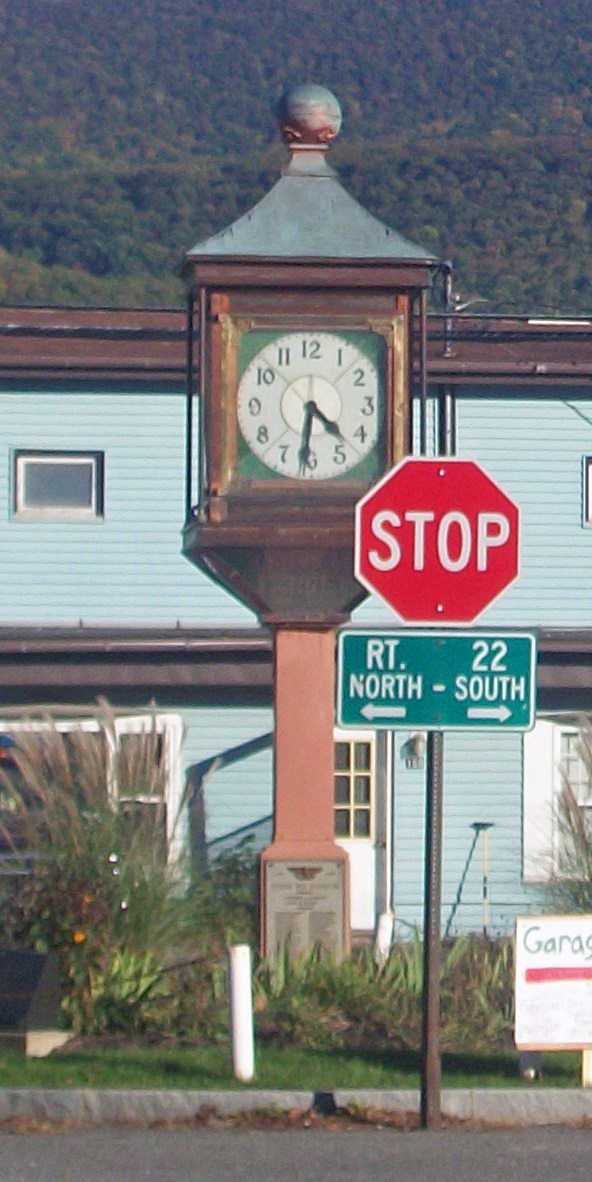
- Copake Memorial Clock, October 2010

- Location within New York Location within the United States
- Location: Main St., Copake, New York
- Coordinates: 42°06′13″N 73°32′58″W
- Area: 0.02 acres (0.0081 ha)
- Built: 1944
- NRHP reference No.: 11001089
- Added to NRHP: February 3, 2012

Copake Memorial Clock, also known as the Copake Clock, is a historic freestanding clock located at Copake, Columbia County, New York. It was erected in 1944 as a memorial to those lost in World War II, and is a four-sided pedestal-type, memorial chime clock. The metal object consisting of a base, plinth, and column topped by a copper and glass clock was manufactured by the O. C. McClintock Company of Minneapolis, Minnesota.

The death of Steven McIntyre in action in Italy during World War II inspired his uncle, Ed McIntyre, and Albert C. Bristol to spearhead a drive to create a memorial clock for all those from Copake who served in wartime. The cost of the clock — $2,600 — was a large sum at the time, especially considering world events of the day. The date of the original dedication was Oct. 29, 1944, while the U.S. was still at war.

In addition to Copake residents who served in World Wars I and II, the monument also contains plaques listing those who served in Korea and Vietnam.

The clock was rededicated in June 2011 after a complete restoration. The community raised $42,000, to replace the works and the chime unit, rebuild the entire clock body and pedestal, and restore the stained glass.

It was added to the National Register of Historic Places in 2012.

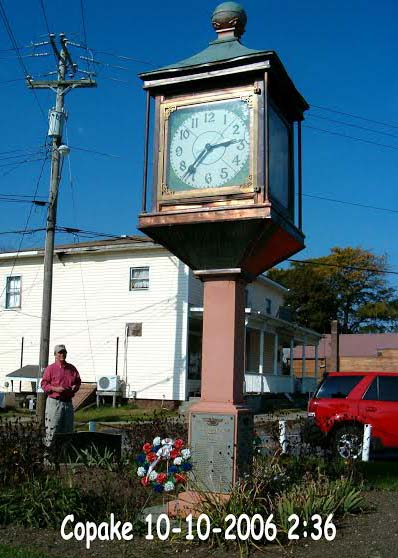
The Copake memorial clock
