= Copake Falls Methodist Episcopal Church =

Historic church in New York, United States

- U.S. National Register of Historic Places
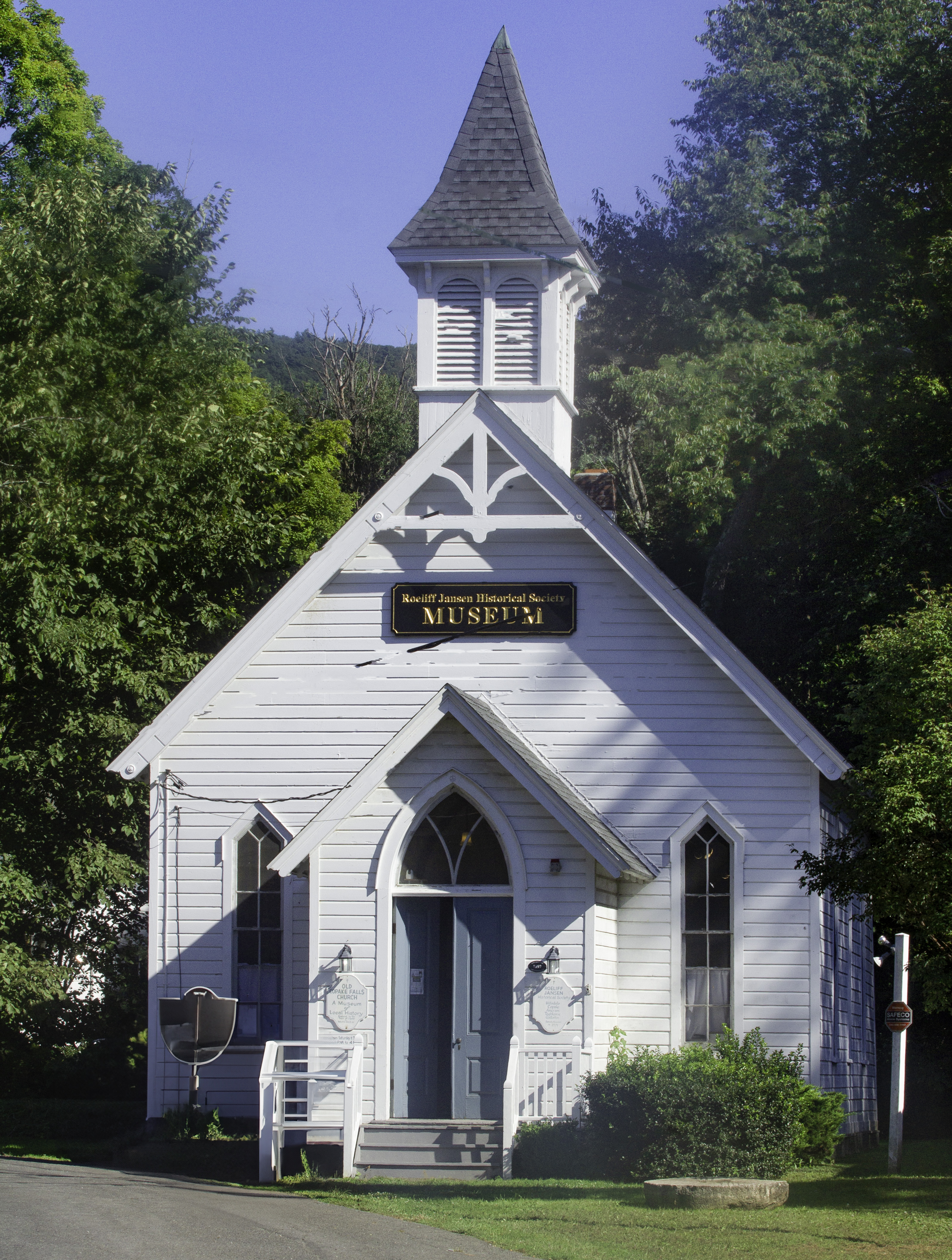

- Location within New York Location within the United States
- Location: Miles Rd., Copake Falls, New York
- Coordinates: 42°07′10″N 73°31′27″W
- Area: 0.09 acres (0.036 ha)
- Built: c. 1891-1892
- Architectural style: Gothic
- NRHP reference No.: 12000405
- Added to NRHP: July 11, 2012

Copake Falls Methodist Episcopal Church, also known as the Copake Iron Works Methodist Church, is a historic Methodist Episcopal church located at Copake Falls, Columbia County, New York. It was built in 1891–1892, and is a one-story, Gothic Revival style light frame church sheathed in novelty siding. It has a steep gable roof topped by a belfry and a projecting front vestibule. The building housed a church until 1955. It houses the Roeliff Jansen Historical Society.

It was added to the National Register of Historic Places in 2012.
