= House at New Forge =

Historic house in New York, United States

- U.S. National Register of Historic Places
- Location within New York Location within the United States
- Location: 128 New Forge Rd., New Forge, New York
- Coordinates: 42°6′23″N 73°40′32″W
- Area: 12 acres (4.9 ha)
- Built: 1850
- Architectural style: Greek Revival, Vernacular Greek Revival
- NRHP reference No.: 87002143
- Added to NRHP: December 14, 1987

House at New Forge is a historic home located at New Forge in Columbia County, New York. It was built about 1850 and is a vernacular Greek Revival style residence. It features a two-story, projecting polygonal bay with a hipped roof and a large, deep veranda. Also on the property is a privy. The property includes the full extent of the 18th century industrial, commercial, and residential activities at Maryburgh Forges and the 19th century hamlet of New Forge. Within the property is the site of the 18th century iron forges, the site and foundation of the mid-to-late-19th century Livingston family manor house, the sites of several former commercial and / or residential buildings, and the site of mid-19th century grist mill, saw mill, and plaster mill.

It was added to the National Register of Historic Places in 1987.
