= Taconic =

Taconic can refer to a location in the United States:

- Taconic, Connecticut, an unincorporated community in rural Litchfield County, Connecticut
- Taconic Correctional Facility, a medium security women's prison in Bedford Hills, New York
- Taconic Golf Club, a golf course in Williamstown, Massachusetts
- Taconic Mountains, part of the Appalachian Mountains, running through eastern New York, western Connecticut, western Massachusetts, and southwestern Vermont
- Taconic orogeny, a great mountain building period within the New York Bight region in the United States
- Taconic Shores, New York, a census-designated place
- Taconic State Park, New York state
- Taconic State Parkway, part of the New York State highway system
- Taconic Biosciences, a company providing laboratory animals for research purposes

== See also ==
- Taghkanic (disambiguation)
