= New York State Route 344 =

State highway in Columbia County, New York, US

New York State Route 344
- Map of the Copake Falls area with NY 344 highlighted in red, and Reference Route 980F in blue

Route information
- Maintained by NYSDOT
- Length: 1.90 mi (3.06 km)
- Existed: c. 1932–present

Major junctions
- West end: NY 22 in Copake
- East end: Falls Road at the Massachusetts state line near Copake Falls

Location
- Country: United States
- State: New York
- Counties: Columbia

Highway system
- New York Highways; Interstate; US; State; Reference; Parkways
← NY 343	→ NY 345

New York State Route 344 (NY 344) is a state highway located in Columbia County, New York, in the United States. The route is 1.90 miles (3.06 km) in length and serves primarily as an access road to the Bash Bish Falls state parks on both sides of the New York–Massachusetts border. The western terminus of NY 344 is at NY 22 in Copake Falls. Its eastern terminus is at the Massachusetts state line, where it continues into Bash Bish Falls State Park as Falls Road. NY 344 was assigned c. 1932 and extended to its current length by 1953 after NY 22 was rerouted to bypass Copake Falls.

== Route description ==
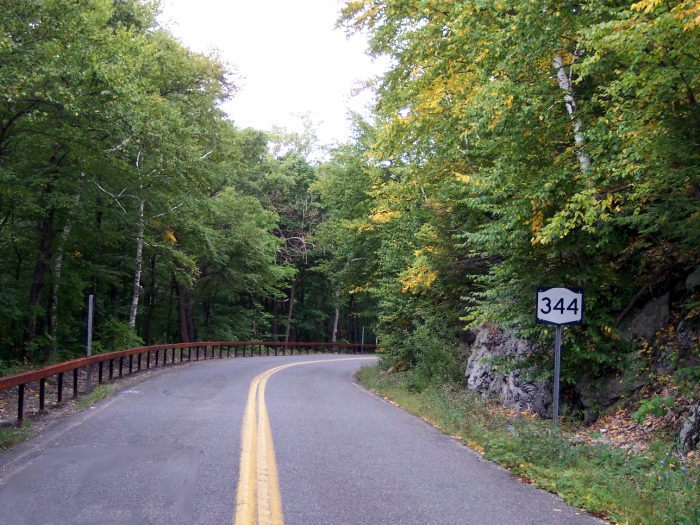
First reassurrance shield westbound on NY 344

NY 344 begins at an intersection with NY 22 in the hamlet of Copake Falls. The road heads to the southeast, turning eastward into Taconic State Park. NY 344 intersects with a few local roads at the border of the park, where it runs along the south base of Sunset Rock, an 1,800 feet (550 m) high, dual-state mountain. The route continues eastward, along the base of Cedar Mountain before beginning to ascend the mountain. While climbing Cedar Mountain, NY 344 crosses into Massachusetts and becomes the unnumbered Falls Road, a local roadway providing access to Bash Bish Falls State Park.

== History ==
NY 344 was assigned c. 1932 to a 1.52-mile-long (2.45 km) highway extending from Copake Falls in the west to the Massachusetts state line in the east. At the time, NY 22 served Copake Falls directly instead of bypassing it. NY 22 was rerouted to bypass Copake Falls on a new roadway to the west of the hamlet between 1947 and 1953. NY 344 was then extended northward on NY 22's former alignment to meet the new bypass north of Copake Falls. The southern half of NY 22's old routing into the hamlet remained state-maintained as well and is now New York State Route 980F, an unsigned reference route, and is signed on NY 22 as a southern branch of NY 344.

In August and October 1955, NY 344 and the Taconic State Park south of the road was inundated with floods damaging the blacktop surface highway. The reconstruction of NY 344 was the center point of debate came in late February 1956, where Paul Winslow, the executive secretary of the Taconic State Park Commission, who felt it was unimportant if the road was rebuilt. Local officials in the town of Copake opposed Winslow's view, noting that it only cost $35,000 (1956 USD) to reconstruct the road. In April 1956, the county contacted State Senator Ernest Hatfield that the road was barricaded in Copake Falls for the fact that there was no residences and the fact that the Massachusetts side was wiped out by the flooding. In November 1956, a bid was let for $49,329 to reconstruct NY 344 including the construction of drainage facilities and shoulders along the road. The slated completion date was for July 31, 1957. However, progress on reconstruction of NY 344 was nearly complete by March 1957.

== Major intersections ==
The entire route is in Copake, Columbia County.

mi	km	Destinations	Notes
0.00	0.00	NY 22	Western terminus; hamlet of Copake Falls
0.40	0.64	To NY 22 north	Access via NY 980F; hamlet of Copake Falls
1.90	3.06	Falls Road	Continuation into Massachusetts
1.000 mi = 1.609 km; 1.000 km = 0.621 mi
