= Copake Lake, New York =

- Census-designated place
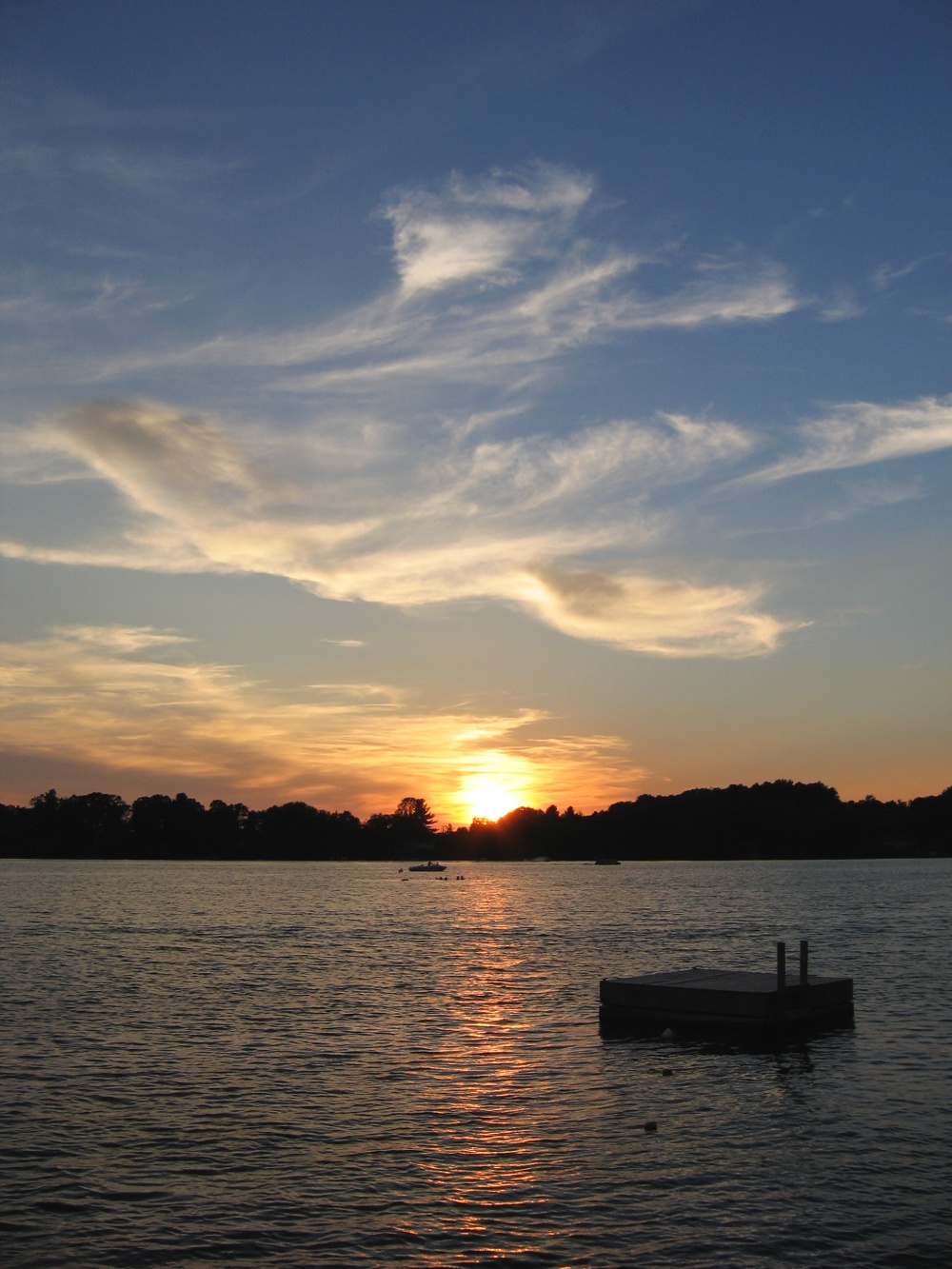
- Sunset on Copake Lake

- Location within New York Location within the United States
- Coordinates: 42°8′50″N 73°35′51″W
- Country: United States
- State: New York
- County: Columbia
- Towns: Copake, Taghkanic

Area
  - Total: 10.31 sq mi (26.71 km^{2})
  - Land: 9.50 sq mi (24.61 km^{2})
  - Water: 0.81 sq mi (2.10 km^{2})
- Elevation: 719 ft (219 m)

Population (2020)
  - Total: 767
  - Density: 80.7/sq mi (31.16/km^{2})
- Time zone: UTC-5 (Eastern (EST))
  - Summer (DST): UTC-4 (EDT)
- ZIP Codes: 12516 (Copake); 12521 (Craryville); 12529 (Hillsdale)
- FIPS code: 36-18124
- GNIS feature ID: 1852895

Copake Lake is a community (and census-designated place) in southern Columbia County, New York, United States. The population was 767 at the 2020 census.

The community is named after Copake Lake, a lake by the west town line of the town of Copake. Copake means "snake pond" in the native language.

Copake Lake is located about 95 miles (153 km) north of New York City and is an area of second homes.

== Geography ==
Copake Lake is located at 42°8′50″N 73°35′51″W (42.147128, -73.597614). The community surrounds the water body of Copake Lake, part of the Taghkanic Creek watershed flowing west to the Hudson River. Most of the CDP is in the town of Copake, while about 20% of it extends westward into the town of Taghkanic.

According to the United States Census Bureau, the CDP has a total area of 10.3 square miles (26.7 km^{2}), of which 9.5 square miles (24.6 km^{2}) is land and 0.81 square miles (2.1 km^{2}), or 7.80%, is water.

== Demographics ==
Historical population
Census	Pop.	Note	%±
2000	762		—
2010	823		8.0%
2020	767		−6.8%
U.S. Decennial Census

As of the census of 2000, there were 762 people, 302 households, and 205 families residing in the CDP. The population density was 79.4 inhabitants per square mile (30.7/km^{2}). There were 811 housing units at an average density of 84.6 per square mile (32.7/km^{2}). The racial makeup of the CDP was 96.19% White, 0.39% African American, 0.26% Native American, 0.79% from other races, and 2.36% from two or more races. Hispanic or Latino of any race were 1.57% of the population.

There were 302 households, out of which 30.5% had children under the age of 18 living with them, 54.0% were married couples living together, 8.6% had a female householder with no husband present, and 31.8% were non-families. 27.5% of all households were made up of individuals, and 9.6% had someone living alone who was 65 years of age or older. The average household size was 2.52 and the average family size was 3.02.

In the CDP, the population was spread out, with 22.7% under the age of 18, 8.3% from 18 to 24, 26.8% from 25 to 44, 29.9% from 45 to 64, and 12.3% who were 65 years of age or older. The median age was 39 years. For every 100 females, there were 104.3 males. For every 100 females age 18 and over, there were 105.9 males.
