= Copake Iron Works Historic District =

Historic district in New York, United States

- U.S. National Register of Historic Places
- U.S. Historic district
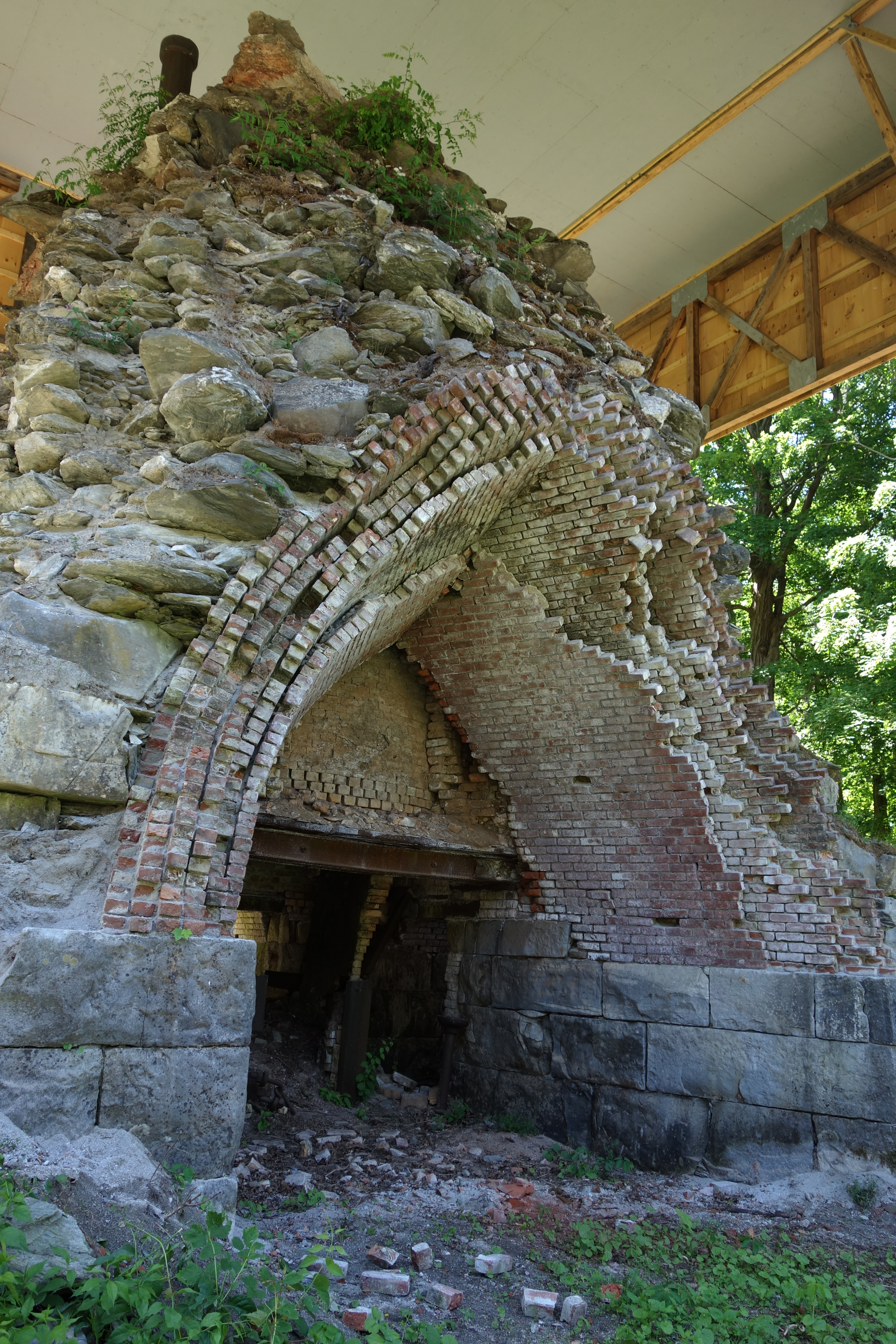
- Copake Iron Works Charcoal Blast Furnace

- Location within New York Location within the United States
- Nearest city: Taconic State Park, Copake Falls, New York
- Coordinates: 42°7′9.43″N 73°30′49.66″W
- Area: 30 acres (12 ha)
- Built: 1845
- Architectural style: Greek Revival, Picturesque
- NRHP reference No.: 07000334
- Added to NRHP: April 18, 2007

Copake Iron Works Historic District is a national historic district located at Copake Falls in Columbia County, New York. The district includes 11 contributing buildings, three contributing sites, eight contributing structures, and three contributing objects. They are associated with the remaining vestiges of the Copake Iron Works, an iron extraction and production operation established in the mid-19th century. It includes the remains of a charcoal blast furnace (ca. 1872), frame office and attached brick powder storage building, brick engine house and pattern shop, four frame workers houses, and a substantial Greek Revival dwelling. Also included in the district are a series of retaining walls, remnants of a cast-iron penstock, and a bridge abutment. Also located in the district is the previously listed Church of St. John in the Wilderness.

It was listed on the National Register of Historic Places in 2007.
