= Lake Taghkanic State Park =

State park in Columbia County, New York

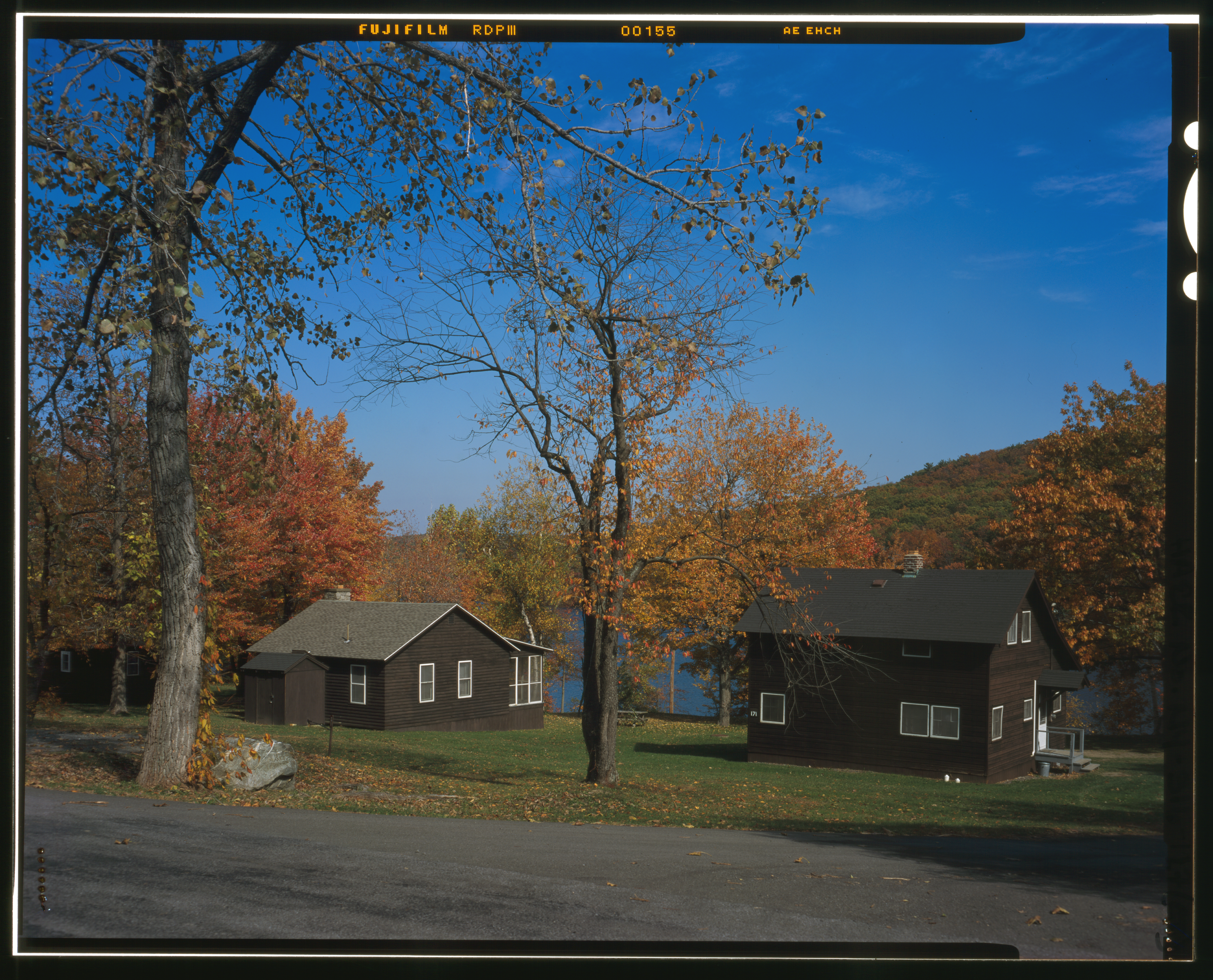
- Cabins at Lake Taghkanic State Park

- Location within New York
- Type: State park
- Location: 1528 Route 82; Ancram, New York
- Coordinates: 42°05′29″N 73°42′30″W
- Area: 1,569 acres (6.35 km^{2})
- Operator: New York State Office of Parks, Recreation and Historic Preservation
- Visitors: 259,146 (in 2014)
- Open: All year
- Website: Lake Taghkanic State Park

Lake Taghkanic State Park is a 1,569-acre (6.35 km^{2}) state park located in the southern part of Columbia County, New York in the United States. The park is on the town line between the towns of Gallatin and Taghkanic, and is adjacent to the Taconic State Parkway.

== History ==
The land for Lake Taghkanic State Park was donated to the state by D. McRae Livingston in 1929, with the requirement that Lake Charlotte's name would be changed to Lake Taghkanic. A Civilian Conservation Corps (CCC) camp was established at the park in 1933, housing laborers tasked with constructing the park's water tower, beach, bathhouse, and cabin area.

== Description ==
Lake Taghkanic State Park has tent and trailer campsites, cabins and cottages, two beaches, picnic areas, boat launch sites, rowboat, paddleboat and kayak rentals, playgrounds, sports fields, a rentable pavilion, a recreation hall, and showers. The park also offers hiking, biking, swimming, fishing, hunting, cross-country ski and snowmobile trails, ice skating, and ice fishing.

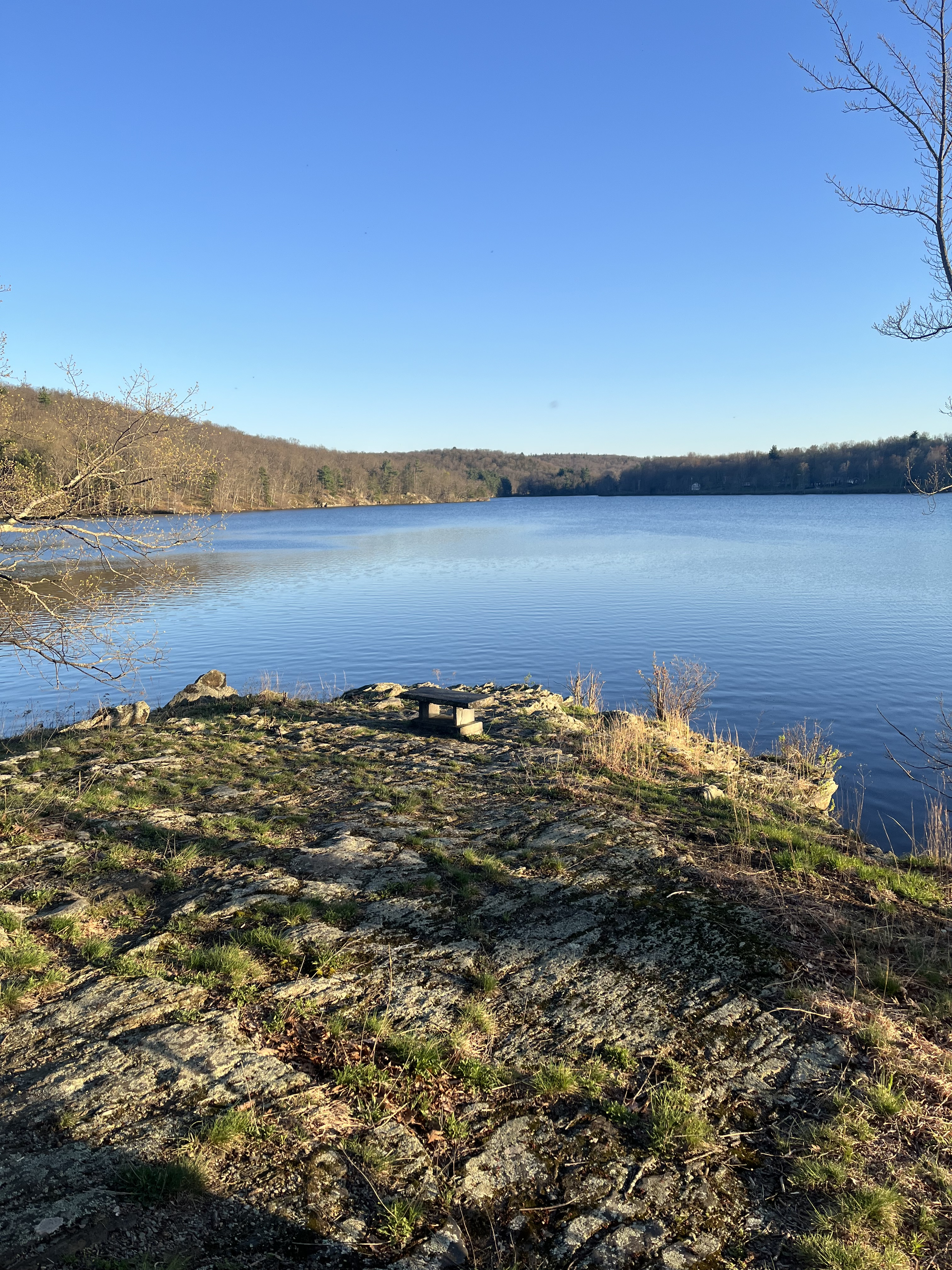
A view of the lake at Lake Taghkanic State Park.

The park's namesake is Lake Taghkanic, which covers 168 acres (0.68 km^{2}). The 1.5-mile-long (2.4 km) lake has a maximum depth of 40 feet (12 m) and an average depth of 19 feet (5.8 m).

== See also ==
- List of New York state parks
