= Taghkanic, New York =

- Town
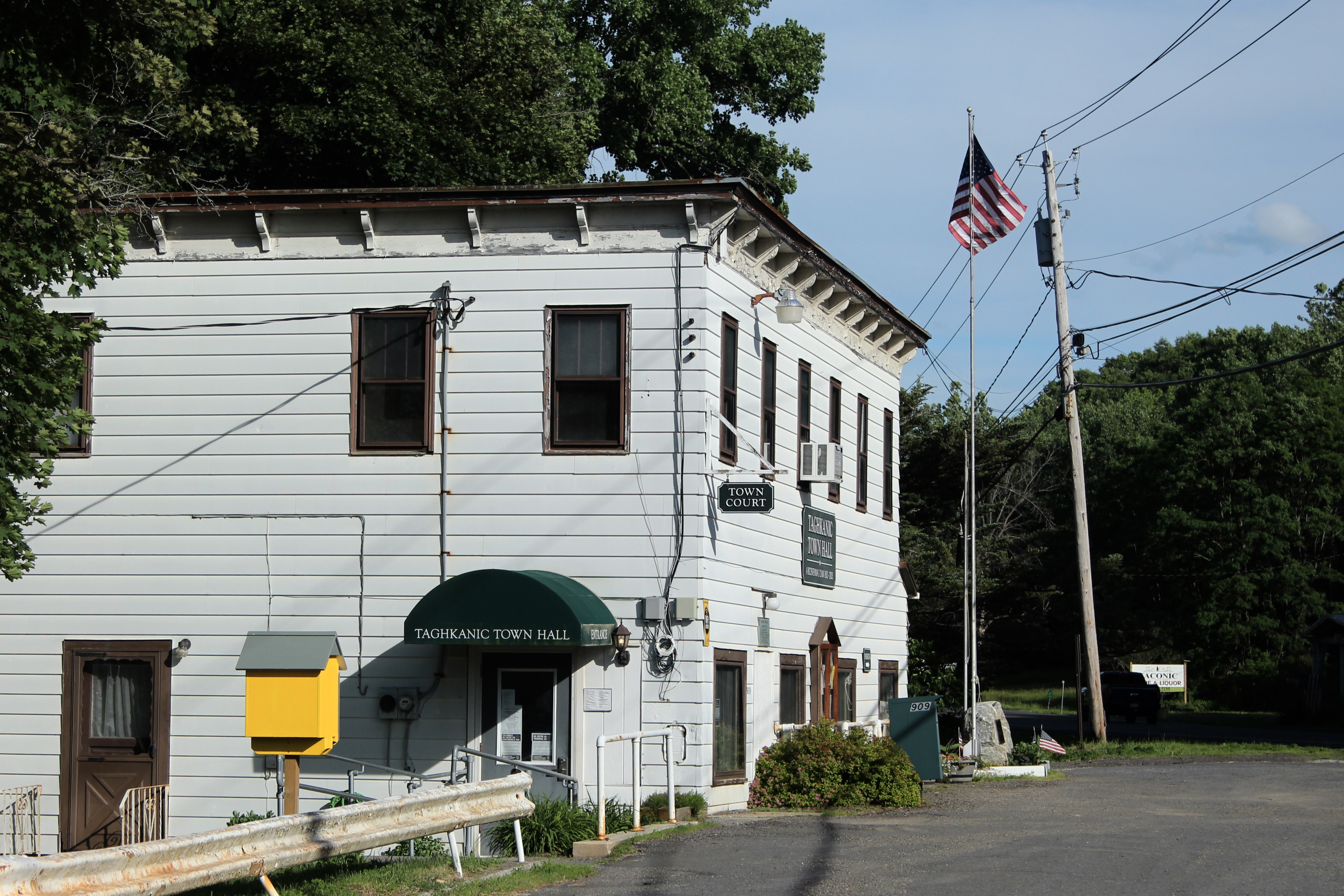
- Town hall

- Location in New York
- Coordinates: 42°8′N 73°40′W
- Country: United States
- State: New York
- County: Columbia

Government
  - Type: Town Council
  - Town Supervisor: Erik Tyree (Independence Party)
  - Town Council: Members' List: • Carolyn A. Sammons (R); • Richard A. Skoda (R); • Lawrence Kadish (D); • Joyce Thompson (D)

Area
  - Total: 40.14 sq mi (103.96 km^{2})
  - Land: 39.97 sq mi (103.53 km^{2})
  - Water: 0.17 sq mi (0.43 km^{2})
- Elevation: 564 ft (172 m)

Population (2020)
  - Total: 1,231
  - Density: 30.80/sq mi (11.89/km^{2})
- Time zone: UTC-5 (Eastern (EST))
  - Summer (DST): UTC-4 (EDT)
- ZIP Codes: 12502 (Ancram); 12521 (Craryville); 12523 (Elizaville); 12529 (Hillsdale)
- FIPS code: 36-021-73077
- GNIS feature ID: 0979540
- Website: taghkanic.gov

Taghkanic (/təˈkɑːnɪk/) is a town in Columbia County, New York, United States. The town is in the south-central part of the county. The population was 1,231, at the 2020 US census, down from 1,310 at the 2010 census. "Taghkanic" is an older spelling of "Taconic".

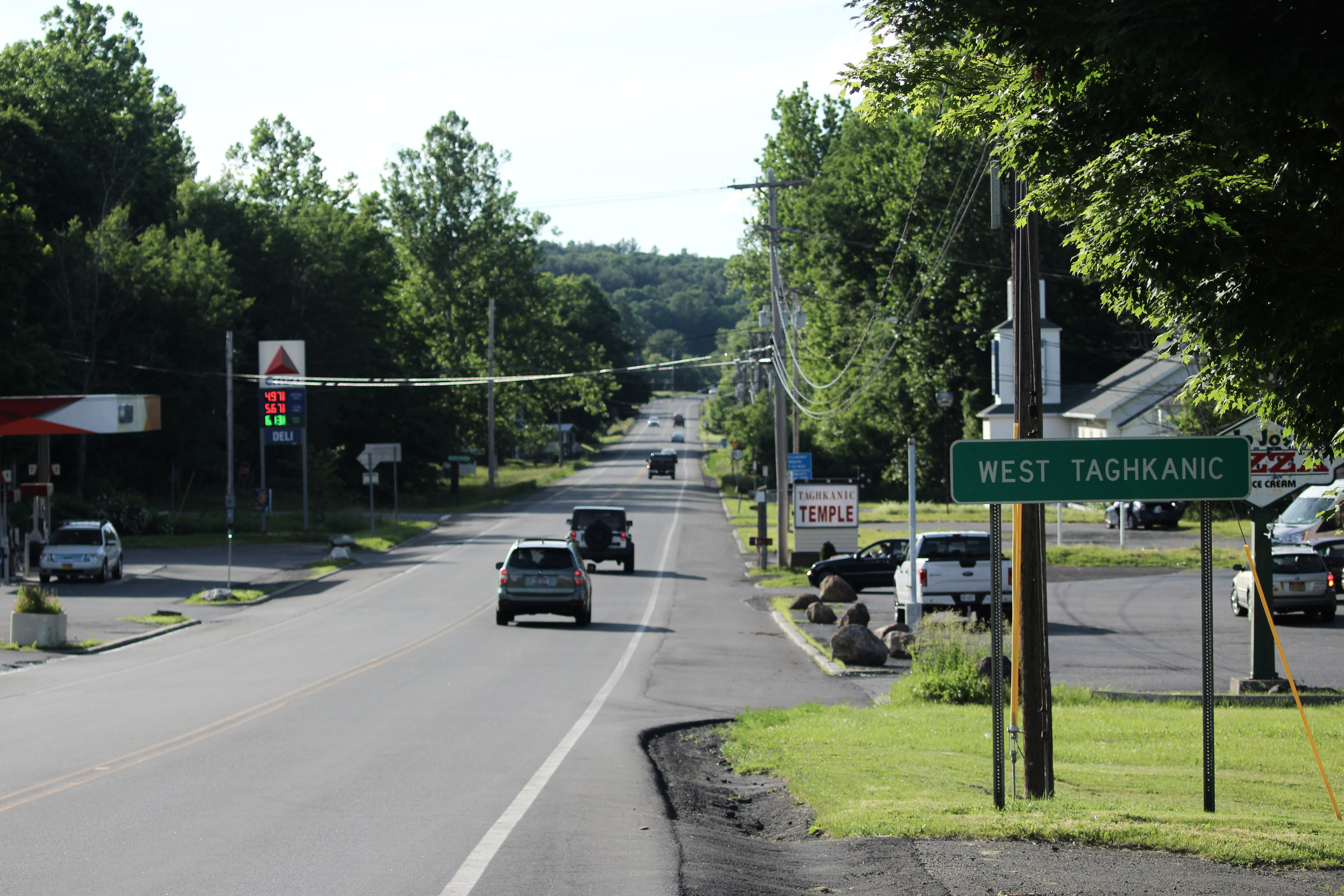
The hamlet of West Taghkanic on New York State Highway 82 in the town of Taghkanic, New York.

== History ==
Settlement began before 1700, while the region was part of Livingston Manor. The town was formed from the town of Livingston in 1803 as the town of Granger.

== Geography ==
According to the United States Census Bureau, the town has a total area of 40.2 square miles (104.0 km^{2}), of which 40.0 square miles (103.5 km^{2}) is land and 0.15 square miles (0.4 km^{2}), or 0.41%, is water. The town shares its name with Taghkanic Creek, a tributary of Claverack Creek, which runs through the town in a U shape from the northeastern corner to the northwestern corner. The town also shares its name with the Taghkanic or Taconic Mountains in the eastern section of the township.

The Taconic State Parkway passes through the town.

== Demographics ==
Historical population
Census	Pop.	Note	%±
1820	3,600		—
1830	1,654		−54.1%
1840	1,674		1.2%
1850	1,539		−8.1%
1860	1,717		11.6%
1870	1,485		−13.5%
1880	1,308		−11.9%
1890	1,062		−18.8%
1900	894		−15.8%
1910	771		−13.8%
1920	666		−13.6%
1930	683		2.6%
1940	604		−11.6%
1950	575		−4.8%
1960	727		26.4%
1970	804		10.6%
1980	1,101		36.9%
1990	1,111		0.9%
2000	1,118		0.6%
2010	1,310		17.2%
2020	1,231		−6.0%
U.S. Decennial Census 2020

As of the census of 2000, there were 1,118 people, 461 households, and 325 families residing in the town. The population density was 27.9 inhabitants per square mile (10.8/km^{2}). There were 713 housing units at an average density of 17.8 per square mile (6.9/km^{2}). The racial makeup of the town was 98.48% white, 0.63% African American, 0.18% Native American, 0.09% Asian, 0.09% from other races, and 0.54% from two or more races. Hispanic or Latino of any race were 1.07% of the population.

There were 461 households, out of which 24.1% had children under the age of 18 living with them, 60.7% were married couples living together, 6.9% had a female householder with no husband present, and 29.5% were non-families. 23.6% of all households were made up of individuals, and 9.1% had someone living alone who was 65 years of age or older. The average household size was 2.39 and the average family size was 2.82.

In the town, the population was spread out, with 20.8% under the age of 18, 3.8% from 18 to 24, 25.8% from 25 to 44, 30.8% from 45 to 64, and 19.0% who were 65 years of age or older. The median age was 45 years. For every 100 females, there were 103.6 males. For every 100 females age 18 and over, there were 103.7 males.

The median income for a household in the town was $45,804, and the median income for a family was $51,908. Males had a median income of $31,875 versus $27,375 for females. The per capita income for the town was $29,850. About 6.9% of families and 9.1% of the population were below the poverty line, including 13.0% of those under age 18 and 2.8% of those age 65 or over.

== Communities and locations in Taghkanic ==
- Churchtown – a hamlet at the town line in the northeastern part of the town.
- Copake Lake – A community (census-designated place) surrounding the namesake lake, 80% of which is located in Copake.
- East Taghkanic – a hamlet in the eastern section of the town, southeast of Taghkanic hamlet.
- Lake Taghkanic State Park – the northern part of the state park is at the southern town line.
- New Forge – a hamlet in the southern part of the town. The House at New Forge was added to the National Register of Historic Places in 1987.
- Taghkanic – eponymous hamlet near the center of the town.
- West Taghkanic – a hamlet southwest of Taghkanic hamlet. It was formerly called "Millers Corners" and "Laphams".
