= West Copake, New York =

- Hamlet
- Location within New York Location within the United States
- Coordinates: 42°05′45″N 73°34′56″W
- Country: United States
- State: New York
- County: Columbia
- Elevation: 554 ft (169 m)
- Time zone: UTC-5 (Eastern (EST))
  - Summer (DST): UTC-4 (EDT)
- Area codes: 518 & 838
- GNIS feature ID: 969184

West Copake is a hamlet in the southwestern part of the Town of Copake, in Columbia County, New York, United States. The community is 15.2 miles (24.5 km) southeast of Hudson. West Copake had a post office until September 24, 1988.

West Copake was the site of Camps Barrington, a Jewish summer camp for boys, founded in 1921, and Camp Rhoda, a sister Jewish summer camp for girls, founded in 1923. Both camps were situated next to Upper Rhoda pond and were founded by Sanford S. Bettman, a school administrator. Beginning in 1936 both camps were run by Abe Porchenick (Uncle Porky) 1908-2004 and his wife Ella as well as Gustave De Lemos (Uncle Gus) 1906-1985 and his wife Ruth until the camps closed in 1967.
