= Taghkanic Creek =

- Native name: Taughannock

Location
- Country: United States
- State: New York
- County: Columbia
- Towns: , Taghkanic, New York

Physical characteristics
- Source
  - location: Hillsdale, New York, Taconic Mountains
  - coordinates: 42°14′34″N 73°35′16″W
- Mouth: Claverack Creek
  - location: Greenport, New York
  - coordinates: 42°13′23″N 73°45′19″W
  - elevation: 121 ft (37 m)
- Length: 30 mi (48 km)

Taghkanic Creek is a 30.1-mile-long (48.4 km) tributary to Claverack Creek in Columbia County, New York, in the United States. Via Claverack Creek and Stockport Creek, it is part of the Hudson River watershed. Its source is in the town of Hillsdale, and it passes through the towns of Copake, Taghkanic, and Livingston before terminating at Claverack Creek in the town of Greenport.

== History ==
Taghkanic or Taughannock is the Native American name for this stream, meaning "forest wilderness" or "in the trees". Other sources cite the fact that the stream has its source on the opposite side of the mountain in Copake through which it flows in an underground stream.

== Tributaries ==
- Mud Creek
- Snydam Creek
- Chrysler Pond Outlet

== See also ==
- List of rivers of New York
