= Copake, New York =

- Town
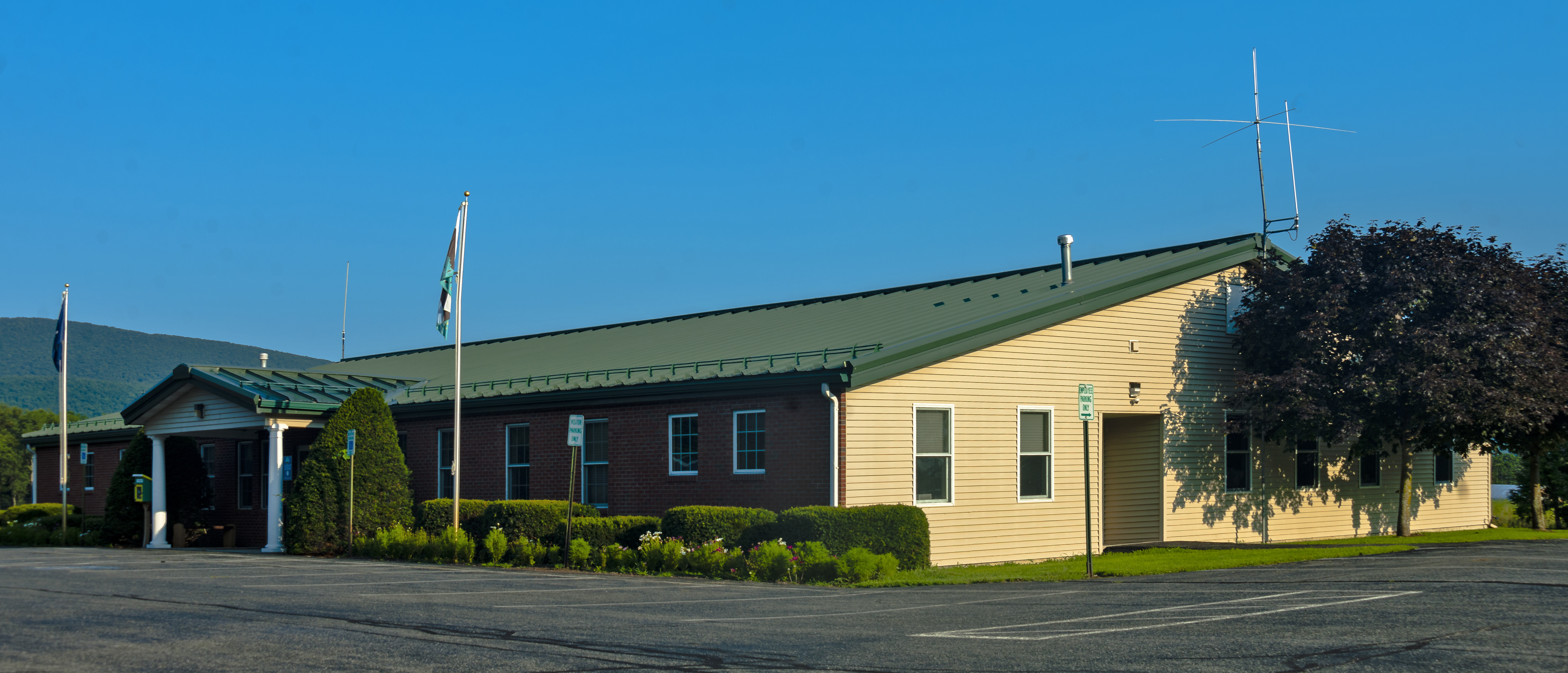
- Town hall

- Location of Copake, New York
- Coordinates: 42°8′2″N 73°34′6″W
- Country: United States
- State: New York
- County: Columbia

Government
  - Type: Town Council
  - Town Supervisor: Richard Wolf(R)
  - Town Council: Members' List: • Stanley Gansowski (R); • Jeffrey Judd (D); • Robert Haight (R); • William Morningstar (D)

Area
  - Total: 42.04 sq mi (108.88 km^{2})
  - Land: 40.77 sq mi (105.60 km^{2})
  - Water: 1.26 sq mi (3.27 km^{2})
- Elevation: 568 ft (173 m)

Population (2020)
  - Total: 3,346
  - Density: 82.06/sq mi (31.68/km^{2})
- Time zone: UTC-5 (Eastern (EST))
  - Summer (DST): UTC-4 (EDT)
- ZIP Codes: 12516 (Copake); 12517 (Copake Falls); 12521 (Craryville); 12593 (West Copake); 12502 (Ancram); 12529 (Hillsdale)
- Area code: 518
- FIPS code: 36-021-18102
- GNIS feature ID: 0978865
- Website: townofcopakeny.gov

Copake is a town in Columbia County, New York, United States. The population was 3,346 at the 2020 US census, down from 3,615 at the 2010 census. The town derives its name from a lake, which was known to the natives as Cook-pake, or Ack-kook-peek, meaning "Snake Pond".

Copake is on the eastern border of the county. Taconic State Park is along the eastern edge of the town.

== History ==
Copake was part of the 1686 Taconic Grant to Robert Livingston, for approximately 400 acres (1.6 km^{2}) of good land and 2,200 acres (8.9 km^{2}) of woodland. After it was purchased from the Indians, it turned out to be 160,000 acres (650 km^{2}), and he established the English-style Livingston Manor. The manor extended well into what is now Massachusetts. The first lease given by Livingston in Copake was for about 85 acres (340,000 m^{2}) in 1687, to Matthews Abraham Van Deusen. Because New England claimed ownership west to the Hudson River, a border dispute broke out. The Massachusetts Bay Colony laid out three townships west of the Taconic Mountains in 1755. Most of the present town of Copake was in one of the townships. New settlers were given 100 acres (0.40 km^{2}) free, and some of Livingston's tenants refused to pay rent. The border was settled in 1757 by the Lords Commissioners of Trade in London. Farmers west of the border continued to protest, however. In 1844, a rally organized by the Taconic Mutual Association took place in the center of the hamlet. After the rally, the arrest of several of the leaders sparked wider protests. Eventually the Anti-Rent Party was formed in New York state, and New York instituted land reform. The Anti-Rent Party called for a Homestead Act to develop the western land. It became part of the Republican Party platform and was important in the election of Abraham Lincoln in 1860.

The town of Copake was formed in 1824 by splitting it from the town of Granger that was renamed Taghkanic. An early industry was iron mining and smelting. In Taconic State Park adjacent to Copake Falls is the "Ore Pit", a former iron mine, now a 40-foot (12 m) deep swimming pond.

Copake is home to a handful of summer camps for adults and children and filled with other activities to do in the summer, such as swimming, hiking, biking, and water skiing. In the winter, residents and tourists can visit nearby ski mountains, such as Catamount Ski Area.

== Geography ==
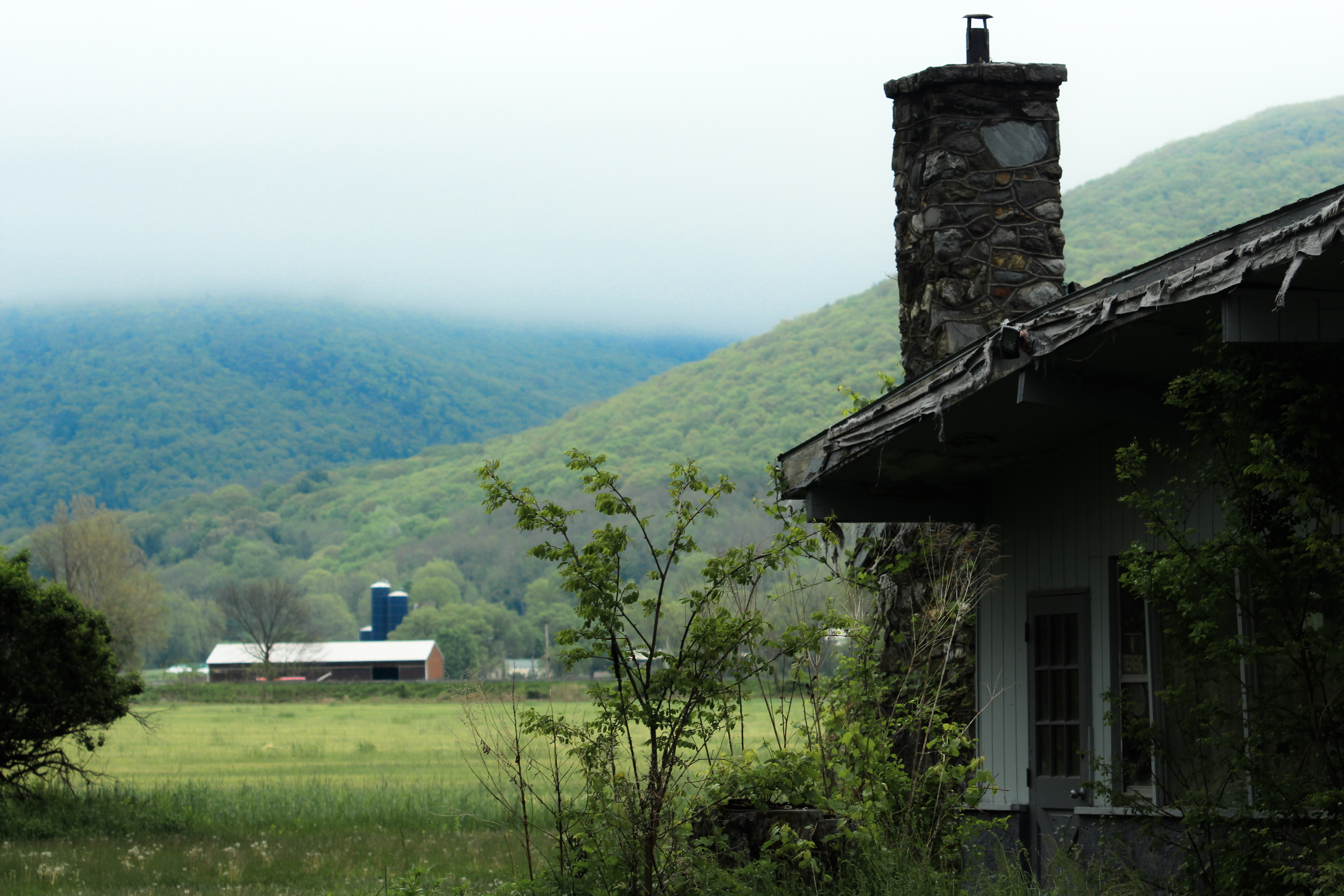
A closed business on Columbia County Route 7A and a view of the Taconic Ridge in the hamlet of Copake, New York, May 19, 2022.

According to the United States Census Bureau, the town has a total area of 42.0 square miles (108.9 km^{2}), of which 40.8 square miles (105.6 km^{2}) is land and 1.3 square miles (3.3 km^{2}), or 3.04%, is water. The largest water body is Copake Lake, touching the western border of the town, but several other lakes and ponds occupy the central and southwestern parts of the town. The Roeliff Jansen Kill flows through the center of the town, and Taghkanic Creek crosses the northwestern corner; both waterways lead west to the Hudson River.

The town is easily accessible from New York City via the Taconic State Parkway or NYS Route 22 and is a popular destination for second-home owners escaping busy Manhattan. Metro-North Railroad is also located approximately 20 minutes south of the town, with service to and from Grand Central Terminal.

The eastern town line is the border of Berkshire County, Massachusetts.

Copake is located sixteen miles from the small Massachusetts town, Great Barrington.

=== Climate ===
Climate data for Copake, New York (1991–2020)
Month	Jan	Feb	Mar	Apr	May	Jun	Jul	Aug	Sep	Oct	Nov	Dec	Year
Mean daily maximum °F (°C)	33.9 (1.1)	36.6 (2.6)	45.4 (7.4)	58.9 (14.9)	69.9 (21.1)	77.7 (25.4)	83.0 (28.3)	80.9 (27.2)	73.1 (22.8)	60.4 (15.8)	49.6 (9.8)	38.8 (3.8)	59.0 (15.0)
Daily mean °F (°C)	24.0 (−4.4)	26.0 (−3.3)	34.4 (1.3)	46.6 (8.1)	57.3 (14.1)	66.3 (19.1)	71.4 (21.9)	69.8 (21.0)	62.1 (16.7)	50.0 (10.0)	39.9 (4.4)	30.1 (−1.1)	48.2 (9.0)
Mean daily minimum °F (°C)	14.2 (−9.9)	15.4 (−9.2)	23.3 (−4.8)	34.3 (1.3)	44.7 (7.1)	55.0 (12.8)	59.8 (15.4)	58.7 (14.8)	51.0 (10.6)	39.6 (4.2)	30.3 (−0.9)	21.3 (−5.9)	37.3 (3.0)
Average precipitation inches (mm)	3.08 (78)	2.34 (59)	3.26 (83)	3.25 (83)	4.56 (116)	4.32 (110)	3.82 (97)	3.81 (97)	4.47 (114)	4.20 (107)	2.91 (74)	3.43 (87)	43.45 (1,105)
Average snowfall inches (cm)	15.5 (39)	10.0 (25)	10.0 (25)	1.8 (4.6)	0.0 (0.0)	0.0 (0.0)	0.0 (0.0)	0.0 (0.0)	0.0 (0.0)	0.0 (0.0)	1.8 (4.6)	10.5 (27)	49.6 (125.2)
Source: NOAA

== Demographics ==
Historical population
Census	Pop.	Note	%±
1830	1,675		—
1840	1,505		−10.1%
1850	1,652		9.8%
1860	1,839		11.3%
1870	1,847		0.4%
1880	1,905		3.1%
1890	1,515		−20.5%
1900	1,277		−15.7%
1910	1,283		0.5%
1920	1,114		−13.2%
1930	1,165		4.6%
1940	1,498		28.6%
1950	1,478		−1.3%
1960	1,630		10.3%
1970	2,209		35.5%
1980	2,854		29.2%
1990	3,118		9.3%
2000	3,278		5.1%
2010	3,615		10.3%
2020	3,346		−7.4%
U.S. Decennial Census

As of the census of 2000, there were 3,278 people, 1,280 households, and 869 families residing in the town. The population density was 80.0 inhabitants per square mile (30.9/km^{2}). There were 2,185 housing units at an average density of 53.3 per square mile (20.6/km^{2}). The racial makeup of the town was 96.55% White, 0.70% African American, 0.46% Native American, 0.12% Asian, 0.58% from other races, and 1.59% from two or more races. Hispanic or Latino of any race were 2.29% of the population.

There were 1,280 households, out of which 27.2% had children under the age of 18 living with them, 54.3% were married couples living together, 8.4% had a female householder with no husband present, and 32.1% were non-families. 25.9% of all households were made up of individuals, and 11.7% had someone living alone who was 65 years of age or older. The average household size was 2.45 and the average family size was 2.89.

In the town, the population was spread out, with 21.4% under the age of 18, 6.1% from 18 to 24, 28.1% from 25 to 44, 26.2% from 45 to 64, and 18.3% who were 65 years of age or older. The median age was 42 years. For every 100 females, there were 104.7 males. For every 100 females age 18 and over, there were 101.5 males.

The median income for a household in the town was $42,261, and the median income for a family was $46,544. Males had a median income of $32,004 versus $25,341 for females. The per capita income for the town was $23,088. About 6.5% of families and 8.1% of the population were below the poverty line, including 11.8% of those under age 18 and 4.5% of those age 65 or over.

== Communities and locations in Copake ==
- Camphill Village – A therapeutic community for developmentally disabled adults.
- Copake (formerly "Copake Flats") – The hamlet of Copake is in the southern part of the town.
- Copake Falls – A hamlet north of Copake village.
- Copake Iron Works – A former community in the town, now in Taconic State Park.
- Copake Lake – A lake on the western town line and a community (census-designated place) surrounding the lake, 20% of which extends into Taghkanic.
- Craryville (formerly "Bains Corner") – A hamlet in the northwestern part of the town.
- Taconic Shores – A community (property owners association) northwest of Copake hamlet, encircling Robinson Pond.
- Taconic State Park – covering the Taconic Mountains along the eastern edge of the town.
- Weedmines – A location at the southern town line. West Copake (formerly "Andersons Corners") – A hamlet in the southwestern part of the town and southwest of Copake village.
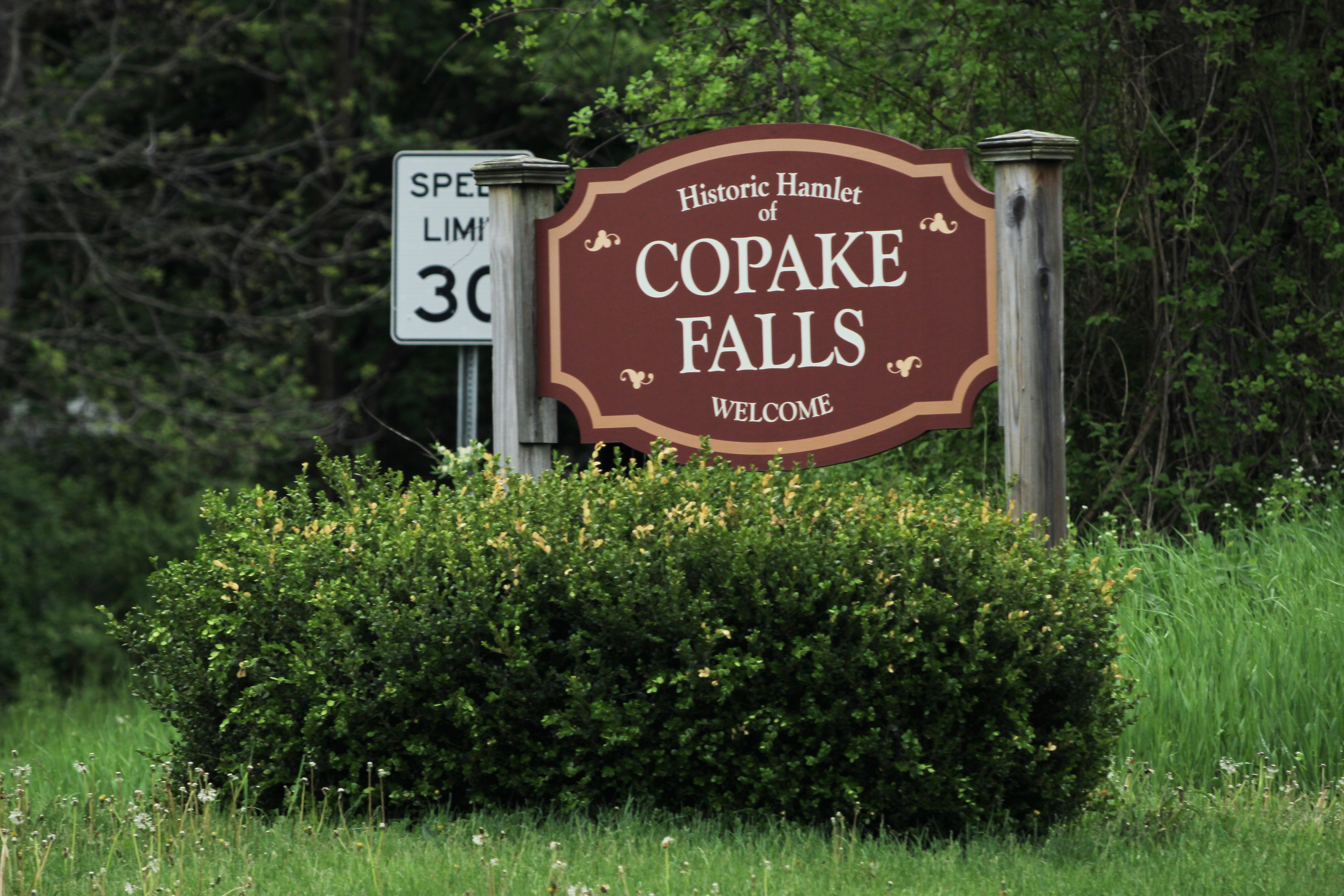
  A sign for Copake Falls near NY-22 in the town of Copake, New York, May 19, 2022.

== Notable people ==
- Henry Astor had a home in West Copake.
- Mariah Carey had a home in Craryville, in the northwestern part of the town. The music video for her 1993 single "Dreamlover" was also filmed in the town and surrounding area.
- Nancy Fuller, chef and host of Farmhouse Rules on the Food Network, has a dairy farm here with her husband, David.
- Katharine Lente Stevenson (1853–1919), temperance reformer, missionary, editor
