= Francis Forshew =

Francis "Frank" Forshew
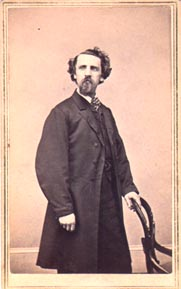
- Born: March 1, 1827; Columbia County, New York, U.S.
- Died: August 4, 1895 (aged 68); Brooklyn, New York
- Occupation: Photographer
- Spouse: Mary J.

Signature
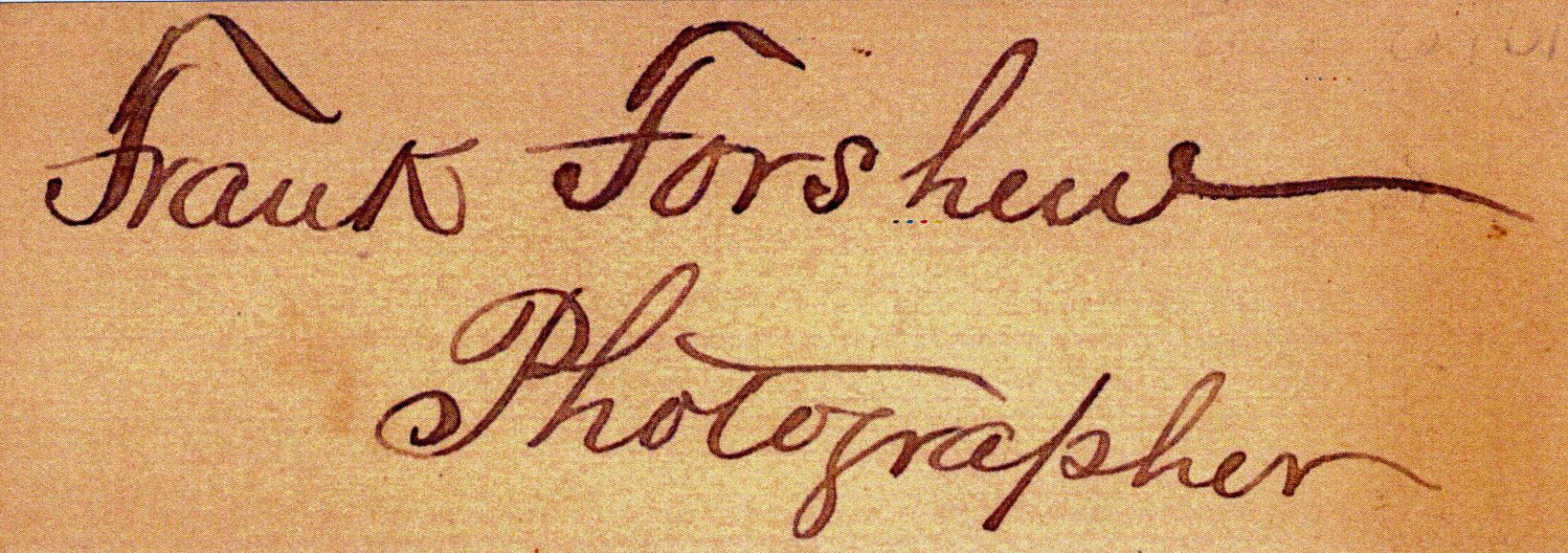

Francis Forshew (March 1, 1827 – August 4, 1895) was a 19th-century photographer based in upstate New York. Though not as well known or famous as his peer of the times, Mathew Brady, Forshew was just as prolific and served a very large customer base for many years.

== Early years ==
Forshew was born in Hudson, New York on March 1, 1827. His father was a schoolteacher and former sea captain. Forshew married Mary J. Hildreth in 1850; the couple had five children and adopted one other.

== Photography ==
Forshew Business Newspaper Advertisement, October 1851

Photographer Frank Forshew established his photography business in 1850. Located in a small city of the banks of the Hudson River in upstate New York, his business thrived. The stages and growth of his business included the following types of photography:

Craig's Daguerrian Registry includes the following entry indicating Forshew's start in the field:

Listed as a daguereian, Hudson, N.Y., and New York City, N.Y. This is probably the Forshew identified as being in New York City, N.Y, in 1850, from identification on a quarter-plate daguereotype. From 1851 to 1859 he was listed in Hudson, N.Y. In 1851-1852 he was listed at 237 Warren Street, with his residence at 9 Front Street. He was listed in partnership as Turck (J.) and Forshew. In 1852-1853 he was listed at the same location. In 1856-1857 he was listed alone at 237 Warren Street and 305-1/2 Warren Street, with his residence at 237 Warren Street. In 1859 he was listed at 237 Warren Street only. Identified image dated 1855.

An advertisement of the period specifically lists the Daguerreotype method as being used by Forshew in 1851

Forshew also worked with tintype photography during this period. He created "carte de visite" (visiting cards), cabinet cards, and stereoviews. Forshew did a brisk business during the Civil War providing cartes de visite to transient soldiers as well as to the families and friends on the home front who wanted to send their images to soldiers away from home on the battlefronts. After the war,

== Later years ==
After many years in business Forshew sold or passed along the establishment to one of his employees, Captain Volkert Whitbeck, who joined Forshew's business after being discharged from a Union regiment during the Civil War in 1863. Volkert later would take over Forshew's photography business in the early 1890s.

Forshew died on August 8, 1895, in Brooklyn, New York, aged 68. His obituaries noted the cause as either a paralytic stroke or apoplexy.

He is buried in the Hudson City Cemetery, Hudson, New York.

== Gallery ==
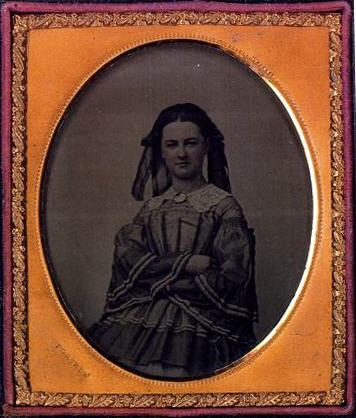
Forshew daguerreotype, undated

Forshew Tintype, dated 1860

Forshew carte de visite, undated

Forshew carte de visite, undated

Forshew Cabinet Card, dated 1880

Forshew Stereo View (front), dated 1873

Forshew Stereo View (back), dated 1873

Forshew Civil War carte de visite

Forshew Civil War carte de visite

== See also ==
- Photographers of the American Civil War
