= Claverack Creek =

Claverack Creek Twastaweekak
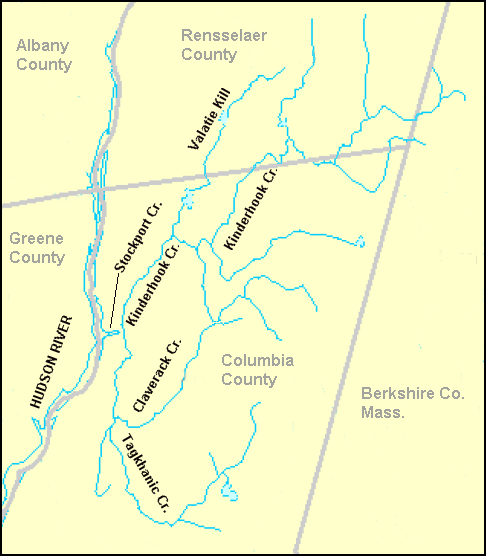
- Main branches of Claverack Creek and Kinderhook Creek
- Native name: To-was-ta-we-kak (Mahican)

Location
- Country: United States
- State: New York
- County: Columbia
- Towns: , Stottville, New York, Claverack, New York

Physical characteristics
- Source
  - location: Mellenville, New York
  - coordinates: 42°15′00″N 73°40′12″W
- Mouth: Stockport Creek
  - location: Stockport, New York
  - coordinates: 42°19′02″N 73°44′44″W
  - elevation: 7 ft (2.1 m)

Claverack Creek is a 17.5-mile-long (28.2 km) tributary to Stockport Creek in Columbia County, New York, in the United States. Its source is in the town of Claverack at the hamlet of Mellenville, and its mouth is at its confluence with Kinderhook Creek to form Stockport Creek, in the town of Stockport.

== History ==
The lower Claverack Creek was known as Twastawekak (To-was-ta-we-kak or Twastaweekak) by the Native American Mahican tribe, while the upper creek was named Ska-an-kook or Skaanpook.

== Tributaries ==
- Fitting Creek
  - Widows Creek
- Mud Creek
- Taghkanic Creek
  - Mud Creek
  - Snydam Creek
  - Chrysler Pond Outlet
- Loomis Creek
- Hollowville Creek
- North Creek
- Agawamuck Creek

== See also ==
- List of rivers of New York
