= Copake Falls, New York =

Hamlet and census-designated place in New York, US

- Hamlet & Census-designated place
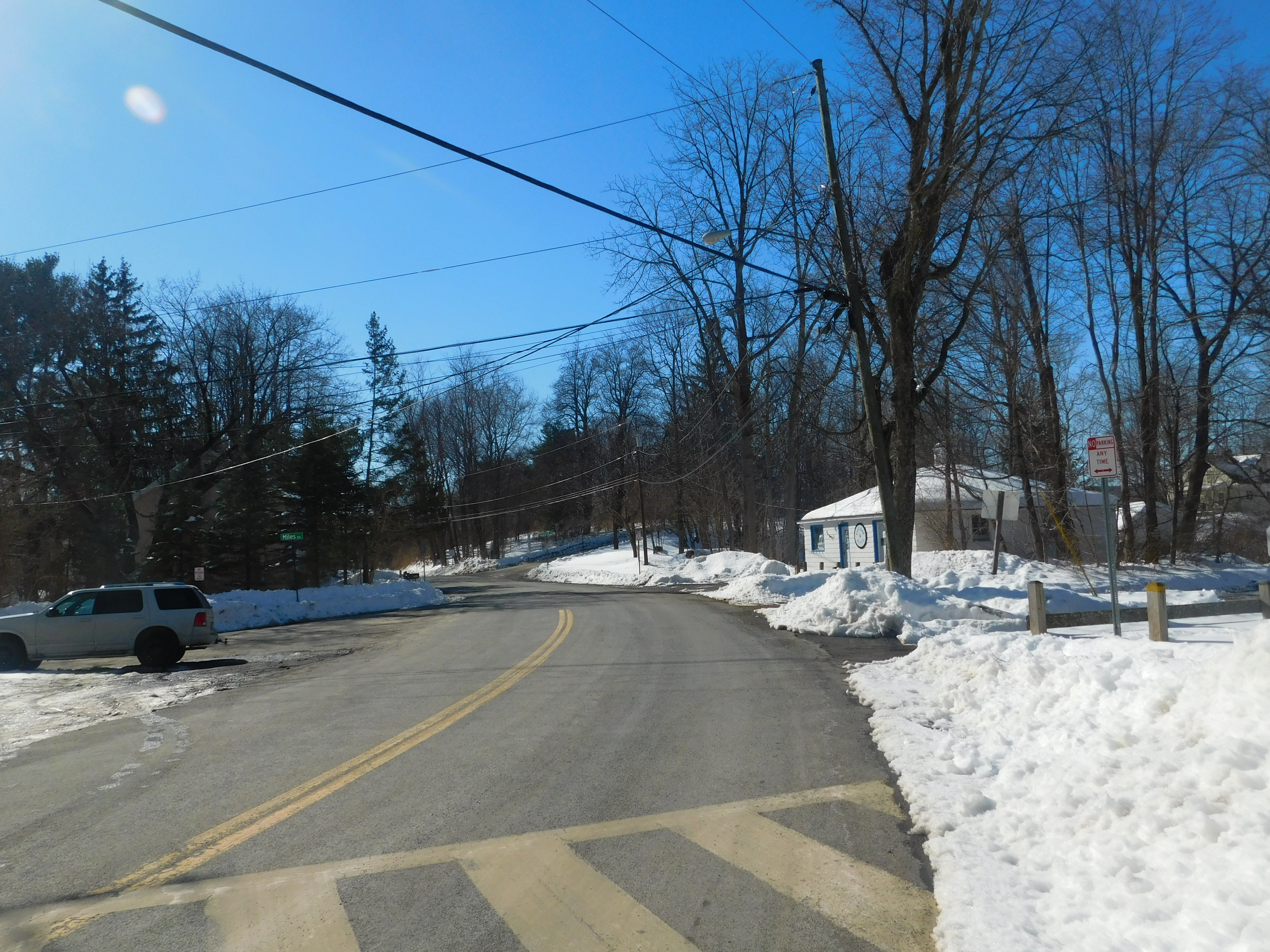
- New York State Route 344 in Copake Falls.

- Location within the state of New York
- Coordinates: 42°7′10″N 73°31′30″W
- Country: United States
- State: New York
- County: Columbia
- Town: Copake

Area
  - Total: 0.22 sq mi (0.58 km^{2})
  - Land: 0.22 sq mi (0.58 km^{2})
  - Water: 0 sq mi (0.00 km^{2})
- Elevation: 650 ft (200 m)

Population (2020)
  - Total: 181
  - Density: 808.5/sq mi (312.16/km^{2})
- Time zone: UTC-5 (Eastern (EST))
  - Summer (DST): UTC-4 (EDT)
- ZIP code: 12517
- FIPS code: 36-18113
- GNIS code: 0947409

Copake Falls is a hamlet and census-designated place (CDP) in Columbia County, New York, United States. The hamlet, once known as Copake Iron Works, is in the eastern part of the town of Copake, 1.5 miles (2.4 km) west of the Massachusetts state line. The CDP was designated after the 2010 census. As of the 2020 census, Copake Falls had a population of 181.

The former Copake Falls Methodist Episcopal Church was added to the National Register of Historic Places in 2012.

== Geography ==
Copake Falls is located along Bashbish Brook at the western foot of the Taconic Mountains, a range that runs along the New York-Massachusetts border. The Copake Falls area of Taconic State Park, with campsites and hiking trails, is directly east of the hamlet, and Bash Bish Falls, the highest waterfall in Massachusetts, is located 2 miles (3 km) to the east via New York State Route 344.

A portion of the hamlet comprises the Copake Iron Works Historic District, part of the National Register of Historic Places.

New York State Route 22 forms the western edge of the Copake Falls CDP and leads north 4 miles (6 km) to Hillsdale and south 2 miles (3 km) to Copake hamlet.

According to the United States Census Bureau, the Copake Falls CDP has a total area of 0.22 square miles (0.58 km^{2}), all land.

== Demographics ==
Historical population
Census	Pop.	Note	%±
2020	181		—
U.S. Decennial Census

== See also ==
- Copake Iron Works Historic District
- Taconic State Park
