= Stockport Creek =

Stream in the U.S. state of New York

Stockport Creek is a 2.4-mile-long (3.9 km) tributary to the Hudson River in the town of Stockport, New York, in the United States. Its source is the confluence of Kinderhook Creek and Claverack Creek near the village of Stockport. Its mouth is at the Hudson River at the western boundary of Stockport. The creek is tidal for about one mile inland from the Hudson River.

== History ==
The creek was previously known as Major Abrams (Staats) Kill or Creek, after the early New Netherlands colonist.

== Fish ==
The three mile stretch of Stockport Creek holds important spawning ground for the Hudson River's anadromous fish such as Blueback Herring, Alewives, Striped Bass, American Shad, White Perch, Smelt, Atlantic Sturgeon and Shortnose Sturgeon. Some spawning fish travel as far up to spawn as Claverack and Kinderhook creek. The tidal mudflats and littoral zones at the mouth of the river also host feeding grounds for Striped bass. They also act as a nursery area for juvenile migratory fishes. There is a large concentration of smallmouth bass in Stockport creek.

== Tributaries ==
- Kinderhook Creek
- Claverack Creek

== See also ==
- List of rivers of New York
