= Copake (CDP), New York =

Hamlet and census-designated place in New York, US

Copake, New York
- Hamlet & Census-designated place
- Location within New York Location within the United States
- Coordinates: 42°6′11″N 73°32′59″W
- Country: United States
- State: New York
- County: Columbia
- Town: Copake

Area
  - Total: 1.24 sq mi (3.20 km^{2})
  - Land: 1.24 sq mi (3.20 km^{2})
  - Water: 0 sq mi (0.00 km^{2})
- Elevation: 550 ft (170 m)

Population (2020)
  - Total: 318
  - Density: 257.7/sq mi (99.51/km^{2})
- Time zone: UTC-5 (Eastern (EST))
  - Summer (DST): UTC-4 (EDT)
- ZIP Code: 12516
- FIPS code: 36-18091
- GNIS code: 0947408

Copake is a hamlet and census-designated place (CDP) in Columbia County, New York, United States. The hamlet is in the south-central part of the town of Copake. The CDP was designated after the 2010 census.

The area was once known as Copake Flats.

The Copake Memorial Clock was added to the National Register of Historic Places in 2012.

== Geography ==
Copake is located in a flat valley along Bashbish Brook at the western foot of the Taconic Mountains, a range that runs along the New York-Massachusetts border. The hamlet of Copake Falls is 2 miles (3 km) to the northeast, and Copake Lake is 5 miles (8 km) via road to the northwest. New York State Route 22 passes about 0.5 miles (0.8 km) to the east of Copake Hamlet, leading north 5 miles (8 km) to Hillsdale and south 11 miles (18 km) to Millerton.

According to the United States Census Bureau, the Copake Hamlet CDP has a total area of 0.81 square miles (2.1 km^{2}), all land.

== Demographics ==
Historical population
Census	Pop.	Note	%±
2020	318		—
U.S. Decennial Census
