= Roeliff Jansen Kill =

River in New York, US

Roeliff Jansen Kill Ancram Creek, Livingstons Creek
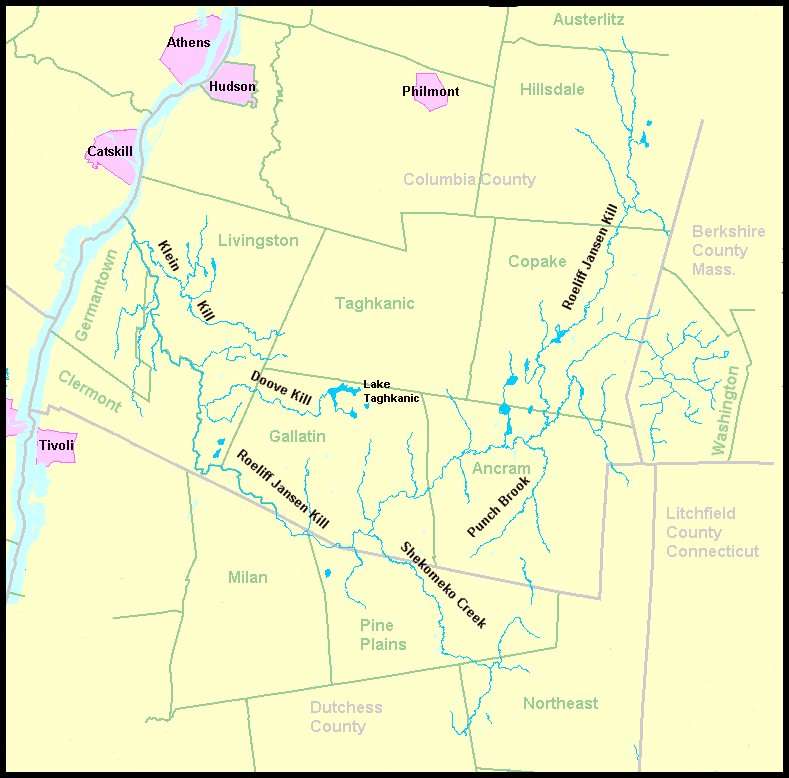
- Roeliff Jansen Kill map
- Native name: Sank-he-nak (Algonquian languages)

Location
- Country: United States
- State: New York
- County: Columbia, Dutchess
- Towns: Livingston

Physical characteristics
- Source
  - location: Chatham, NY
  - coordinates: 42°16′45″N 73°30′40″W
- Mouth: Hudson River
  - location: Livingston, New York
  - coordinates: 42°10′49″N 73°51′33″W
  - elevation: 0 ft (0 m)
- Length: 56 mi (90 km)

The Roeliff Jansen Kill is a major tributary to the Hudson River. Roeliff Jansen Kill was the traditional boundary between the Native American Mahican and Wappinger tribes.

Its source is in the town of Austerlitz, New York, and its mouth is at the Hudson River at Linlithgo in the town of Livingston. The stream flows for 56.2 miles (90.4 km) through Dutchess and Columbia counties before entering the Hudson River about 5 miles (8.0 km) south of Hudson.

Most of the watershed lies in Columbia County, although parts of the northern Dutchess County towns of North East, Stanford, Pine Plains, Milan, and Red Hook are within the stream's watershed of approximately 212 square miles (550 km^{2}). A major tributary is Shekomeko Creek.

== Tributaries ==
- Klein Kill
- Doove Kill
- Fall Kill
- Ham Brook
- Shekomeko Creek - Native American Che-co-min-go, "place of eels".
  - Bean River
- Punch Brook
- Noster Kill
  - Preechey Hollow Brook
- Bashbish Brook
  - Cedar Brook
  - Wright Brook
  - City Brook
    - Guilder Brook
  - Ashley Hill Brook
    - Lee Pond Brook
- Green River

== History ==
=== Roeliff Jansen ===
Both Roeliff Jansen Kill and Roeliff Jansen Park outside Hillsdale, NY, were named after Roeliff Jansen. However, Roeloff Jansz was not an uncommon name.

According to popular belief, the Roeloff Jansen for whom the stream is named was Roeloff Jansen (1602-1637), born on the island of Marstrand in Bohuslän, Sweden. In 1623, Jansen married Anneke Jans (1605-1663) who was from Flekkeroy, in Vest Agder, Norway. Following the birth of their first three children, they emigrated to New Netherland in 1630. The couple settled in first Rensselaerwyck near what is now Albany, New York, where Jansen had an engagement as a tenant farmer for Kiliaen Van Rensselaer. Eventually he rose to became an alderman in the Manor of Rensselaerswyck. By one account, he and some others were returning from New Amsterdam one winter when their boat became icebound for several days. They crossed the ice to shore and exploring the area, discovered the stream. They named it after the highest ranking member of the party, who was the alderman. About 1634, he moved his family to New Amsterdam where he acquired a 62-acre farm on Manhattan Island, today in the Tribeca area of lower Manhattan. After his death, his widow married Domine Everardus Bogardus.

Willem Frijhoff points out the lack of evidence for the connection of the name Roeloff Janssen Kill to Roeloff Janssen of Marstrand. Frijhoff suggests the name could just as well have come from Roelof Jansz Haes, a Norwegian who arrived in New Netherland in 1643 who is mentioned as a trader in Beverwijk in 1654. The area is first documented with the name Roeloff Janssen Kill in 1680; no earlier documentation has yet been uncovered.

New York State Route 9G crosses the stream via the Roeliff Jansen Kill Bridge (also known as the Linlithgo Bridge), built in 1932.

Roeliff Jansen Park, in the town of Hillsdale, New York, is named after him. The Roeliff Jansen Community Library, which also serves the towns of Ancram, Copake, and Hillsdale.

=== Livingston Manor ===
In 1699, Robert Livingston built the manor house of Livingston Manor at Linlithgo at the mouth of the Roeloff Jansen Kill, where it flows into the Hudson. After his death, the stream formed a boundary between the manor left to his son Philip, and the estate created for his son Robert. In 1743, Philip Livingston, grandson of Robert, founded the Livingston Forge on the banks of the Roeliff Jansen Kill at "Scotchtown", later called Ancram after the town in Scotland where the Livingstons originated. It was at the Ancram iron works that the "Fort Montgomery Chain" was forged in 1776. The chain was placed across the Hudson River near West Point between Fort Montgomery and Fort Clinton, to keep the British fleet from sailing up the Hudson. In 1854, the foundry became a paper mill. Paper manufacturer Schweitzer-Mauduit International operates a plant at that location.

== See also ==
- List of rivers of New York
