= Columbia County, New York =

County in New York, United States

- County
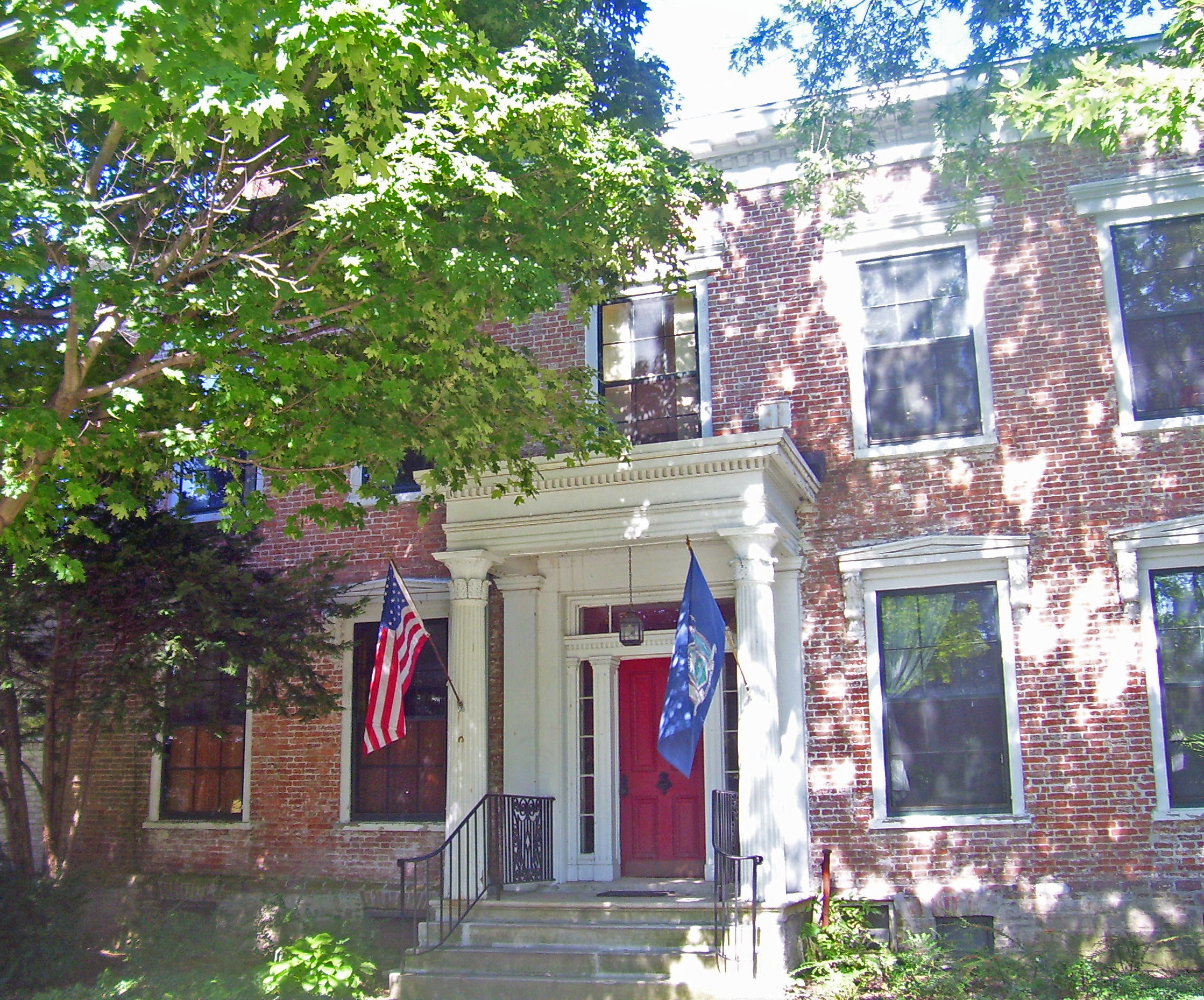
- First Columbia County Courthouse in Claverack

- Flag Seal

- Location within the U.S. state of New York
- Coordinates: 42°15′N 73°38′W
- Country: United States
- State: New York
- Founded: April 4, 1786; 240 years ago (Note: "As a county Columbia was set off from Albany on April 4, 1786.")
- Named for: Columbia
- Seat: Hudson
- Largest city: Kinderhook

Area
  - Total: 648 sq mi (1,680 km^{2})
  - Land: 635 sq mi (1,640 km^{2})
  - Water: 14 sq mi (36 km^{2}) 2.1%

Population (2020)
  - Total: 61,570
  - Estimate (2025): 60,168 ▼
  - Density: 97.0/sq mi (37.4/km^{2})
- Time zone: UTC−5 (Eastern)
  - Summer (DST): UTC−4 (EDT)
- Congressional district: 19th
- Website: www.columbiacountyny.com

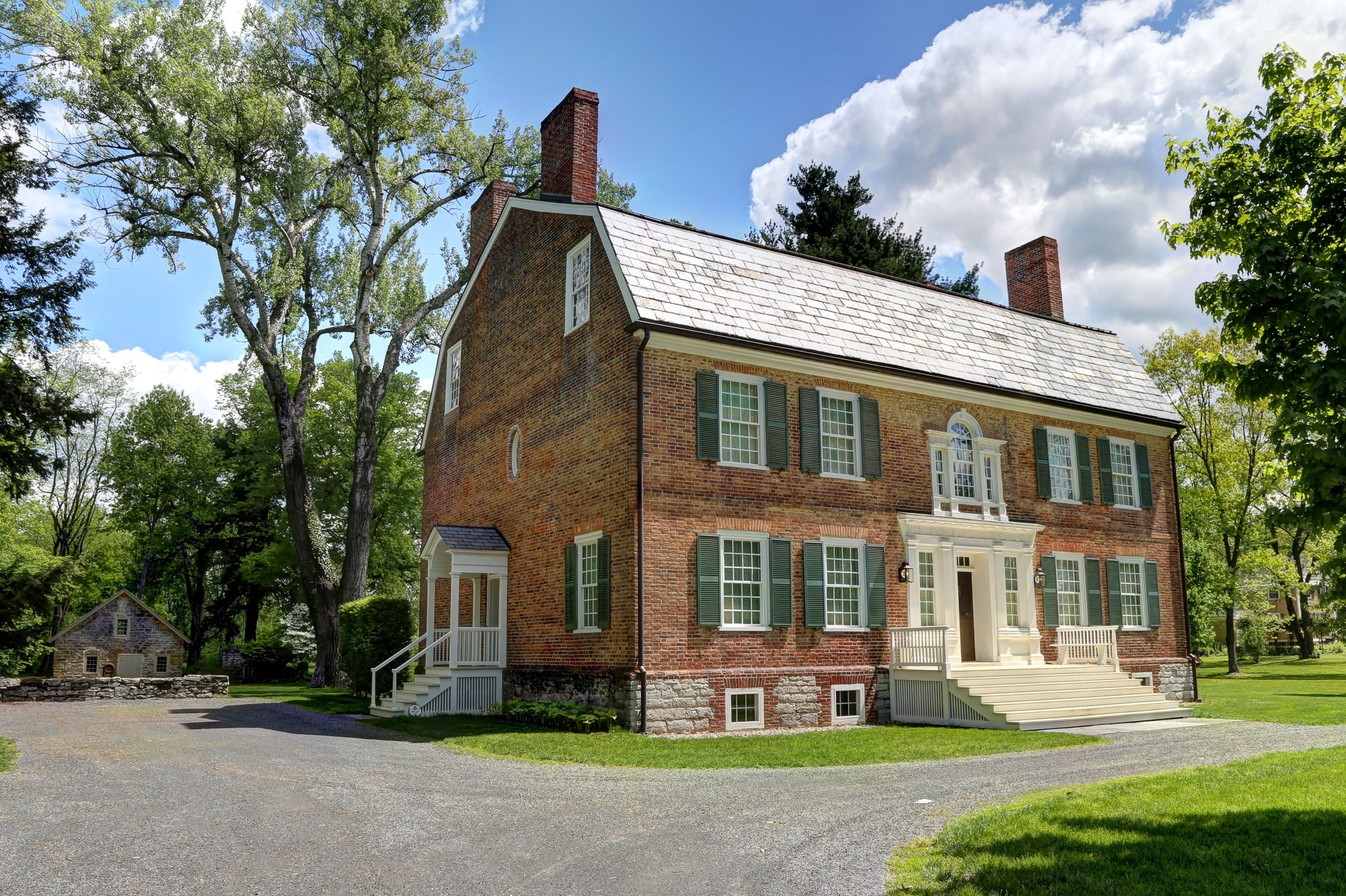
William Henry Ludlow House, built in 1786, Hudson, NY

Columbia County is a county in the U.S. state of New York. At the 2020 census, the population was 61,570. The county seat is Hudson. The name comes from the Latin feminine form of the surname of Christopher Columbus, which was at the time of the formation of the county a popular proposal for the name of the United States. The county is part of the Capital District region of the state.

== History ==
At the arrival of European colonists the area was inhabited by the indigenous Mohican Indians. To the west of the river were the Mohawk and other four tribes of the Iroquois Confederacy, extending past what is now the border of New York state. The first known European exploration of Columbia County was in 1609, when Henry Hudson, an English explorer sailing for the Dutch, ventured up the Hudson River. An accident to his craft forced him to stop at what is now known as Columbia County and there search for food and supplies. In 1612, the Dutch established trading posts and minor settlements, building New Amsterdam (now New York City) and Fort Orange (now Albany). Fort Orange became a center of the fur trade with the Mohawk people. Traders stopped at points along the Hudson River on their travels between New Amsterdam and Fort Orange; small settlements arose along the river to supply the traders' ships.

Dutch colonists settled near Claverack in 1649 and 1667. As more Dutch arrived, the region slowly developed. In 1664, the English took over New Netherland and renamed it the "Province of New York"; they also renamed Fort Orange "Albany".

In the late 17th century, Robert Livingston, a Scots immigrant by way of Rotterdam, built on his connections as Indian agent in the colony and purchased two large tracts from the Native Americans. He gained much larger grants from the provincial government, for a total of 160,240 acres. He was made lord of Livingston Manor by the Crown, with all its perquisites, and developed the property with tenant farmers. In 1710, he sold 6,000 acres of his property to Queen Anne of Great Britain for use as work camps and for the resettlement of Palatine German refugees. Some 1,200 Palatine Germans were brought to Livingston Manor (now Germantown). They were promised land for resettlement after completing their terms of indenture. They were refugees from years of religious fighting along the border with France, as well as crop failures from a severe winter. The Crown had supported their passage to New York, and they were to pay off the cost by indentured labor. New York's Governor Hunter had also helped with these arrangements: the workers were to make naval stores (e.g., pitch, resin, and turpentine) from the pine trees in the Catskill Mountains.

Work camps were established on both sides of the Hudson River. The Germans quickly established Protestant churches at the heart of their community, which recorded their weddings, births and deaths, among the first vital records kept in the colony.

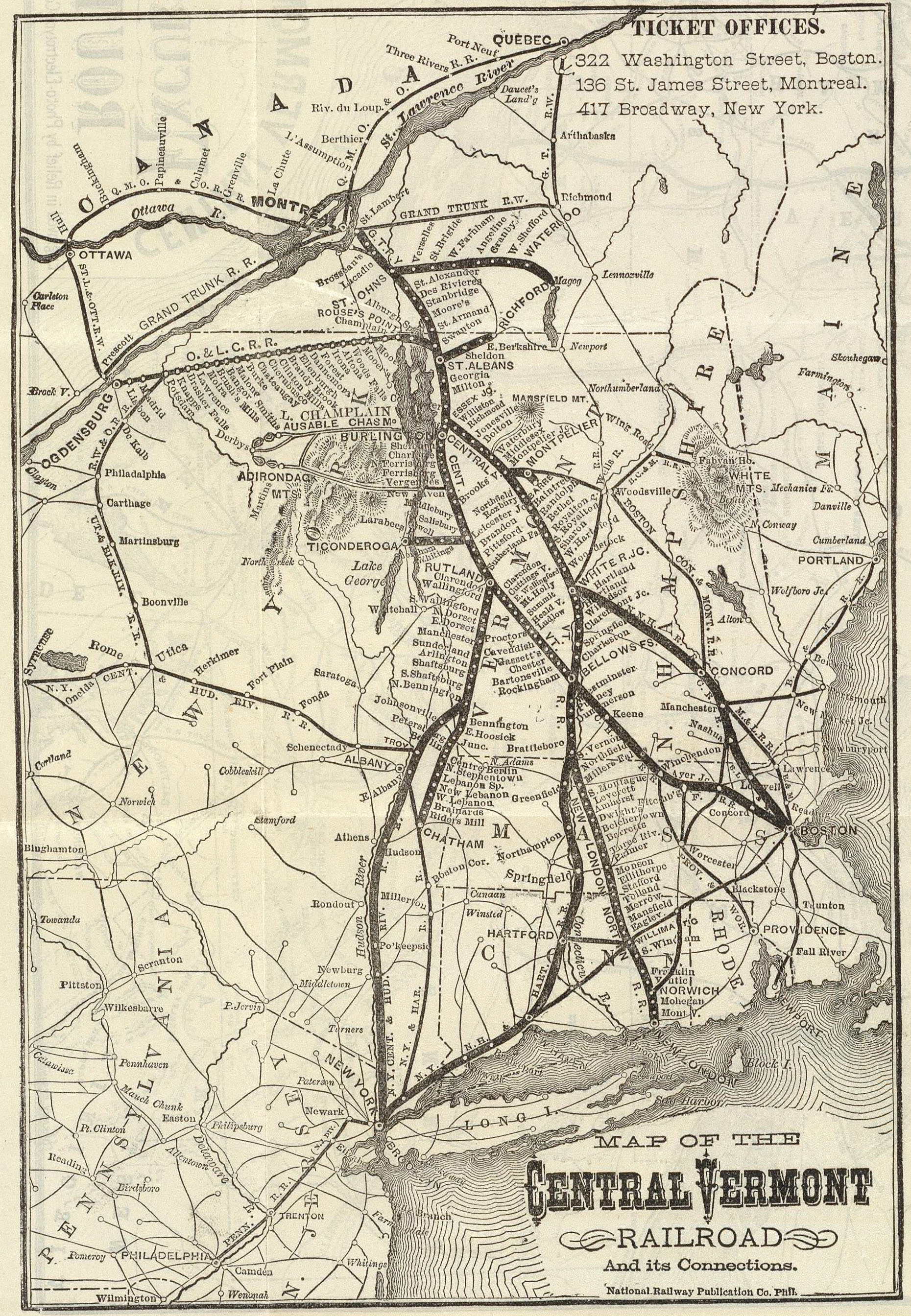
1879 map of the Vermont Central Railway

After many years, some of the colonists were granted land in the frontier of the central Mohawk Valley west of present-day Little Falls in the 100 lots of the Burnetsfield Patent; in the Schoharie Valley, and other areas, such as Palatine Bridge along the Mohawk River west of Schenectady. They were buffer communities between the British settlements and the Iroquois and French (the latter located mostly in Canada.)

Columbia County was formed in 1786 after the American Revolutionary War from portions of Albany County, once a vast area until new communities were developed and jurisdictions were organized. In 1799, the southern boundary of Columbia County was moved southward to include that portion of Livingston Manor located in Dutchess County.

In the nineteenth century, the Vermont Central Railway was constructed to the area. It provided transportation north towards Rutland and Burlington, Vermont, and south towards the major junction town of Chatham, New York, for travel to points west, south and east.

A large number of LGBT artists and writers settled in Columbia County in the late 20th century, including Ellsworth Kelly, who moved to the county in 1970, followed by James Ivory and Ismail Merchant (1975) and the poet John Ashbery (1978).

== Government and politics ==
United States presidential election results for Columbia County, New York
Year	Republican		Democratic		Third party(ies)	
Year	No.	%	No.	%	No.	%
1884	6,424	51.45%	5,854	46.88%	209	1.67%
1888	6,447	50.46%	6,037	47.25%	292	2.29%
1892	5,384	45.60%	5,868	49.70%	555	4.70%
1896	6,654	58.46%	4,373	38.42%	355	3.12%
1900	6,478	55.61%	4,953	42.52%	217	1.86%
1904	5,996	52.38%	5,245	45.82%	206	1.80%
1908	5,726	51.54%	5,097	45.88%	286	2.57%
1912	3,741	38.01%	4,599	46.73%	1,501	15.25%
1916	5,314	51.35%	4,938	47.71%	97	0.94%
1920	9,284	62.63%	5,203	35.10%	336	2.27%
1924	10,774	63.70%	5,466	32.32%	674	3.98%
1928	14,000	67.92%	6,403	31.06%	209	1.01%
1932	11,667	55.74%	9,083	43.39%	181	0.86%
1936	13,034	60.14%	8,375	38.64%	264	1.22%
1940	13,527	61.04%	8,591	38.76%	44	0.20%
1944	13,055	65.02%	6,969	34.71%	54	0.27%
1948	13,758	65.89%	6,527	31.26%	595	2.85%
1952	17,539	74.16%	6,075	25.69%	35	0.15%
1956	19,004	79.17%	4,999	20.83%	0	0.00%
1960	15,893	64.44%	8,747	35.46%	24	0.10%
1964	9,023	38.30%	14,516	61.62%	19	0.08%
1968	13,857	60.03%	7,762	33.62%	1,466	6.35%
1972	17,995	70.27%	7,558	29.51%	57	0.22%
1976	15,871	59.72%	10,514	39.56%	189	0.71%
1980	13,946	53.08%	9,500	36.16%	2,828	10.76%
1984	18,814	67.46%	8,960	32.13%	117	0.42%
1988	15,111	56.12%	11,585	43.03%	228	0.85%
1992	11,568	39.81%	11,368	39.12%	6,120	21.06%
1996	10,324	37.67%	12,910	47.11%	4,169	15.21%
2000	13,153	45.83%	13,489	47.00%	2,056	7.16%
2004	14,457	46.48%	15,929	51.21%	717	2.31%
2008	13,337	42.43%	17,556	55.85%	540	1.72%
2012	12,225	41.97%	16,221	55.69%	683	2.34%
2016	13,756	44.51%	15,284	49.46%	1,862	6.03%
2020	14,464	40.62%	20,386	57.25%	760	2.13%
2024	15,168	42.25%	20,396	56.82%	333	0.93%

Voters in Columbia County since the mid-19th century have mostly elected Republicans to office. But from 1996 to 2007, new voter registrations by Democrats have outpaced those by Republicans by a margin of 4 to 1. Democrats have been able to win the county in every presidential election since 1996, with Joe Biden's 57% of the vote in 2020 being the highest for a Democrat in the county since 1964.

Voter registration as of April 1, 2016
Party	Active voters	Inactive voters	Total voters	Percentage
Democratic	13,037	1,241	14,278	33.05%
Republican	11,774	724	12,498	28.93%
Unaffiliated	10,724	1,007	11,731	27.16%
Other (Note: Included are voters affiliated with the Conservative Party, Green Party, Working Families Party, Independence Party, Women's Equality Party, Reform Party, and other small parties.)	4,225	467	4,692	10.86%
Total	39,760	3,439	43,199	100%

== Geography ==
According to the U.S. Census Bureau, the county has a total area of 648 square miles (1,680 km^{2}), of which 635 square miles (1,640 km^{2}) is land and 14 square miles (36 km^{2}) (2.1%) is water.

Columbia County is in the southeast south-to-central part of New York State, southeast of Albany and immediately west of the Massachusetts border. The western border is the Hudson River.

The landscapes of the county were among the scenes depicting by the Hudson River School, a mid-19th century art movement.

The terrain is gentle, rolling hills, rising sharply into the Taconic and Berkshire Mountains along the state line. To the west lie the Hudson River and the Catskill Mountains.

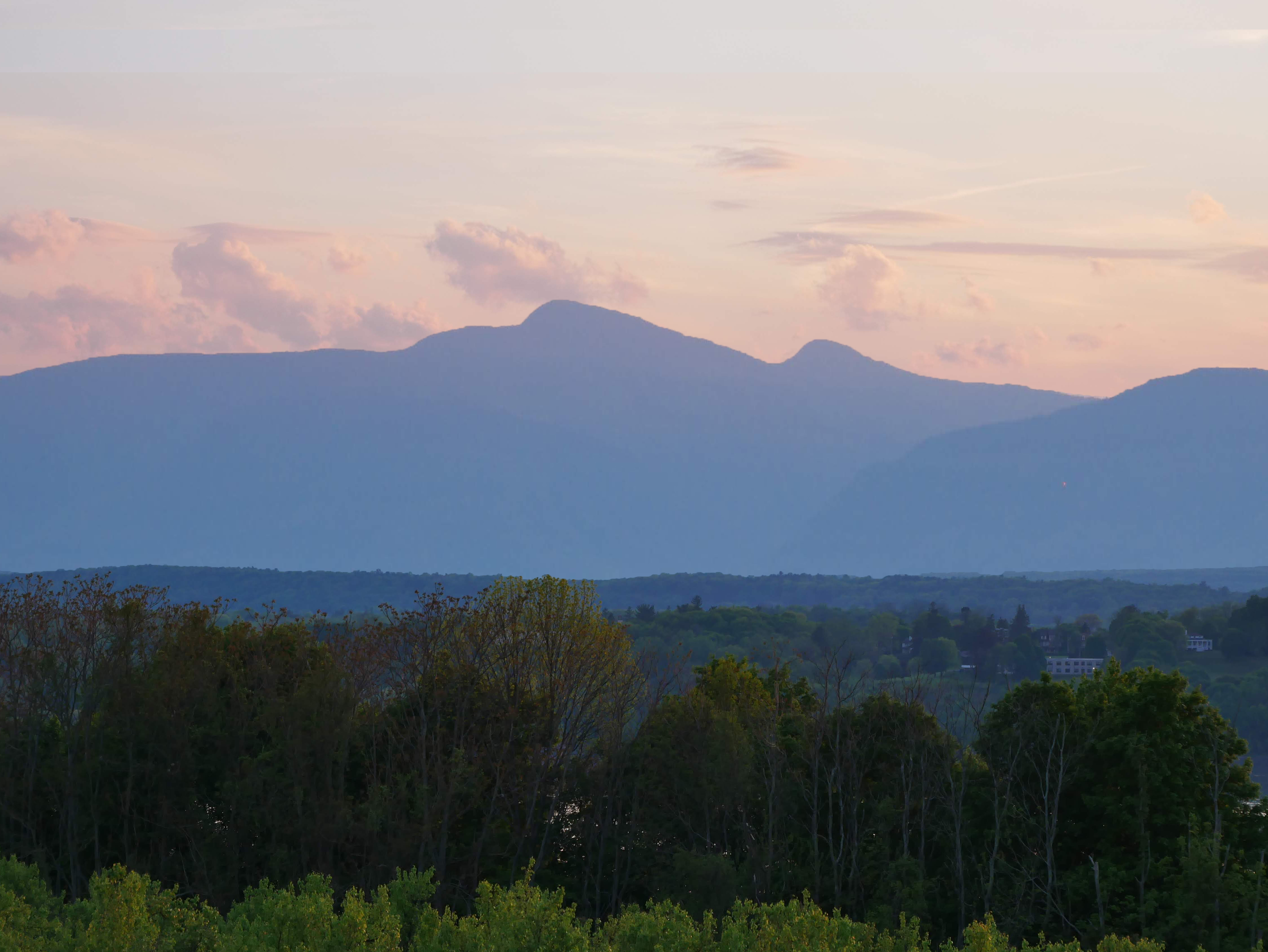
The Catskill Mountains from Olana in southern Columbia County

The highest point is on the Massachusetts state line, near the summit of Alander Mountain, at approximately 2,110 feet (640 m) above sea level, in the town of Copake. The lowest point is at or near sea level, along the Hudson.

Columbia County is accessible by two limited-access highways. The Taconic State Parkway, which is not accessible to trucks or commercial traffic, runs through the center of the county from south to north, ending at an interchange with Interstate 90 and connecting the county with points south. Columbia County is the last New York county located along eastbound Interstate 90 (and the first county along westbound I-90), which passes through the towns of Canaan and Chatham as the Berkshire Connector portion of the New York Thruway. I-90 has two exits within the county; for the southbound Taconic State Parkway in Chatham, and for NYS Route 22 in Canaan. Depending on precise location within the county, road travel distance to New York City ranges between 96 and 145 miles (154 and 233 km).

Several other major routes cross Columbia County including north–south U.S. Route 9, east–west NYS Route 23, north–south NYS Route 22 and a short portion of east–west U.S. Route 20 in the county's northeastern corner.

=== Rivers and streams ===
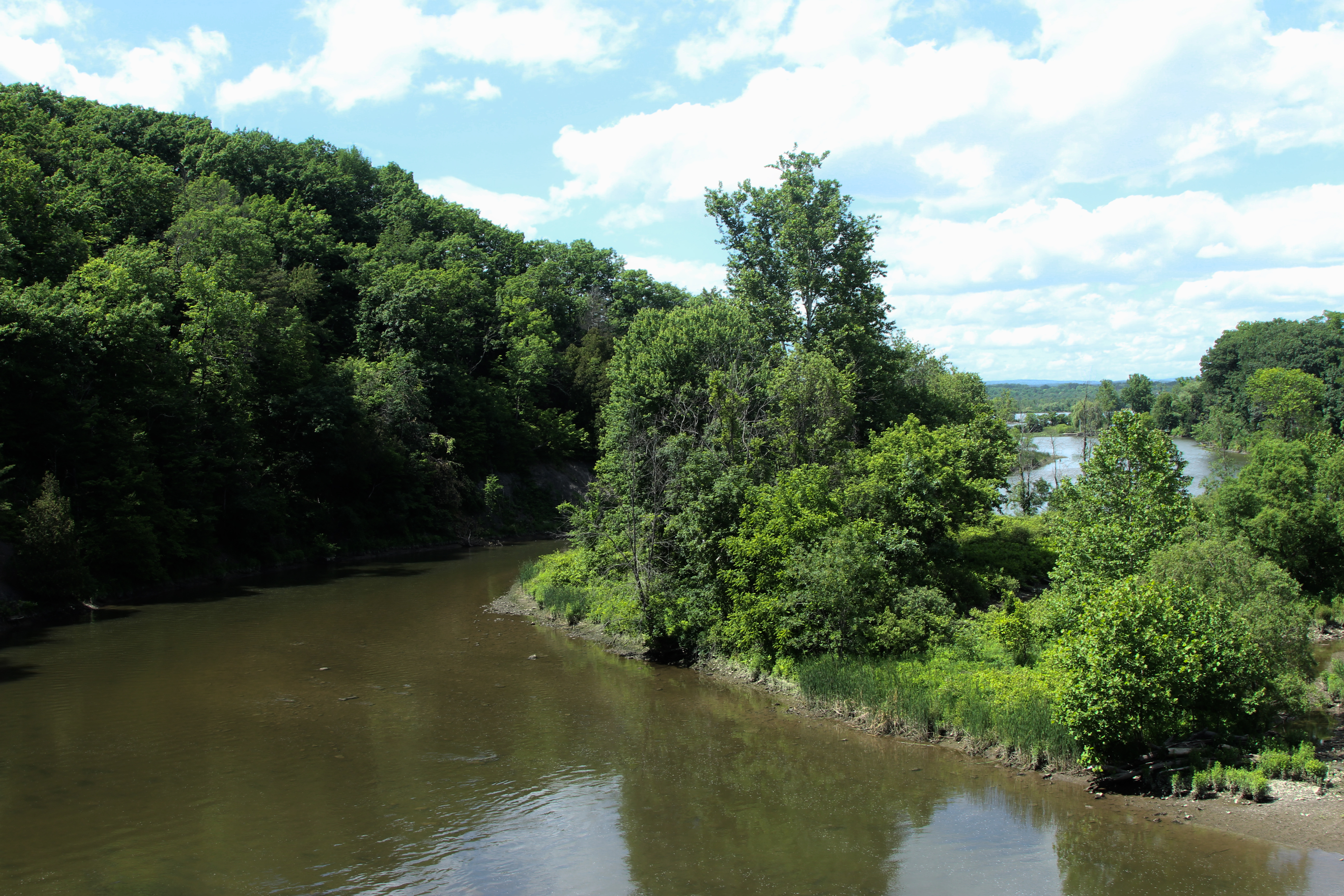
The Roeliff Jansen Kill near Rhinebeck-Hudson Road in Livingston, New York

The Hudson River forms the western border of the county. Other notable creeks include; the Ancram Creek, Claverack Creek, Copake Creek, Kinderhook Creek, Roeliff-Jansen Kill, and Valatie Kill. The Rossman Falls and Stuyvesant Falls lie on the Kinderhook Creek. Notable lakes and ponds include Copake Lake, Kinderhook Reservoir, Queechy Lake, and Lake Taghkanic.

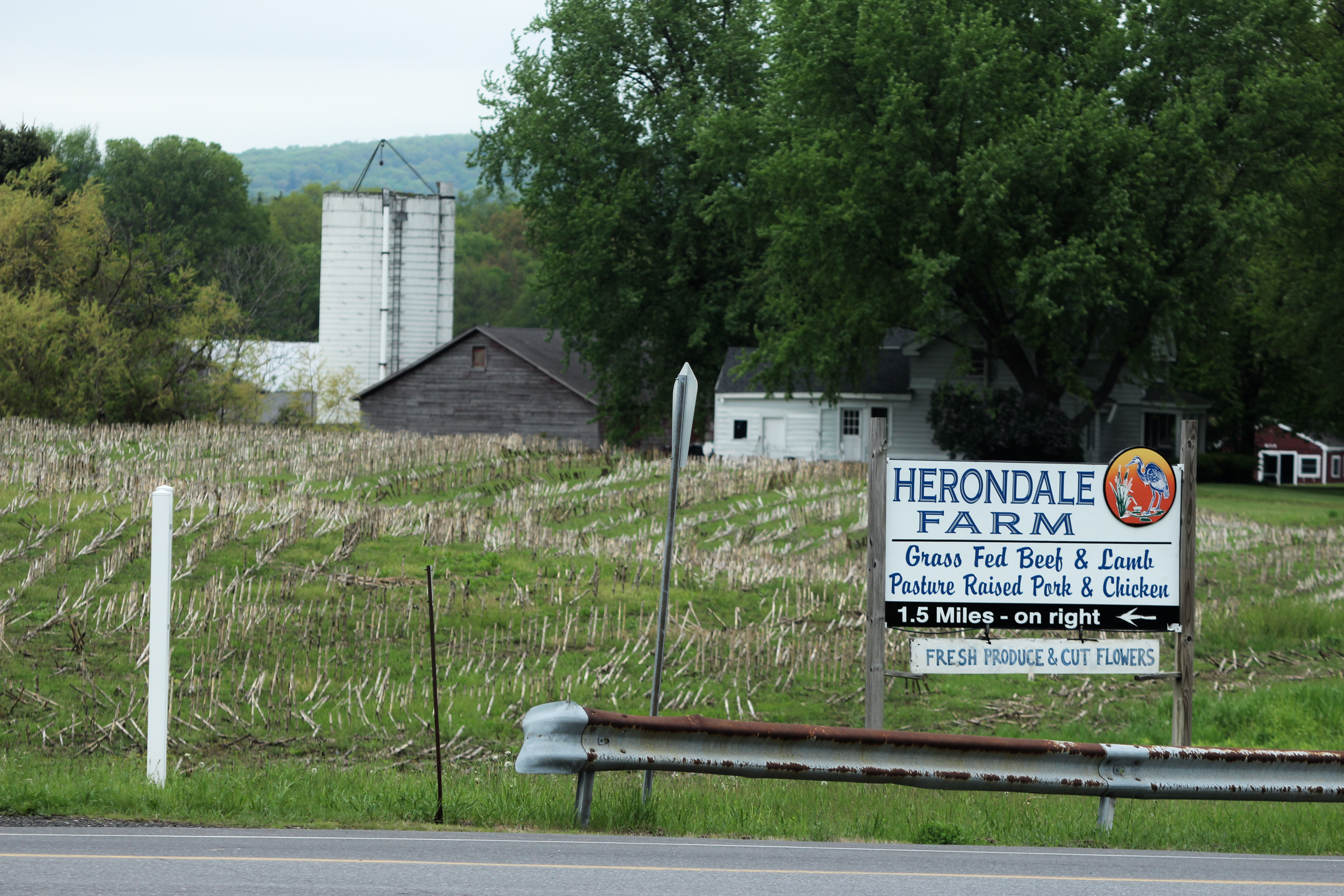
A farm on Columbia County Route 3 in Ancram, New York

=== Farms ===
Columbia County is home to many local farms supplying the area with fresh meat, eggs, herbs, and produce, including Holmquest, Ronnybrook, Fix Brothers Fruit Farm, Eger Brothers, Hover Farms, Marsh Meadow Farm, Schober Farm, Millerhurst, Ooms Farm, Churchtown Dairy, Pigasso, Common Hands Farm, Darlin' Doe, Blue Star Farm, Green Mead Farm, Little Ghent Farm, and Ironwood Farm. Other farms include the large, well-known Hawthorne Valley Farm which includes a farm store and training programs, the biodynamic Roxbury Farm, and FarmOn! at Empire Farm, also a teaching farm.

=== Adjacent counties ===
- Albany County - northwest
- Berkshire County, Massachusetts - east
- Dutchess County - south
- Greene County - west
- Rensselaer County - north
- Ulster County - southwest

=== National protected area ===
- Martin Van Buren National Historic Site

== Demographics ==
Historical population
Census	Pop.	Note	%±
1790	27,496		—
1800	35,322		28.5%
1810	32,390		−8.3%
1820	38,330		18.3%
1830	39,907		4.1%
1840	43,252		8.4%
1850	43,073		−0.4%
1860	47,172		9.5%
1870	47,044		−0.3%
1880	47,928		1.9%
1890	46,172		−3.7%
1900	43,211		−6.4%
1910	43,658		1.0%
1920	38,930		−10.8%
1930	41,617		6.9%
1940	41,464		−0.4%
1950	43,182		4.1%
1960	47,322		9.6%
1970	51,519		8.9%
1980	59,487		15.5%
1990	62,982		5.9%
2000	63,094		0.2%
2010	63,096		0.0%
2020	61,570		−2.4%
2025 (est.)	60,168	▼	−2.3%
U.S. Decennial Census; 1790-1960 1900-1990; 1990-2000 2010-2020

=== 2020 census ===
Columbia County, New York – Racial and ethnic composition Note: the US Census treats Hispanic/Latino as an ethnic category. This table excludes Latinos from the racial categories and assigns them to a separate category. Hispanics/Latinos may be of any race.
Race / Ethnicity (NH = Non-Hispanic)	Pop 1980	Pop 1990	Pop 2000	Pop 2010	Pop 2020	% 1980	% 1990	% 2000	% 2010	% 2020
White alone (NH)	56,637	59,246	57,338	55,672	50,795	95.21%	94.07%	90.88%	88.23%	82.50%
Black or African American alone (NH)	1,992	2,290	2,738	2,691	2,421	3.35%	3.64%	4.34%	4.26%	3.93%
Native American or Alaska Native alone (NH)	88	102	110	85	70	0.15%	0.16%	0.17%	0.13%	0.11%
Asian alone (NH)	138	243	493	998	1,423	0.23%	0.39%	0.78%	1.58%	2.31%
Native Hawaiian or Pacific Islander alone (NH)	x	x	18	15	16	x	x	0.03%	0.02%	0.03%
Other race alone (NH)	94	80	71	97	348	0.16%	0.13%	0.11%	0.15%	0.57%
Mixed race or Multiracial (NH)	x	x	728	1,084	2,955	x	x	1.15%	1.72%	4.80%
Hispanic or Latino (any race)	538	1,021	1,598	2,454	3,542	0.90%	1.62%	2.53%	3.89%	5.75%
Total	59,487	62,982	63,094	63,096	61,570	100.00%	100.00%	100.00%	100.00%	100.00%

=== 2000 census ===
As of the census of 2000, there were 63,094 people, 24,796 households, and 16,588 families residing in the county. The population density was 99 inhabitants per square mile (38/km^{2}). There were 30,207 housing units at an average density of 48 units per square mile (19/km^{2}). The racial makeup of the county was 92.09% White, 4.52% Black or African American, 0.21% Native American, 0.80% Asian, 0.03% Pacific Islander, 0.90% from other races, and 1.45% from two or more races. 2.53% of the population were Hispanic or Latino of any race. 17.2% were of German, 14.7% Italian, 14.5% Irish, 9.0% English, 6.3% Polish and 6.1% American ancestry according to Census 2000. 94.0% spoke English and 2.1% Spanish as their first language.

There were 24,796 households, out of which 29.90% had children under the age of 18 living with them, 52.20% were married couples living together, 10.30% had a female householder with no husband present, and 33.10% were non-families. 27.10% of all households were made up of individuals, and 11.50% had someone living alone who was 65 years of age or older. The average household size was 2.43 and the average family size was 2.95.

In the county, the population was spread out, with 24.10% under the age of 18, 6.40% from 18 to 24, 26.90% from 25 to 44, 26.30% from 45 to 64, and 16.40% who were 65 years of age or older. The median age was 40 years. For every 100 females there were 99.00 males. For every 100 females age 18 and over, there were 95.30 males.

The median income for a household in the county was $41,915, and the median income for a family was $49,357. Males had a median income of $34,702 versus $25,878 for females. The per capita income for the county was $22,265. About 6.40% of families and 9.00% of the population were below the poverty line, including 11.80% of those under age 18 and 6.80% of those age 65 or over.

As of the 2010 census, the racial makeup of the county was 90.6% White, 4.5% African American, 0.2% Native American and 1.6% Asian. Hispanic or Latino people of any race were 3.9% of the population.

== Communities ==
Columbia County municipal map

=== City ===
- Hudson (county seat)

=== Towns ===
- Ancram
- Austerlitz
- Canaan
- Chatham
- Claverack
- Clermont
- Copake
- Gallatin
- Germantown
- Ghent
- Greenport
- Hillsdale
- Kinderhook
- Livingston
- New Lebanon
- Stockport
- Stuyvesant
- Taghkanic

=== Villages ===
- Chatham
- Kinderhook
- Philmont
- Valatie

=== Census-designated places ===
- Claverack-Red Mills
- Copake
- Copake Falls
- Copake Lake
- Germantown
- Ghent
- Lorenz Park
- Niverville
- Stottville
- Taconic Shores

=== Hamlets ===
- Boston Corner
- Chatham Center
- Columbiaville
- Craryville
- East Chatham
- Elizaville
- Humphreysville
- Lebanon Springs
- Malden Bridge
- Mellenville
- New Britain
- New Lebanon
- New Lebanon Center
- Niverville
- North Chatham
- Old Chatham
- Spencertown
- Stuyvesant Falls
- Red Rock
- West Copake
- West Lebanon

== Education ==
- Columbia–Greene Community College is located in Hudson, NY.

School districts which cover sections of the county include:

- Chatham Central School District
- East Greenbush Central School District
- Germantown Central School District
- Hudson City School District
- Kinderhook Central School District (Ichabod Crane)
- New Lebanon Central School District
- Northeast Central School District
- Pine Plains Central School District
- Red Hook Central School District
- Schodack Central School District
- Taconic Hills Central School District

== Transportation ==
=== Major highways ===
Interstate 90 runs east–west through the county. The Taconic State Parkway runs from I-90 south towards Westchester County. The main arterial north–south road, U.S. 9, runs through the larger towns towards the Hudson River.

- I-90 / Berkshire Connector
- US 9
- US 20
- NY 9G
- NY 9H
- NY 9J
- NY 22
- NY 23
- NY 23B
- NY 66
- NY 71
- NY 82
- NY 203
- NY 217
- NY 295
- NY 344
- NY 398
- Taconic State Parkway

=== Railroads ===
Amtrak passenger trains of the Empire Service corridor, as well as the Adirondack, Ethan Allen Express, Maple Leaf and the seasonal Berkshire Flyer make stops at Hudson station.

Into the latter 1930s, the Rutland Railroad (in map above) operated trains between Bennington, Vermont and Chatham. At Chatham Union Station there were connections to New York Central's Harlem Line to Grand Central Terminal. Penn Central (successor to the New York Central) truncated service on the Harlem Line from Chatham to Dover Plains in 1972.

=== Airport ===
Columbia County Airport is located in Hudson and provides general aviation services.

== Notable people ==
- Martin van Buren (1782–1862) – the eighth President of the United States
- Francis Forshew (1827–1895), photographer

== See also ==
- List of counties in New York
- National Register of Historic Places listings in Columbia County, New York
