= List of county routes in Columbia County, New York =

County routes in Columbia County, New York, are signed with the Manual on Uniform Traffic Control Devices-standard yellow-on-blue pentagon route marker. All roads maintained by Columbia County are assigned a county highway number; this number is unsigned. Each county route comprises one or more county highways; however, not all county highways are part of a signed county route.

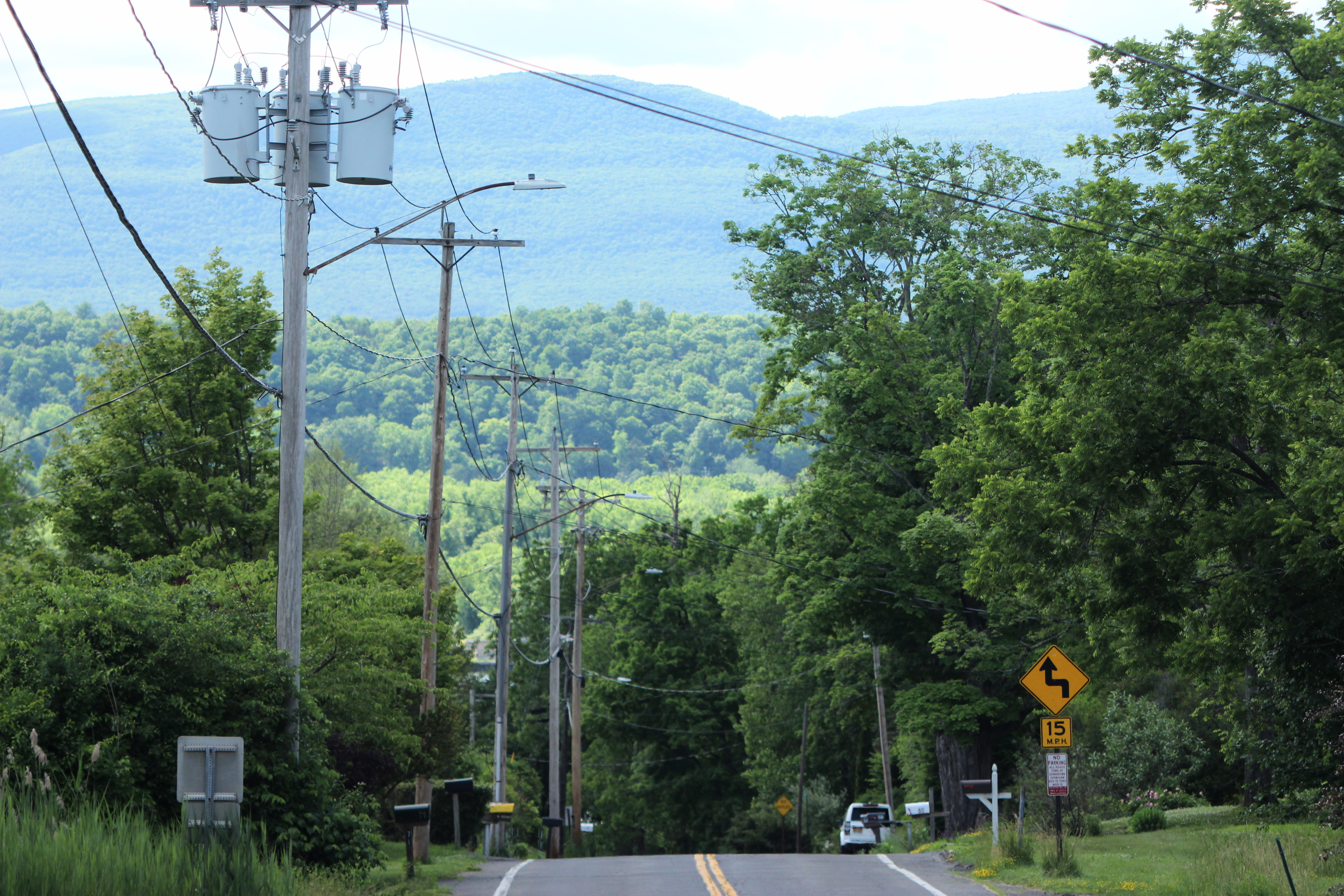
Columbia County Route 8, Germantown, New York

== County routes ==
Route	Length (mi)	Length (km)	From	Via	To	Notes
CR 2	5.74	9.24	Dutchess County line in Clermont (becomes CR 78)	CH 13, CH 2, and CH 41	Dutchess County line in Gallatin (becomes CR 50) (Note: The eastern half of CR 2 frequently crosses the county line, and the sections that lie in Dutchess County are maintained by that county as part of CR 50.)	
CR 3	5.82	9.37	CR 8	CH 17 in Ancram	NY 22	
CR 4	0.88	1.42	Dutchess County line (becomes CR 80)	CH 4 in Clermont	US 9	
CR 5	12.25	19.71	NY 22 in Austerlitz	CH 37, CH 79, and CH 67	US 20 in New Lebanon	
CR 5A	2.98	4.80	US 20	CH 29 in New Lebanon	Rensselaer County line (becomes CR 29)	
CR 6	5.34	8.59	CR 35 in Clermont	CH 40 and CH 15	US 9 in Clermont	
CR 7 (1)	17.14	27.58	Dutchess County line in Gallatin	CH 36, CH 76, CH 55, and CH 16	NY 23 in Copake	
CR 7 (2)	0.02	0.03	CR 7 (segment 1)	CH 55 in Copake	CR 7A (segment 1)	
CR 7 (3)	4.41	7.10	CR 21 in Hillsdale	CH 11	NY 203 in Austerlitz	
CR 7A (1)	5.85	9.41	CR 7 (segment 1)	CH 55 and CH 77 in Copake	CR 7 (segment 1)	
CR 7A (2)	0.31	0.50	CR 7A (segment 1)	CH 55 in Copake	CR 7A (segment 3)	
CR 7A (3)	1.42	2.29	NY 22	CH 55A in Copake	NY 22	
CR 7D	0.93	1.50	NY 22	CH 63 in Hillsdale	Dawson Road	
CR 8 (1)	5.75	9.25	Dead end at Hudson River in Germantown	CH 54	US 9 in Clermont	Part east of NY 9G was designated NY 298 from 1930 to c. 1934
CR 8 (2)	8.28	13.33	US 9 / CR 31 in Livingston	CH 44, CH 49, and CH 81	CR 11 in Gallatin	
CR 8 (3)	2.80	4.51	NY 82	CH 73 and CH 84 in Ancram	Dutchess County line	
CR 8A	2.00	3.22	Dutchess County line (becomes CR 59)	CH 73 in Ancram	NY 82	
CR 9 (1)	5.61	9.03	NY 217 in Claverack	CH 53	NY 66 in Ghent	Former routing of NY 66
CR 9 (2)	15.80	25.43	NY 66 in Ghent	CH 85, CH 27, CH 28, and CH 58	Rensselaer County line in New Lebanon (becomes CR 27)	Discontinuous at NY 295 and US 20
CR 10 (1)	8.57	13.79	NY 9G	CH 48 in Livingston	US 9 / CR 19	
CR 10 (2)	8.57	13.79	NY 82	CH 75 in Taghkanic	CR 27	
CR 11 (1)	4.54	7.31	CR 7	CH 10 in Gallatin	NY 82	
CR 11 (2)	5.42	8.72	CR 27 in Taghkanic	CH 80	NY 23 in Hillsdale	
CR 11 (3)	3.92	6.31	NY 23	CH 6 in Claverack	Philmont village line	
CR 11A	0.81	1.30	CR 11 in Taghkanic	CH 80	NY 23 in Copake	
CR 12	0.53	0.85	Water Street in Livingston	CH 7	CR 27 in Claverack	
CR 13	8.34	13.42	NY 66 in Chatham	CH 33 and CH 78	Rensselaer County line in New Lebanon (becomes CR 19)	
CR 14	1.56	2.51	NY 9G	CH 9 in Greenport	CR 31	
CR 15	3.41	5.49	CR 8 in Gallatin	CH 12	NY 82 in Taghkanic	
CR 16	1.99	3.20	NY 23	CH 24 in Claverack	NY 23	
CR 17	3.08	4.96	NY 66	CH 43 in Chatham	NY 203	
CR 18	3.86	6.21	NY 66	CH 83 in Claverack	NY 217	
CR 19	8.36	13.45	Dutchess County line in Clermont (becomes CR 55)	CH 70, CH 13, and CH 52	US 9 in Livingston	
CR 20	2.60	4.18	US 9 in Stockport	CH 57	NY 9H in Ghent	Formerly NY 401; includes cul-de-sac (CH 21) from NY 9H to Columbia County Airport
CR 21 (1)	5.66	9.11	CR 21C at Harlemville Road	CH 56, CH 47, and CH 47S in Hillsdale	NY 22	Includes both legs of wye connection with NY 22
CR 21 (2)	11.98	19.28	NY 66 in Ghent	CH 26, CH 66, and CH 14	Rensselaer County line in Stuyvesant (becomes CR 1)	Discontinuous at Kinderhook village limits
CR 21B	1.48	2.38	CR 21 in Ghent	CH 26	NY 203 in Kinderhook	
CR 21C	1.55	2.49	NY 217 / Taconic State Parkway in Ghent	CH 86	CR 21 at Harlemville Road in Hillsdale	Formerly part of NY 217
CR 22 (1)	1.81	2.91	Dead end at Hudson River	CH 59 in Stockport	CR 25 in Ghent	Discontinuous at US 9
CR 22 (2)	4.53	7.29	NY 9H	CH 30 in Ghent	CR 21	
CR 24	3.18	5.12	CR 9 in Chatham	CH 37	CR 5 in Canaan	
CR 25	5.88	9.46	Dead end at US 9 in Stockport	CH 22 and CH 71	NY 9H in Kinderhook	
CR 25A	0.56	0.90	CR 25	CH 22 in Stuyvesant	US 9	
CR 25B	0.18	0.29	US 9	CH 22 in Stockport	CR 25	
CR 26A	3.28	5.28	River View Street	CH 87 in Stuyvesant	US 9	Part east of NY 9J was formerly NY 398
CR 27	15.45	24.86	CR 7 in Copake	CH 35 and CH 7	NY 9H / NY 23 in Claverack	
CR 27A	2.09	3.36	CR 7 (segment 1) in Ancram	CH 68	CR 27 in Copake	
CR 27B	1.56	2.51	CR 27	CH 8 in Claverack	CR 16	
CR 28 (1)	2.69	4.33	US 9	CH 2 in Kinderhook	NY 203	
CR 28 (2)	0.55	0.89	CR 28 (segment 1)	CH 25 in Kinderhook	NY 203	
CR 28A	3.21	5.17	Valatie village line in Kinderhook	CH 39	NY 66 in Chatham	
CR 28B	2.43	3.91	CR 28	CH 74 in Kinderhook	CR 32	
CR 29	3.33	5.36	NY 9H / NY 23 in Claverack	CH 19	NY 23B in Greenport	
CR 30	1.45	2.33	NY 295	CH 42 in Canaan	NY 22	
CR 31	7.51	12.09	US 9 / CR 8 in Livingston	CH 51 and CH 9	US 9 / NY 23 in Greenport	
CR 32	5.26	8.47	US 9 at the Rensselaer County line in Kinderhook	CH 38 and CH 60	NY 66 in Chatham	Discontinuous at NY 203
CR 33	6.00	9.66	CR 6 in Clermont	CH 3 and CH 32	NY 9G in Germantown	
CR 34	2.95	4.75	CR 9	CH 72 in New Lebanon	CR 5	
CR 35	4.36	7.02	Dutchess County line in Clermont	CH 5	NY 9G in Germantown	
CR 35A	2.02	3.25	NY 9G	CH 18 in Germantown	NY 9G	
CR 46	2.45	3.94	NY 9J	CH 46 in Stuyvesant	US 9	
CR 61	0.80	1.29	NY 203 in Ghent	CH 61	Chatham village town line in Chatham	
CR 64	0.55	0.89	NY 22 in Hillsdale	CH 64	NY 23 in Copake	
CR 82	1.66	2.67	Taconic State Parkway	CH 82 in Chatham	NY 295	
CR 88	0.38	0.61	NY 66	CH 88 in Ghent	NY 66	
CR 89	0.40	0.64	NY 66 in Claverack	CH 89	NY 9H in Ghent	
CR 90	0.23	0.37	CR 21	Garage Place Road in Ghent	NY 66	

== County highways ==
Every county-maintained road is assigned an unsigned county highway number for inventory purposes. The majority of county highways are part of signed county routes; however, some are not posted with any designation. Those highways or parts of highways that are not part of any county routes are listed below.

Route	Length (mi)	Length (km)	From	Via	To	Notes
CH 22	0.22	0.35	CR 25A	New Street in Stuyvesant	US 9	
CH 65	0.19	0.31	Hudson city line	Columbia Turnpike in Greenport	NY 23B	

== See also ==
- County routes in New York
- List of former state routes in New York (201–300)
