= New York State Route 9H =

State highway in Columbia County, New York, US

New York State Route 9H
- Map of Columbia County in eastern New York with NY 9H highlighted in red

Route information
- Auxiliary route of US 9
- Maintained by NYSDOT
- Length: 18.70 mi (30.09 km)
- Existed: c. 1932–present

Major junctions
- South end: US 9 / NY 23 / NY 82 in Livingston
- US 9 in Valatie
- North end: US 9 in Kinderhook

Location
- Country: United States
- State: New York
- Counties: Columbia

Highway system
- New York Highways; Interstate; US; State; Reference; Parkways
← NY 9G	→ NY 9J

New York State Route 9H (NY 9H) is a state highway located within Columbia County, New York, in the United States. It runs in a north–south direction for 18.70 miles (30.09 km) from an intersection with U.S. Route 9 (US 9), NY 82, and NY 23 in Bell Pond to a junction with US 9 in Valatie. Most of the route is an easterly alternate route of US 9; however, the two routes cross near Valatie, and the northernmost mile of NY 9H runs west of US 9. NY 9H was assigned in the early 1930s to the part of its modern alignment south of Valatie. It was extended to its current length around the end of the 1930s.

== Route description ==
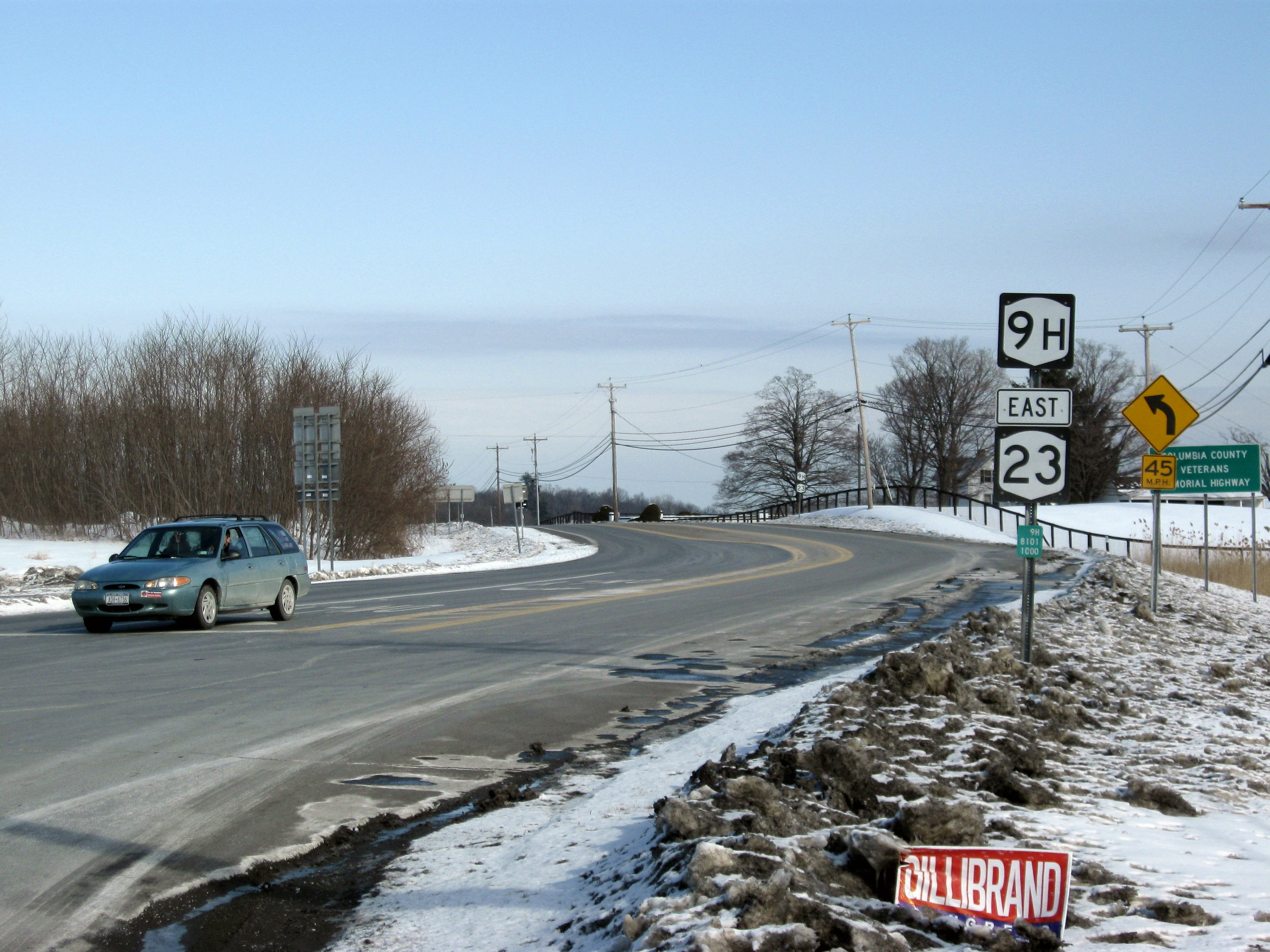
NY 9H and NY 23 proceeding northward in Livingston just after the junction with US 9 and NY 82

NY 9H begins at a junction of three major Hudson Valley roadways, US 9, NY 23, and NY 82, in the Belle Pond section of Livingston. The route heads north through rural Livingston, overlapping with NY 23 as the road passes Belle Pond and farms as a two-lane road. It soon enters the town of Greenport, where NY 9H and NY 23 turn eastward and intersect with the southern terminus of County Route 29 (CR 29, named Spook Rock Road). The two roads enter the town of Claverack, crossing under power lines before bending northward through town. NY 9H and NY 23 remain mainly rural through the southern parts of Claverack, bending northward at a junction with CR 27 before entering the hamlet of Claverack. In Claverack, the two routes become residential before intersecting with the eastern terminus of NY 23B. At this junction, NY 23 turns eastward on NY 23B's continuation, while NY 9H continues north.

NY 9H continues north through Claverack as a two-lane residential street, crossing CR 18 (Fish and Game Road) before turning to the northeast for a short stretch. The route remains rural for a short distance before entering the hamlet of Brick Tavern, where NY 9H intersects with NY 66 (Union Turnpike). NY 9H continues north through Brick Tavern, intersecting with the eastern segment of CR 20 and soon entering the Columbia County Airport area. Continuing north along the airport, NY 9H intersects with the western segment of CR 20, a former alignment and eastern terminus of NY 401. After leaving the airport area, NY 9H is now in the town of Ghent, passing Meadowgreens Golf Course before turning north into the hamlet of West Ghent. In West Ghent, the two-lane rural highway intersects with CR 22 before continuing into the town of Kinderhook.

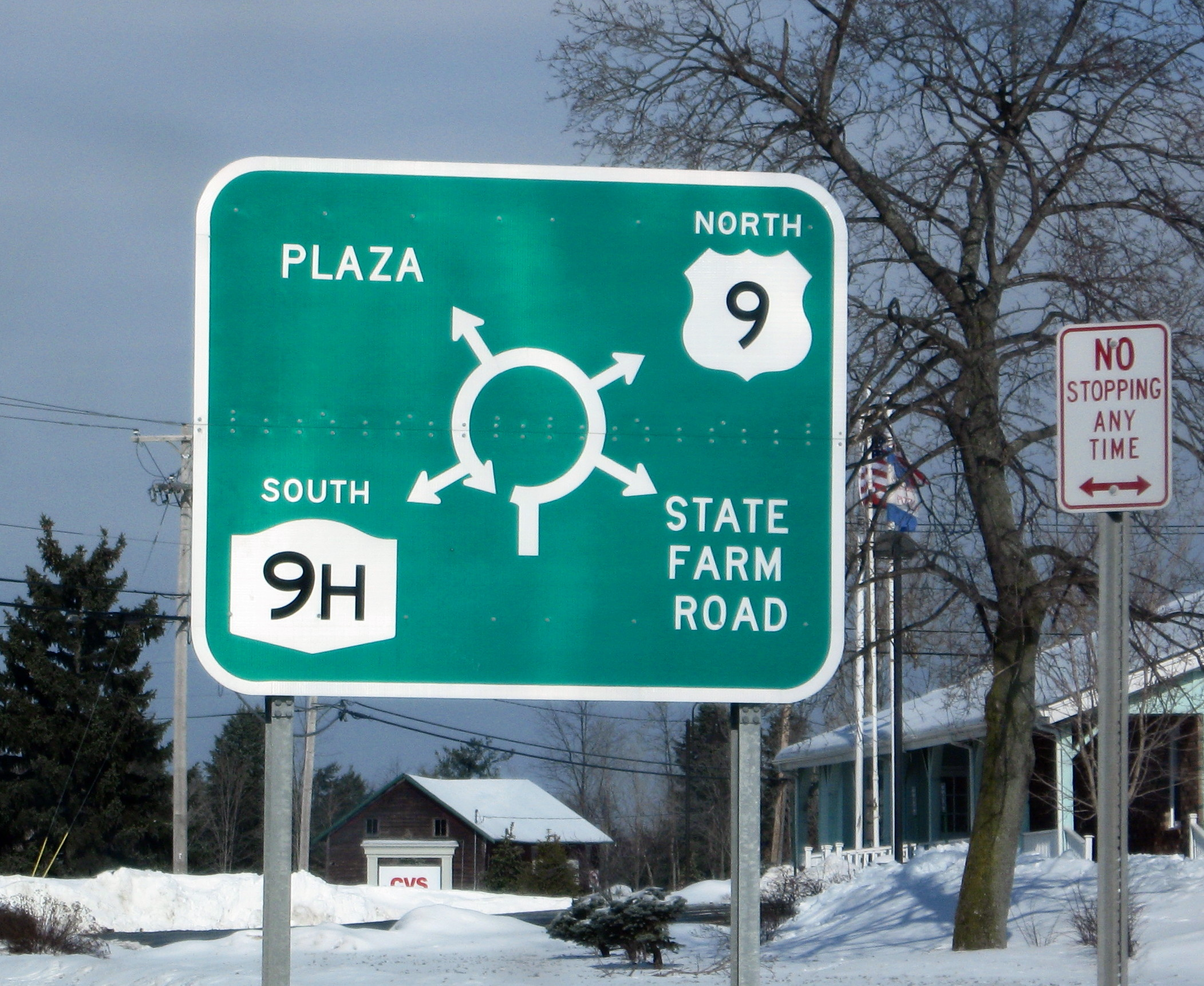
Signage for NY 9H's northern terminus at US 9 in Kinderhook

In Kinderhook, NY 9H intersects with the western terminus of CR 25 before turning northeast near the Martin Van Buren National Historic Site. At Fischer Road, NY 9H turns northward once again, becoming a divided highway near CR 21 (Hudson Street) in Kinderhook. NY 9H bends to the northwest around the hamlet of Kinderhook before crossing US 9 (Kinderhook Street) once again in the town of Valatie. After crossing US 9, NY 9H passes west of Prospect Hill Cemetery and re-entering the town of Kinderhook. The route becomes a commercial strip for a short distance before ending at a roundabout with US 9.

== History ==
NY 9H was assigned c. 1932 to the portion of its modern alignment south of US 9 southwest of Valatie. At the time, large parts of the road were being rebuilt as the highway had just been acquired by the state of New York sometime in the previous two years. By 1933, work had been completed on the part of NY 9H south of Union Turnpike (NY 66). The remainder of the route was an unimproved dirt road until c. 1938. NY 9H was extended north around the western edge of Valatie to its current northern terminus c. 1940. In May 1957, the Ghent School District lobbied the state to reduce the speed limit on NY 9H between NY 66 and CR 20. The district believed that the existing speed limit posed a danger to both children waiting for school buses and to members of the West Ghent Fire Department, located on NY 9H near NY 66. A specific speed limit was not suggested by the district at this time.

== Major intersections ==
The entire route is in Columbia County.

Location	mi	km	Destinations	Notes
Town of Livingston	0.00	0.00	US 9 / NY 23 west / NY 82 south to I-87 / New York Thruway / Taconic State Parkway – Poughkeepsie, Rip Van Winkle Bridge	Southern terminus; southern end of NY 23 concurrency; northern terminus of NY 82
Town of Claverack	3.89	6.26	NY 23 east / NY 23B west to Taconic State Parkway – Hudson, Hillsdale	Northern end of NY 23 concurrency; eastern terminus of NY 23B; hamlet of Claverack
Town of Claverack	7.40	11.91	NY 66 – Hudson, Chatham	
Town of Ghent			CR 20 west – Stottville	Eastern terminus of CR 20; former NY 401
Valatie	17.37	27.95	US 9 – Valatie, Kinderhook	Interchange; no northbound access to US 9 south
Town of Kinderhook	18.70	30.09	US 9 to I-87 / New York Thruway / I-90 / Berkshire Connector – State Farm Road	Roundabout; northern terminus
1.000 mi = 1.609 km; 1.000 km = 0.621 mi: Concurrency terminus
