= New York State Route 401 (1930s–1950s) =

Former state highway in New York State

New York State Route 401
- Map of Columbia County and vicinity with NY 401 highlighted in red

Route information
- Maintained by NYSDH
- Length: 1.95 mi (3.14 km)
- Existed: 1930s–early 1950s

Major junctions
- West end: US 9 in Stockport
- East end: NY 9H in Ghent

Location
- Country: United States
- State: New York
- Counties: Columbia

Highway system
- New York Highways; Interstate; US; State; Reference; Parkways
← NY 400	→ NY 402

New York State Route 401 (NY 401) was an east–west state highway in Columbia County, New York, in the United States. The western terminus of the route was at an intersection with U.S. Route 9 (US 9) in the town of Stockport. Its eastern terminus was at a junction with NY 9H in the town of Ghent. In between, NY 401 passed through the hamlet of Stottville.

NY 401 was assigned in the 1930s and removed in the early 1950s. The section between US 9 to the village of Stottsville was designated as New York State Route 955 (NY 955), a reference route, while the rest was designated as part of County Route 20 (CR 20). On April 1, 1980, the section designated as NY 955 was turned over to the county and became a continuation of CR 20.

== Route description ==
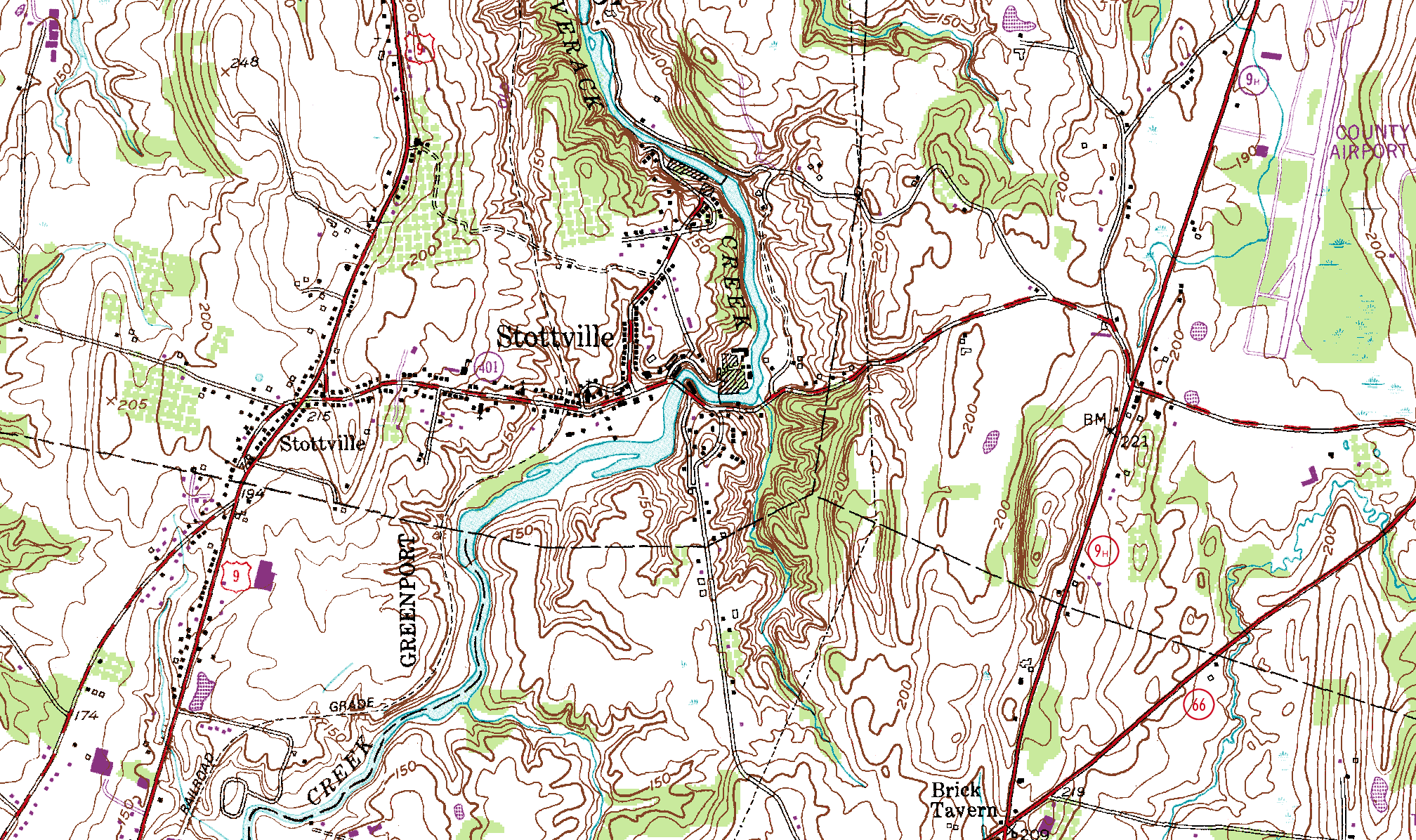
Topographic map of NY 401's former routing

NY 401 began at an intersection with US 9 in the town of Stockport. It headed eastward into Stottville, a small hamlet situated on the western bank of Claverack Creek. Here, NY 401 passed Stockport Town Hall and crossed over Claverack Creek. Not far to the east of the creek, the route entered the town of Ghent. Shortly thereafter, NY 401 ended at an intersection with NY 9H near the Columbia County Airport.

== History ==
NY 401 was assigned at some point during the 1930s. The route remained unchanged until the early 1950s when the NY 401 designation was removed from the highway. Ownership and maintenance of NY 401's former routing east of Stottville was transferred from the state of New York to Columbia County at some point prior to 1977 while the remainder of the alignment, designated as NY 955 was given to the county on April 1, 1980, as part of a highway maintenance swap between the two levels of government. The entirety of NY 401's former routing is now part of CR 20, a designation that also applies to a pair of dead-end streets leading from NY 9H and NY 66 near the Columbia County Airport.

== Major intersections ==
The entire route was in Columbia County.

Location	mi	km	Destinations	Notes
Stockport	0.00	0.00	US 9	Western terminus
Ghent	1.94	3.12	NY 9H	Eastern terminus
1.000 mi = 1.609 km; 1.000 km = 0.621 mi

== See also ==
- List of county routes in Columbia County, New York
