= New York State Route 23B =

State highway in Columbia County, New York, US

New York State Route 23B
- Map of Columbia and Greene counties with NY 23B highlighted in red

Route information
- Auxiliary route of NY 23
- Maintained by NYSDOT and the city of Hudson
- Length: 6.71 mi (10.80 km)
- Existed: late 1950s–present

Major junctions
- West end: NY 9G / NY 23 in Greenport
- US 9 in Hudson
- East end: NY 9H / NY 23 in Claverack-Red Mills

Location
- Country: United States
- State: New York
- Counties: Columbia

Highway system
- New York Highways; Interstate; US; State; Reference; Parkways
← NY 23A	→ NY 24

New York State Route 23B (NY 23B) is an east–west state highway located in western Columbia County, New York, in the United States. The route is a former section of NY 23 that runs for 6.71 miles (10.80 km) from NY 9G southwest of Hudson to NY 9H in Claverack-Red Mills. It provides direct access to the city of Hudson from the Rip Van Winkle Bridge whereas NY 23 bypasses it to the south. NY 23B was assigned in the late 1950s after NY 23 was moved onto its current alignment south of Hudson.

== Route description ==
NY 23B forks from its parent, NY 23, 3 miles (5 km) south of the city of Hudson and a half-mile (0.8 km) east of the Rip Van Winkle Bridge in Greenport, Columbia County. The intersection borders the grounds of the Olana State Historic Site and is 300 yards (270 m) west of the Columbia-Greene Community College campus. NY 9G, concurrent with NY 23 west of this point, leaves NY 23 to follow NY 23B toward Hudson. The route is the westernmost through route along the Hudson River between the Rip Van Winkle Bridge and Hudson; however, it is separated from the river by Mount Merino, a peak situated 546 feet (166 m) above sea level. From NY 23, the two-lane road heads northeast through rural, wooded areas until it reaches the city of Hudson.

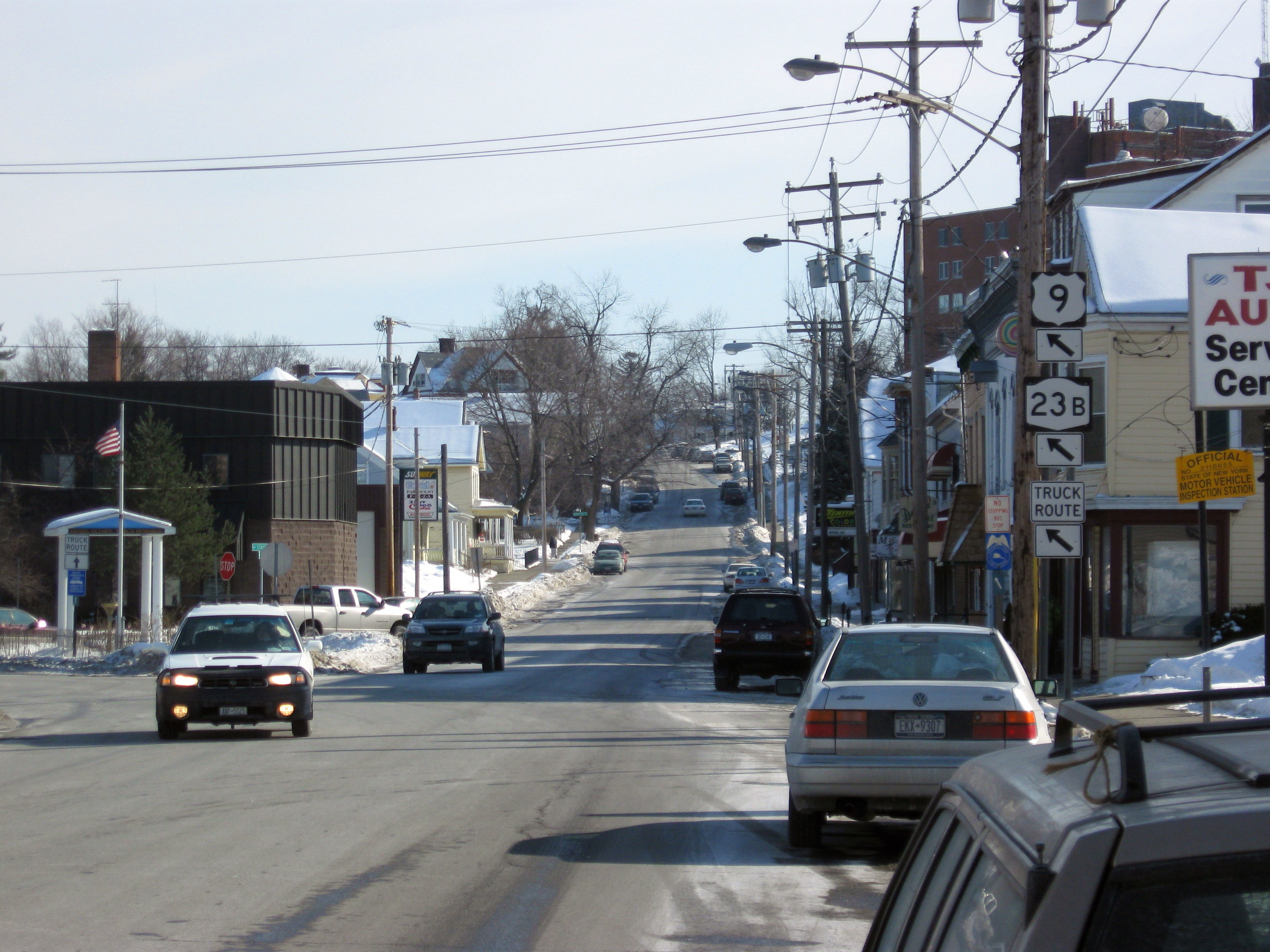
Along with US 9, NY 23B heads eastbound through Hudson.

Upon entering the Hudson city limits, NY 9G and NY 23B change from a state-maintained highway to a locally maintained street as it traverses the marshy South Bay. The routes continue into the commercial downtown district, where they follow Third Street for several blocks to Columbia Street. Here, NY 9G and NY 23B veer east, following Columbia Street through the city to a junction with US 9 at Park Place. NY 9G terminates here; however, NY 23B continues east on Columbia Street, now joined by US 9. Both routes curve onto Green Street one block later. At Fairview Avenue, US 9 splits from NY 23B and heads north while NY 23B heads southeastward as an independent route for the first time. NY 23B passes out of Hudson and back into Greenport after intersecting the southern terminus of NY 66 at Columbia Street.

In Greenport, maintenance of NY 23B reverts to the New York State Department of Transportation (NYSDOT). The route remains in Greenport for only 1 mile (1.6 km), passing residential and industrial neighborhoods on the fringe of the city as it intersects the north end of County Route 29 (Spook Rock Road). Just east of the junction, NY 23B traverses Claverack Creek and crosses into the town of Claverack, where the route initially serves a sparsely developed area between the town line and the hamlet of Claverack-Red Mills. The open fields are gradually replaced by homes as the highway enters Claverack, where NY 23B meets NY 9H and NY 23 at a junction in the center of the community. NY 23B ends here while NY 23 continues east on the route's right-of-way.

== History ==
When the first set of posted routes in New York were assigned in 1924, the portion of NY 23B from Third Street in Hudson to Claverack-Red Mills was designated as part of NY 23. West of Hudson, NY 23 continued across the Hudson River to Athens by way of a ferry. The Rip Van Winkle Bridge over the Hudson River between Catskill and Greenport was opened to traffic on July 2, 1935; however, NY 23 was not realigned to use the structure until the Athens–Hudson ferry was shut down in the late 1940s. NY 23 utilized modern NY 23B between the bridge and Hudson. In the late 1950s, NY 23 was realigned between the east end of the bridge and Claverack to follow a new, more southerly alignment via Bell Pond. Its former routing via Hudson was redesignated as NY 23B.

== Major intersections ==
The entire route is in Columbia County.

Location	mi	km	Destinations	Notes
Greenport	0.00	0.00	NY 9G south / NY 23 to I-87 / New York Thruway / Taconic State Parkway – Rip Van Winkle Bridge	Western terminus; western end of NY 9G concurrency
Hudson	3.45	5.55	US 9 south (Park Place) – Poughkeepsie NY 9G ends	Western end of US 9 concurrency; northern terminus of NY 9G
Hudson	3.96	6.37	US 9 north (East Fairview Avenue) to I-90 / Berkshire Connector – Albany NY 66 begins	Eastern end of US 9 concurrency; southern terminus of NY 66
Hudson	4.06	6.53	NY 66 north (Union Turnpike)	Eastern end of NY 66 concurrency
Claverack	6.71	10.80	NY 9H north / NY 23 to Taconic State Parkway / I-90 / Berkshire Connector – Albany, Poughkeepsie	Eastern terminus; southern terminus of NY 9H; hamlet of Claverack
1.000 mi = 1.609 km; 1.000 km = 0.621 mi: Concurrency terminus
