= New York State Route 82 =

Highway in New York

New York State Route 82
- Map of eastern New York with NY 82 highlighted in red

Route information
- Maintained by NYSDOT
- Length: 59.91 mi (96.42 km)
- Existed: 1930–present

Major junctions
- South end: NY 52 in Brinckerhoff
- NY 376 in Hopewell Junction; Taconic State Parkway in Arthursburg; NY 55 in Billings; NY 343 in Millbrook; US 44 in Millbrook; NY 199 in Pine Plains; Taconic State Parkway in Taghkanic
- North end: US 9 / NY 9H / NY 23 in Livingston

Location
- Country: United States
- State: New York
- Counties: Dutchess, Columbia

Highway system
- New York Highways; Interstate; US; State; Reference; Parkways
← NY 81	→ NY 83

New York State Route 82 (NY 82) is a state highway in the eastern Hudson Valley of New York in the United States. It begins at a junction with NY 52 northeast of the village of Fishkill, bends eastward towards Millbrook, and then returns westward to end at a junction with U.S. Route 9, NY 9H, and NY 23 at Bell Pond, near Claverack. NY 82 meets the Taconic State Parkway twice; it is the only state highway that has more than one exit with the parkway. The road spans two counties: Dutchess and Columbia.

NY 82 was assigned as part of the 1930 renumbering of state highways in New York. An alternate route of NY 82 from South Millbrook to Pine Plains, designated as New York State Route 82A, was assigned at the same time. Part of NY 82A was replaced by the new U.S. Route 44 c. 1935. The routings of NY 82 and NY 82A were swapped in the mid-1930s, but the change was reverted in 1966. Ownership and maintenance of NY 82A was transferred from the state of New York to Dutchess County in 1980, at which time it was redesignated as County Route 83 (CR 83).

== Route description ==
NY 82 begins at an intersection with NY 52 in Brinckerhoff. The route proceeds to the northeast, paralleling the path of the Fishkill Creek through southern Dutchess County. At the East Fishkill hamlet of Hopewell Junction, NY 82 briefly overlaps NY 376 before separating from the waterway east of the hamlet. NY 82 continues north to the community of Arthursburg, where it meets the Taconic State Parkway at an interchange. Past the exit, the two roads begin to follow parallel routings through the center of the county. To the north in Billings, NY 82 intersects NY 55 before continuing onward toward the village of Millbrook. South of Millbrook, NY 82 turns to the west at an intersection with NY 343. Midway between Millbrook and the Taconic Parkway, NY 82 meets U.S. Route 44 and overlaps the route for a short distance to the west. The two routes separate just east of where US 44 meets the parkway.

North of the split with US 44, NY 82 passes through the former hamlet of Bloomvale. It then leaves the vicinity of the parkway and begins to parallel Wappinger Creek as it heads through the northern extent of Dutchess County. At Pine Plains, the creek terminates while NY 82 intersects NY 199 in the center of the hamlet. NY 82 turns east, forming a brief overlap with NY 199 before splitting outside of the community. Shortly after leaving NY 199, NY 82 passes into Columbia County.

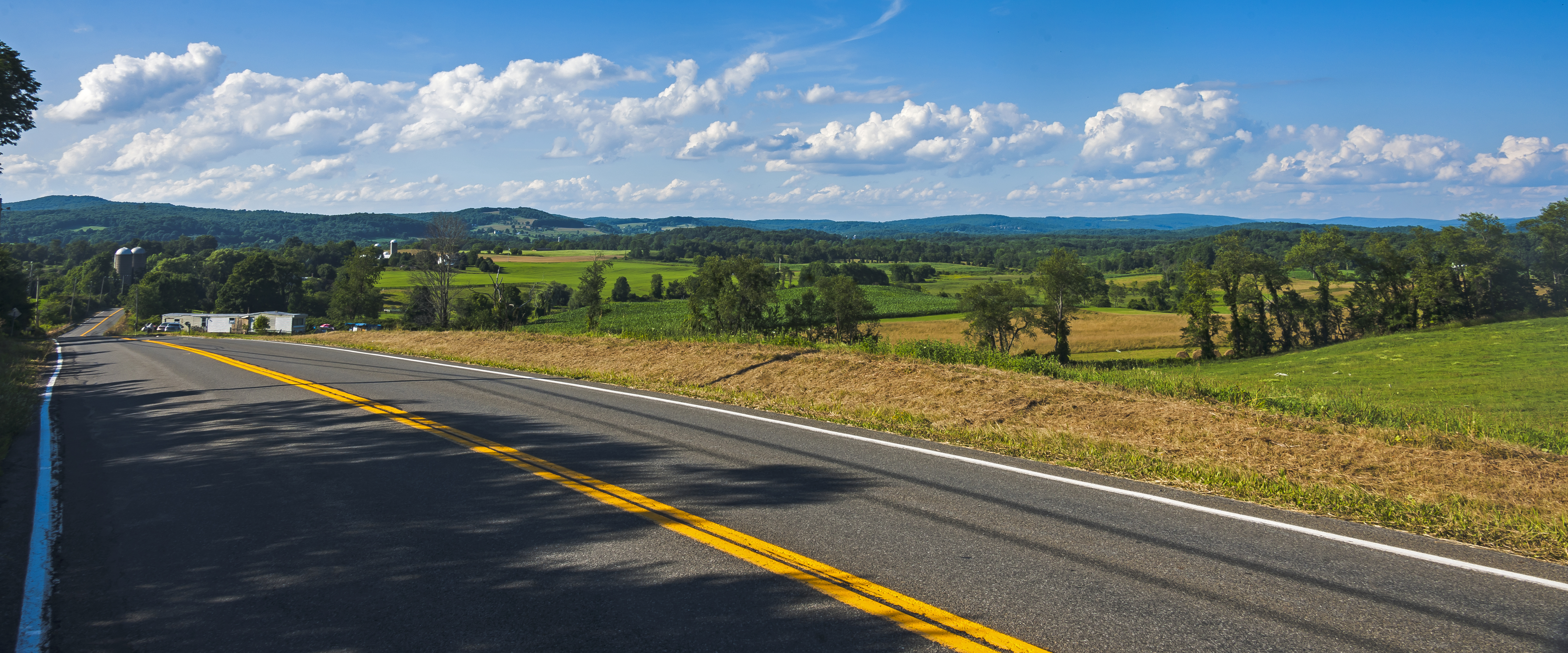
View from Route 82 in Ancram

Within Columbia County, NY 82 maintains a predominantly northwest–southeast routing. From the county line northward, NY 82 passes through Ancramdale and Ancram prior to meeting the Taconic Parkway a second time near the Lake Taghkanic State Park in West Taghkanic. Past the Taconic, NY 82 continues onward to Bell Pond, where it terminates at an intersection with U.S. Route 9, NY 9H, and NY 23.

== History ==
=== Origins and establishment ===
In 1908, the New York State Legislature created Route 1, an unsigned legislative route extending from New York City to Rensselaer. Route 1 left modern NY 22 at the hamlet of Amenia and followed what is now U.S. Route 44 west to Smithfield Valley Road. From there, the route headed north through the town of North East and northwest through the town of Pine Plains to the community of Pine Plains by way of Smithfield Valley Road. Route 1 continued northward on Silvernails and Gallatinville Roads and modern CR 7 to the hamlet of Ancram, where it turned northeast to follow today's CR 7 toward Copake. On March 1, 1921, Route 1 was realigned between Amenia and Copake to use modern NY 22 instead.

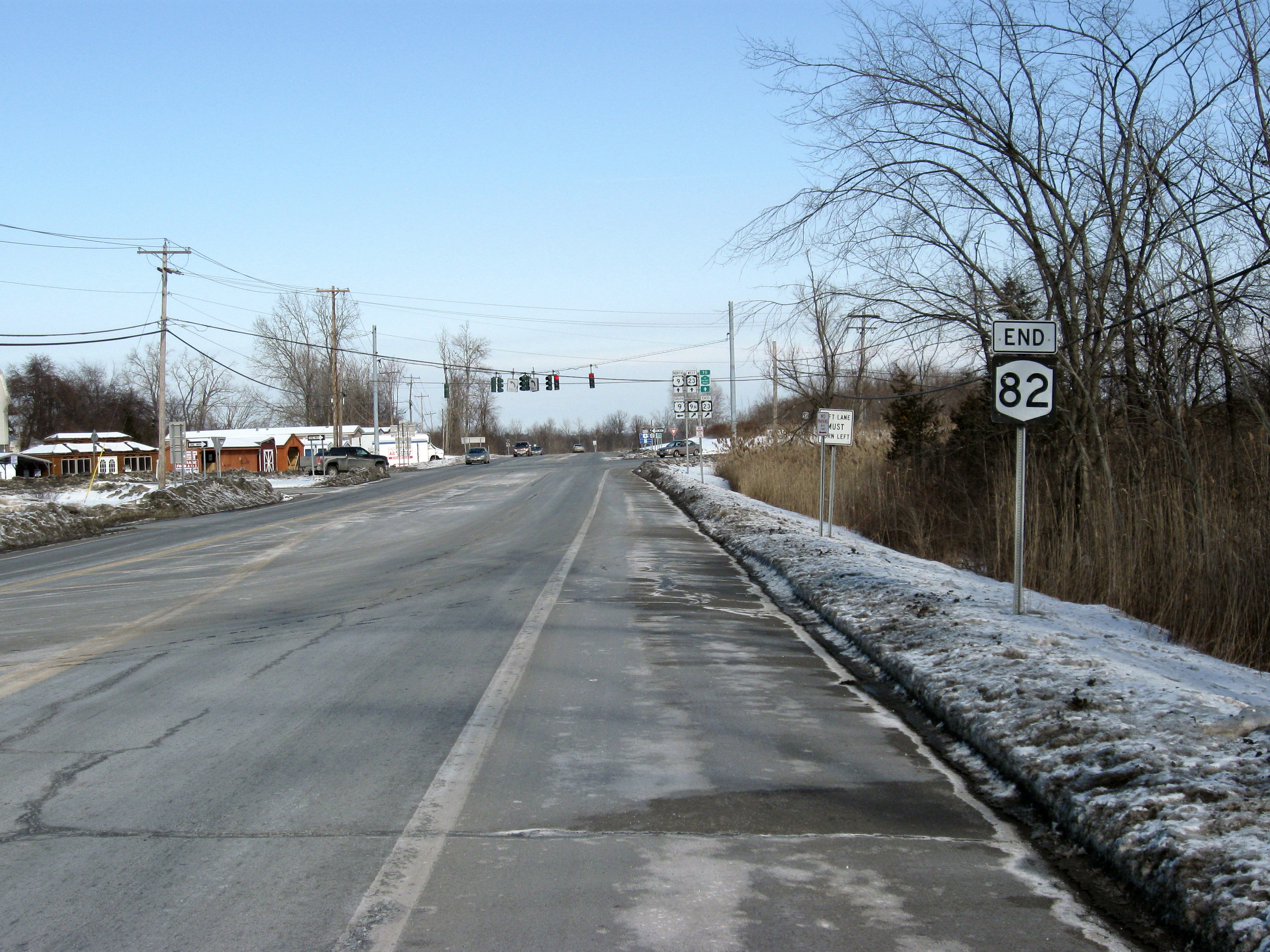
NY 82's northern terminus at US 9, NY 23 and NY 9H in Bell Pond.

In the 1930 renumbering of state highways in New York, the portion of pre-1921 legislative Route 1 between Pine Plains and Ancram became part of NY 82, a new route extending from the vicinity of the village of Fishkill in the south to the town of Livingston in the north. At the same time, the segment of old Route 1 from Amenia to Pine Plains became part of NY 82A, an alternate route of NY 82 between the hamlets of South Millbrook and Pine Plains by way of Amenia.

=== Realignments and maintenance transfers ===
The portions of NY 82 and NY 82A between Washington's Hollow and Amenia were incorporated into the new US 44 c. 1935. As a result, NY 82A was truncated to begin at US 44 near Amenia while NY 82 overlapped US 44 from South Millbrook to Washington's Hollow. The routings of NY 82 and NY 82A between South Millbrook and Pine Plains were swapped c. 1936, with the route via Amenia becoming NY 82 and the route via Stanford becoming NY 82A. From South Millbrook to Amenia, NY 82 overlapped US 44.

NY 82 has been realigned twice between Pine Plains and Ancram since its assignment. The first realignment was made c. 1935 when the route was altered to bypass Gallatinville Road and continue on Silvernails Road to modern CR 7 in the hamlet of Silvernails. In the early 1950s, NY 82 was changed to exit Pine Plains to the east by way of an overlap with NY 199. At Hammertown, the two routes split and NY 82 continued north to Ancram by way of Ancramdale. Between Ancramdale and Ancram, NY 82 replaced New York State Route 201, a route from originally assigned as part of the 1930 renumbering. The sections of NY 201 from Ancram north to NY 22 at Copake and from Ancramdale south to NY 199 east of Pine Plains were given to the counties.

In 1966, NY 82 and NY 82A were restored to their c. 1935 alignments, with NY 82 routed through Washington's Hollow and NY 82A beginning in Amenia. On April 1, 1980, ownership and maintenance of NY 82A was transferred from the state of New York to Dutchess County as part of a highway maintenance swap between the two levels of government. Also transferred from the state to the county was the portion of NY 82's original routing in Pine Plains between NY 199 and Silvernails Road. Following the swap, NY 82A was redesignated as CR 83 while NY 82's former routing in Pine Plains became CR 83A.

As part of the above highway maintenance swap, the state assumed maintenance of the portion of NY 82 from NY 199 to the Columbia County line. At the same time, the state also acquired ownership of the segment of NY 82 in Columbia County between the Dutchess County line and CR 7 in Ancram as part of a separate swap with Columbia County. Both segments had previously been county-maintained.

NY 82 originally entered the hamlet of South Millbrook instead of bypassing it to the west. Its former routing into the community is now CR 111 and known as "Old Route 82".

== Major intersections ==
County	Location	mi	km	Destinations	Notes
Dutchess	Town of Fishkill	0.00	0.00	NY 52 – Fishkill, Carmel	Southern terminus; hamlet of Brinckerhoff
Dutchess	Town of East Fishkill	4.24	6.82	NY 376 south	Southern terminus of concurrency with NY 376; hamlet of Hopewell Junction
Dutchess	Town of East Fishkill	4.30	6.92	NY 376 north	Northern terminus of concurrency with NY 376; hamlet of Hopewell Junction
Dutchess	Town of East Fishkill	7.83	12.60	Taconic State Parkway	Exits 43A-B on Taconic State Parkway
Dutchess	LaGrange	11.35	18.27	NY 55 – Pawling, Poughkeepsie	Hamlet of Billings
Dutchess	Millbrook	20.24	32.57	NY 343 east to US 44 – Dover Plains, Millbrook	Western terminus of NY 343; access to US 44 via NY 984P
Dutchess	Town of Washington	22.13	35.61	US 44 east	Southern terminus of concurrency with US 44
Dutchess	Town of Pleasant Valley	23.17	37.29	US 44 west	Northern terminus of concurrency with US 44; hamlet of Washington Hollow
Dutchess	Town of Pine Plains	38.91	62.62	NY 199 west / CR 83A north – Red Hook	Western terminus of concurrency with NY 199; hamlet of Pine Plains
Dutchess	Town of Pine Plains	40.34	64.92	NY 199 east – Millerton	Eastern terminus of concurrency with NY 199
Columbia	Taghkanic	55.07	88.63	Taconic State Parkway	Exit 80 on Taconic State Parkway; hamlet of West Taghkanic
Columbia	Livingston	59.91	96.42	US 9 / NY 9H north / NY 23 – Hudson, Albany, Rip Van Winkle Bridge	Northern terminus; southern terminus of NY 9H
1.000 mi = 1.609 km; 1.000 km = 0.621 mi: Concurrency terminus
