= Lorenz Park, New York =

- Census-designated place
- Location within New York Location within the United States
- Coordinates: 42°15′49″N 73°45′57″W
- Country: United States
- State: New York
- County: Columbia
- Town: Greenport

Area
  - Total: 1.95 sq mi (5.04 km^{2})
  - Land: 1.78 sq mi (4.62 km^{2})
  - Water: 0.16 sq mi (0.42 km^{2})
- Elevation: 180 ft (55 m)

Population (2020)
  - Total: 2,001
  - Density: 1,121.2/sq mi (432.89/km^{2})
- Time zone: UTC-5 (Eastern (EST))
  - Summer (DST): UTC-4 (EDT)
- ZIP Code: 12534 (Hudson)
- FIPS code: 36-43511
- GNIS feature ID: 1867408

Lorenz Park is a census-designated place (CDP) in Columbia County, New York, United States. The population was 2,001 in 2020, a slight decrease from the 2,053 at the 2010 census.

== Geography ==
Lorenz Park is located in the north part of the town of Greenport at 42°15′49″N 73°45′57″W (42.263667, -73.765705). It is bordered to the south by the city of Hudson (the county seat) and to the north by Stottville. It is bordered on the west by the Hudson River and on the east by Claverack Creek, a tributary. U.S. Route 9 passes through the community, leading south into Hudson and north to Stockport and Kinderhook.

According to the United States Census Bureau, the Lorenz Park CDP has a total area of 1.9 square miles (5.0 km^{2}), of which 1.8 square miles (4.6 km^{2}) is land and 0.15 square miles (0.4 km^{2}), or 8.37%, is water.

== Demographics ==
Historical population
Census	Pop.	Note	%±
2000	1,981		—
2010	2,053		3.6%
2020	2,001		−2.5%
U.S. Decennial Census

=== 2020 census ===
As of the 2020 census, Lorenz Park had a population of 2,001. The median age was 45.7 years. 18.6% of residents were under the age of 18 and 23.8% of residents were 65 years of age or older. For every 100 females there were 93.0 males, and for every 100 females age 18 and over there were 86.5 males age 18 and over.

96.9% of residents lived in urban areas, while 3.1% lived in rural areas.

There were 862 households in Lorenz Park, of which 20.1% had children under the age of 18 living in them. Of all households, 35.2% were married-couple households, 18.0% were households with a male householder and no spouse or partner present, and 37.8% were households with a female householder and no spouse or partner present. About 38.3% of all households were made up of individuals and 20.5% had someone living alone who was 65 years of age or older.

There were 959 housing units, of which 10.1% were vacant. The homeowner vacancy rate was 1.2% and the rental vacancy rate was 6.3%.

Racial composition as of the 2020 census
Race	Number	Percent
White	1,333	66.6%
Black or African American	256	12.8%
American Indian and Alaska Native	6	0.3%
Asian	156	7.8%
Native Hawaiian and Other Pacific Islander	0	0.0%
Some other race	71	3.5%
Two or more races	179	8.9%
Hispanic or Latino (of any race)	159	7.9%

=== 2000 census ===
As of the census of 2000, there were 1,981 people, 868 households, and 543 families residing in the CDP. The population density was 1,074.3 inhabitants per square mile (414.8/km^{2}). There were 903 housing units at an average density of 489.7 per square mile (189.1/km^{2}). The racial makeup of the CDP was 91.52% White, 4.69% African American, 0.20% Native American, 0.76% Asian, 1.06% from other races, and 1.77% from two or more races. Hispanic or Latino of any race were 4.14% of the population.

There were 868 households, out of which 27.8% had children under the age of 18 living with them, 45.6% were married couples living together, 13.2% had a female householder with no husband present, and 37.4% were non-families. 32.4% of all households were made up of individuals, and 20.9% had someone living alone who was 65 years of age or older. The average household size was 2.27 and the average family size was 2.88.

In the CDP, the population exhibited a varied age distribution, with 22.7% under the age of 18, 5.5% aged 18 to 24, 26.5% aged 25 to 44, 22.8% aged 45 to 64, and 22.5% who were 65 years of age or older. The median age was 41 years. For every 100 females, there were 86.4 males, and for every 100 females age 18 and over, there were 77.4 males.

The median income for a household in the CDP was $33,958, and the median income for a family was $46,371. Males had a median income of $34,667 versus $25,000 for females. The per capita income for the CDP was $16,859. About 5.2% of families and 9.1% of the population were below the poverty line, including 11.9% of those under age 18 and 4.0% of those age 65 or over.
