= Ancramdale, New York =

- Hamlet
- Location within New York Location within the United States
- Coordinates: 42°01′05″N 73°35′28″W
- Country: United States
- State: New York
- County: Columbia
- Elevation: 548 ft (167 m)
- Time zone: UTC-5 (Eastern (EST))
  - Summer (DST): UTC-4 (EDT)
- ZIP code: 12503
- Area codes: 518 & 838
- GNIS feature ID: 942456

Ancramdale is a hamlet in Columbia County, New York, United States. The community is located along New York State Route 82 in the southeast corner of the county, 19 miles (31 km) southeast of Hudson. Ancramdale has a post office with ZIP code 12503.
