= New York State Route 402 =

Former highway in New York

New York State Route 402
- Map of northwestern Dutchess County with NY 402 highlighted in red

Route information
- Maintained by NYSDOT
- Length: 1.40 mi (2.25 km)
- Existed: early 1930s–April 1, 1980

Major junctions
- West end: Ferry landing in Tivoli
- East end: NY 9G in Tivoli

Location
- Country: United States
- State: New York
- Counties: Dutchess

Highway system
- New York Highways; Interstate; US; State; Reference; Parkways
| ← NY 401 | → NY 403 |

New York State Route 402 (NY 402) was a state highway located within the village of Tivoli in Dutchess County, New York, in the United States. It was assigned in the early 1930s and served as a connector between NY 9G and what was once a ferry landing on the Hudson River west of the village. Although the ferry service linking Tivoli and the village of Saugerties was shut down in the 1940s, NY 402 continued to exist until 1980. On April 1 of that year, ownership and maintenance of the highway was transferred to Dutchess County as part of a highway maintenance swap between the county and the state of New York. The highway became part of an extended County Route 78 (CR 78), which had begun at the junction of NY 9G and NY 402 prior to the swap.

== Route description ==
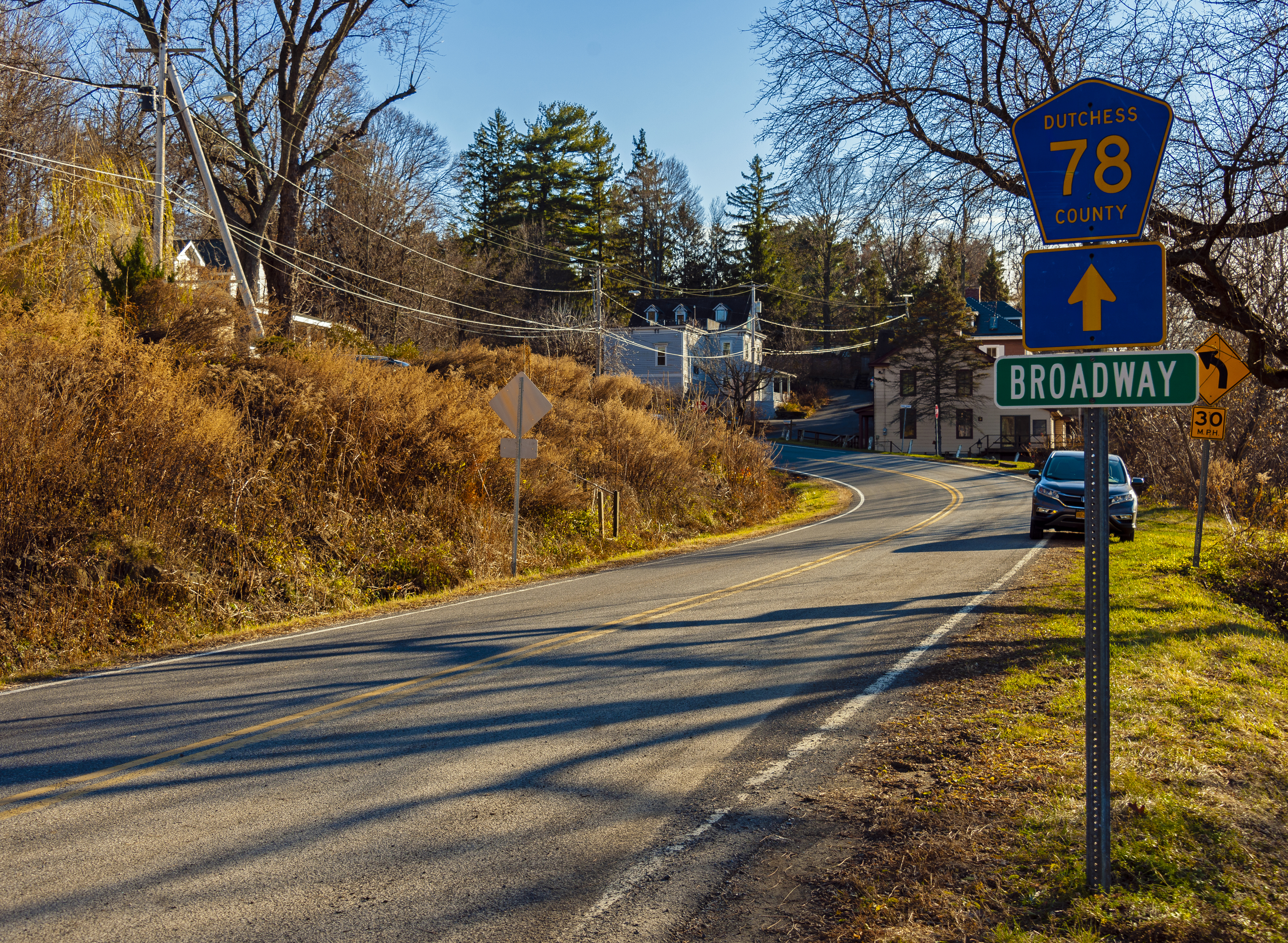
Signage for CR 78 east of the ferry landing

NY 402 began at what was once a ferry landing on the Hudson River west of the Tivoli village center, but within the village limits, in northwestern Dutchess County. The highway went southward from the ferry landing, paralleling the Hudson River for a short distance before it turned eastward and traversed a pair of hills as it approached the center of the village. In this area, NY 402 connected to Sycamore Point, a plateau overlooking the Hudson River. East of the highway leading to Sycamore Point, NY 402 intersected with Woods Road, a north–south highway marking the western edge of the village's central district.

The route proceeded eastward through the village center, an area comprising homes, businesses, and St. Sylvia's Church. It exited the area upon intersecting Clay Hill Road, at which point NY 402 changed names from Broadway to Mill Street. The route continued for another 0.3 miles (0.48 km) to an intersection with NY 9G, where NY 402 ended and the roadway continued east as CR 78.

== History ==
NY 402 was assigned in the early 1930s as a connector between NY 9G east of the village of Tivoli and a ferry landing on the Hudson River west of the village. At the landing, NY 402 connected to a ferry linking Tivoli to U.S. Route 9W (US 9W) in the village of Saugerties. The ferry service was shut down in the 1940s; however, NY 402 remained in place until 1980. On April 1 of that year, ownership and maintenance of NY 402 was transferred from the state of New York to Dutchess County as part of a highway maintenance swap between the two levels of government. Following the swap, the former routing of NY 402 became a westward extension of CR 78, which began at the junction of NY 9G and NY 402 prior to the swap.

When NY 402 was assigned, it was one of two routes that served solely as a connector between a through highway and a ferry landing. The other route was NY 373, a highway linking US 9 to a ferry across Lake Champlain at Port Kent. NY 347, a short route connecting NY 22 to another ferry across Lake Champlain at Ticonderoga, was assigned later in the decade.

== Major intersections ==
The entire route was in Tivoli, Dutchess County.

| mi | km | Destinations | Notes |
|---|---|---|---|
| 0.00 | 0.00 | Ferry landing at Hudson River | Western terminus |
| 1.40 | 2.25 | NY 9G | Eastern terminus |
1.000 mi = 1.609 km; 1.000 km = 0.621 mi
