= Turtle House =

Historic house in New York, United States

- U.S. National Register of Historic Places
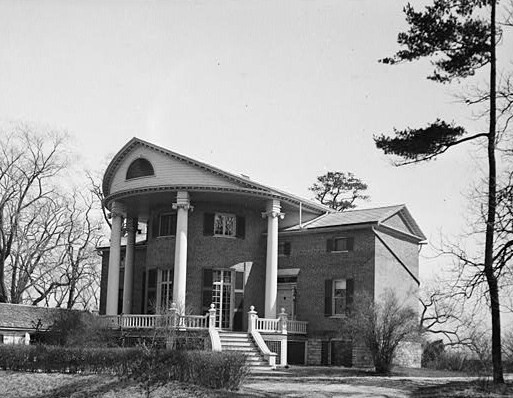
- Old Turtle House, April 1934

- Location within New York Location within the United States
- Location: 14 Fabiano Blvd., Greenport, New York
- Coordinates: 42°15′38″N 73°46′4″W
- Area: less than one acre
- Built: 1820
- Architectural style: Federal
- NRHP reference No.: 01000309
- Added to NRHP: April 2, 2001

Turtle House, also known as Old Turtle House or Joab Center House, is a historic home located at Greenport in Columbia County, New York. It was built about 1820 and is an outstanding and unusual example of Federal period architecture. It has a distinctive lozenge-shaped main block with highly unusual double semi-circular porticos and symmetrical secondary wings.

It was added to the National Register of Historic Places in 2001.
