= Van Salsbergen House =

Historic house in New York, United States

- U.S. National Register of Historic Places
- Location within New York Location within the United States
- Location: 333 Joslen Blvd., near Hudson, New York
- Coordinates: 42°16′10″N 73°46′05″W
- Area: 25 acres (10 ha)
- Built: c. 1700, c. 1800, c. 1860
- Architectural style: Dutch Colonial, Federal
- NRHP reference No.: 10000915
- Added to NRHP: November 10, 2010

Van Salsbergen House, also known as the Black House and Van Hoesen Stone House, is a historic home located in Greenport near the city of Hudson in Columbia County, New York. It was built about 1700, and is a 1 1/2-story stone dwelling with a steeply pitched gable roof. Originally two-rooms large, it was expanded about 1860 with the addition of the north room. As its name implies, the house derives from the original owner and builder, Jan Hendricksen Van Salsbergen, an early settler of the area. He was known to have been born in the Netherlands in the 17th century and died in Columbia County in 1710 as per available records. It is currently undergoing restoration by its private owner. The structure is unique by reason of its scissors- truss design being infrequently employed in the geographical area but typical of housing design seen in the Netherlands.

It was added to the National Register of Historic Places in 2010.
