= New York State Route 9G =

Highway in New York

New York State Route 9G
- Map of the Mid-Hudson Valley with NY 9G highlighted in red

Route information
- Auxiliary route of US 9
- Maintained by NYSDOT and the cities of Poughkeepsie and Hudson
- Length: 42.99 mi (69.19 km)
- Existed: 1930–present

Major junctions
- South end: US 9 in Poughkeepsie
- US 9 in Rhinebeck
- North end: US 9 / NY 23B in Hudson

Location
- Country: United States
- State: New York
- Counties: Dutchess, Columbia

Highway system
- New York Highways; Interstate; US; State; Reference; Parkways
← US 9E	NY 9F	→ NY 9H

New York State Route 9G (NY 9G) is a state highway in the Hudson Valley of New York in the United States. It runs north from U.S. Route 9 (US 9) at Poughkeepsie, starting out as Violet Avenue, then follows the Hudson River mostly along the eastern side of the US 9 to Rhinebeck, where the two routes cross just north of the village. From this point onward, NY 9G runs on the western side of US 9, closer to the Hudson River, to Hudson. It ends at another junction with US 9 in the city. NY 9G initially extended from Rhinebeck to Hudson when it was assigned as part of the 1930 renumbering of state highways in New York. It was extended to its current length in the late 1930s, supplanting New York State Route 9F, an alternate route of US 9 between Poughkeepsie and Rhinebeck.

== Route description ==
NY 9G is maintained by the New York State Department of Transportation (NYSDOT) outside of the cities of Poughkeepsie and Hudson. The portion of the route that enters the two cities is locally maintained.

=== Dutchess County ===
The highway starts at a junction with US 9 at Marist College and Saint Francis Hospital in the Dutchess County town of Poughkeepsie. It travels parallel to the Pulaski Park while heading south for a time. It turns sharply to the east for a time known as Parker Avenue. It passes north of College Hill Park and Morgan Lake prior to gradually turning north. Route 9G passes west of the Dutchess Community College, now known as Violet Avenue. Proceeding north, off to the east is the Fallkill County Park. An intersection with County Route 40 (CR 40) is not far off, while another intersection with CR 40A follows. Past CR 40A, it runs parallel to the Eleanor Roosevelt National Historic Site while it travels west of the Union Cemetery.

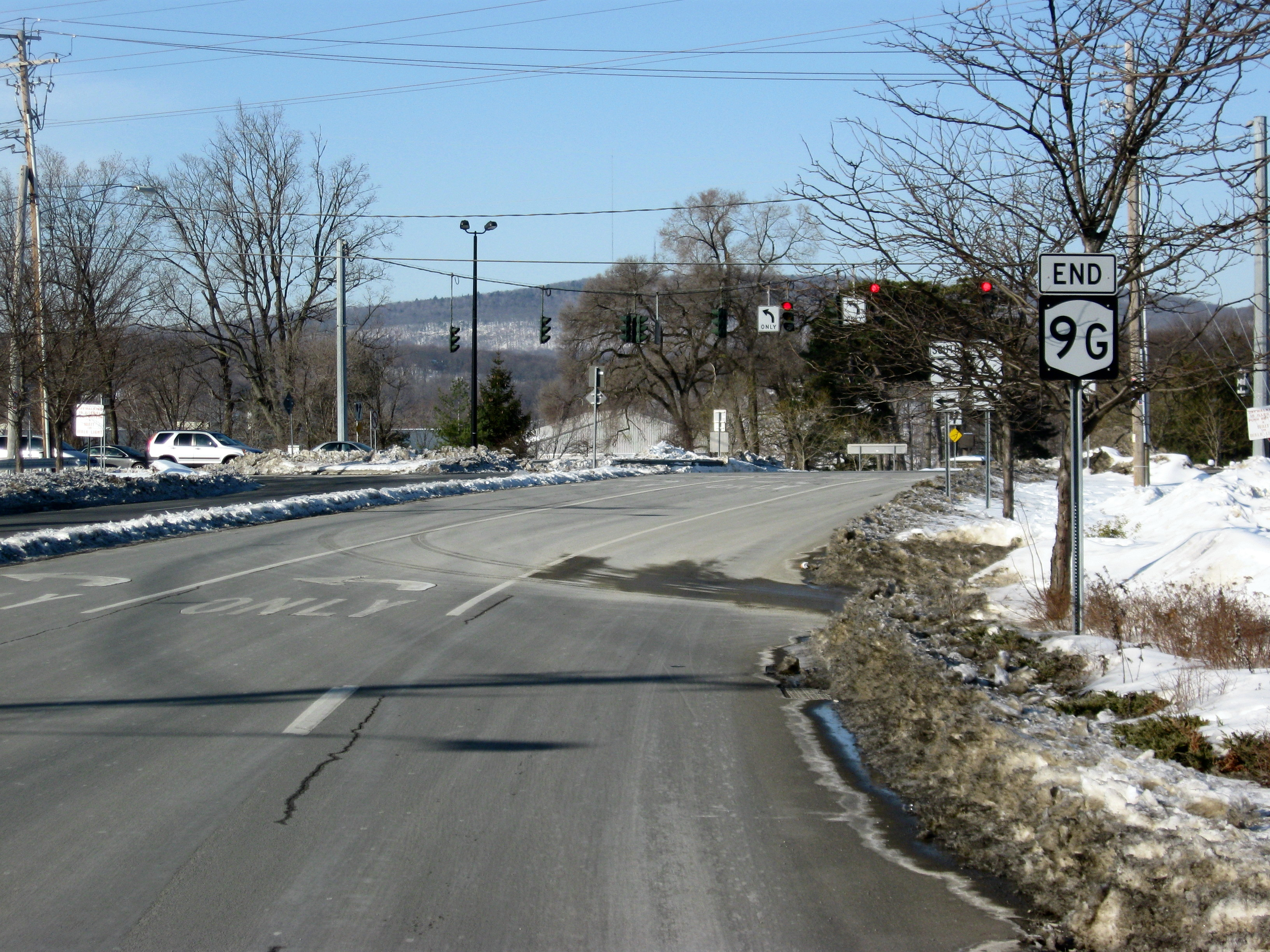
NY 9G's southern terminus at US 9 in Poughkeepsie

North of the site, NY 9G runs near a small stream for a time, while to the west is the Greentree Park. A turn to the northwest before turning due north again comes before an intersection with CR 37. The route enters DeWitt Mills, which brings an intersection with CR 14. On either side of the route are small lakes just as an intersection with CR 84 occurs. Continuing north, Burger Hill Park is to the west. From here, NY 9G meets NY 308 by way of an interchange as it enters the northern outskirts of Rhinebeck. The route crosses its parent, US 9, north of the village center, at which point it enters the Hudson River Historic District. Not far to the northwest is a junction with NY 199, which merges with NY 9G and follows it into the town of Red Hook.

NY 9G and NY 199 split at a junction west of the village of Red Hook and east of the hamlet of Barrytown. NY 199 turns eastward toward the village while NY 9G heads north into Annandale-On-Hudson. Bard College is just to the west as NY 9G becomes limited access for a short time. An intersection with CR 79 follows, just prior entering Tivoli, where NY 9G meets CR 78. This junction was once the eastern terminus of NY 402. Not far to the north of Tivoli, NY 9G crosses into Columbia County and the town of Clermont.

=== Columbia County ===
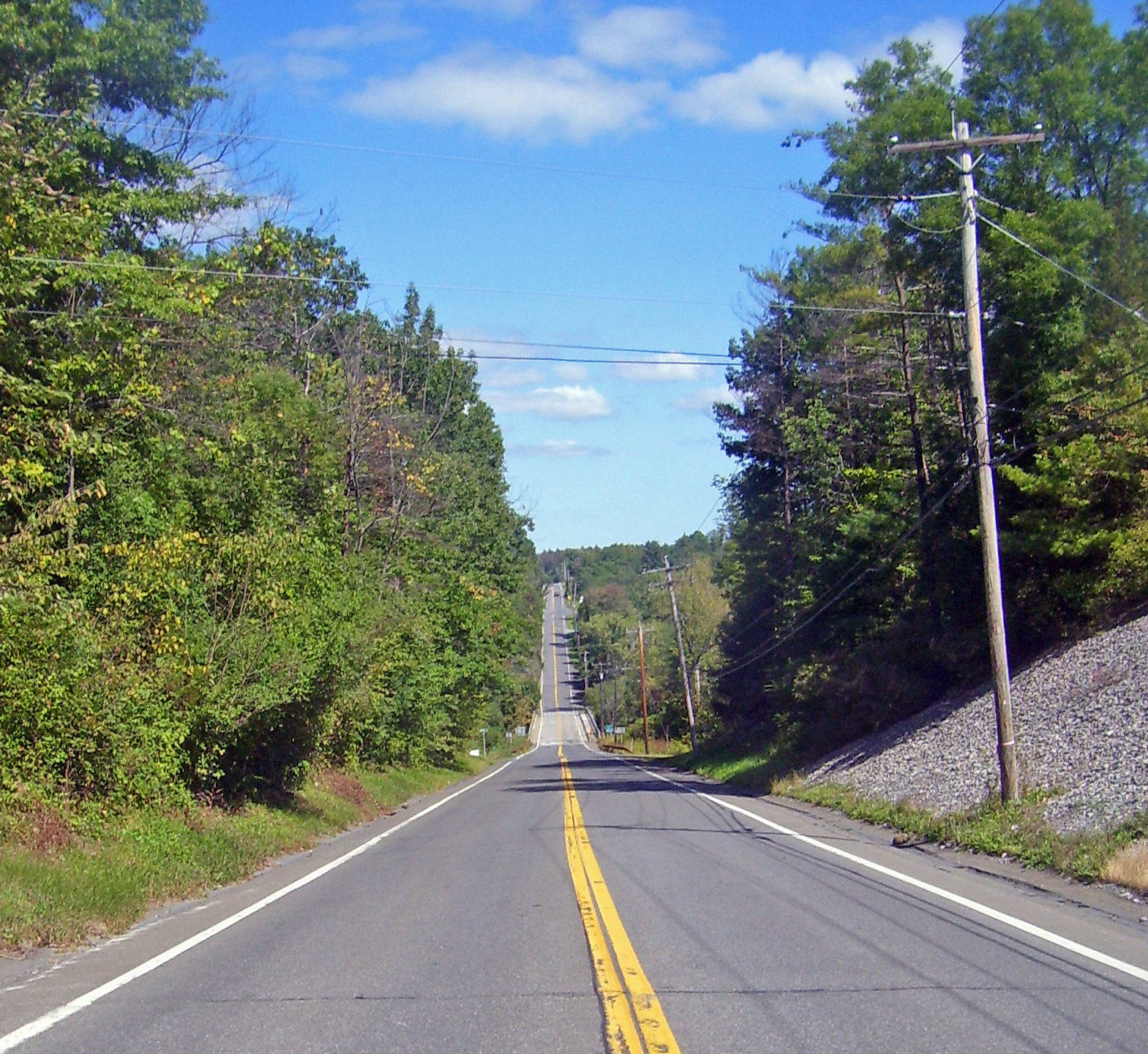
Long dip to cross creek in Germantown.

In Columbia County, NY 9G passes the Clermont State Historic Site and the Stone Jug in Clermont before proceeding north into the town of Germantown and the hamlet of the same name contained within. Outside of the hamlet, NY 9G turns to follow a more northeasterly course, matching a similar turn in the Hudson River. It crosses over Roeliff Jansen Kill on its way into the town of Greenport, where it meets NY 23 at the eastern foot of the Rip Van Winkle Bridge in a highly channelized junction adjacent to the Olana State Historic Site.

NY 9G is concurrent with NY 23 for just less than 0.3 miles (0.5 km) before leaving with NY 23B to the northeast for the city of Hudson, passing through its historic downtown. The two routes overlap from the NY 23 east junction to the US 9 junction on the east side of the city, where the concurrency and NY 9G both end. NY 23B, meanwhile, continues east of here, following US 9 for several blocks to the east toward Claverack.

== History ==
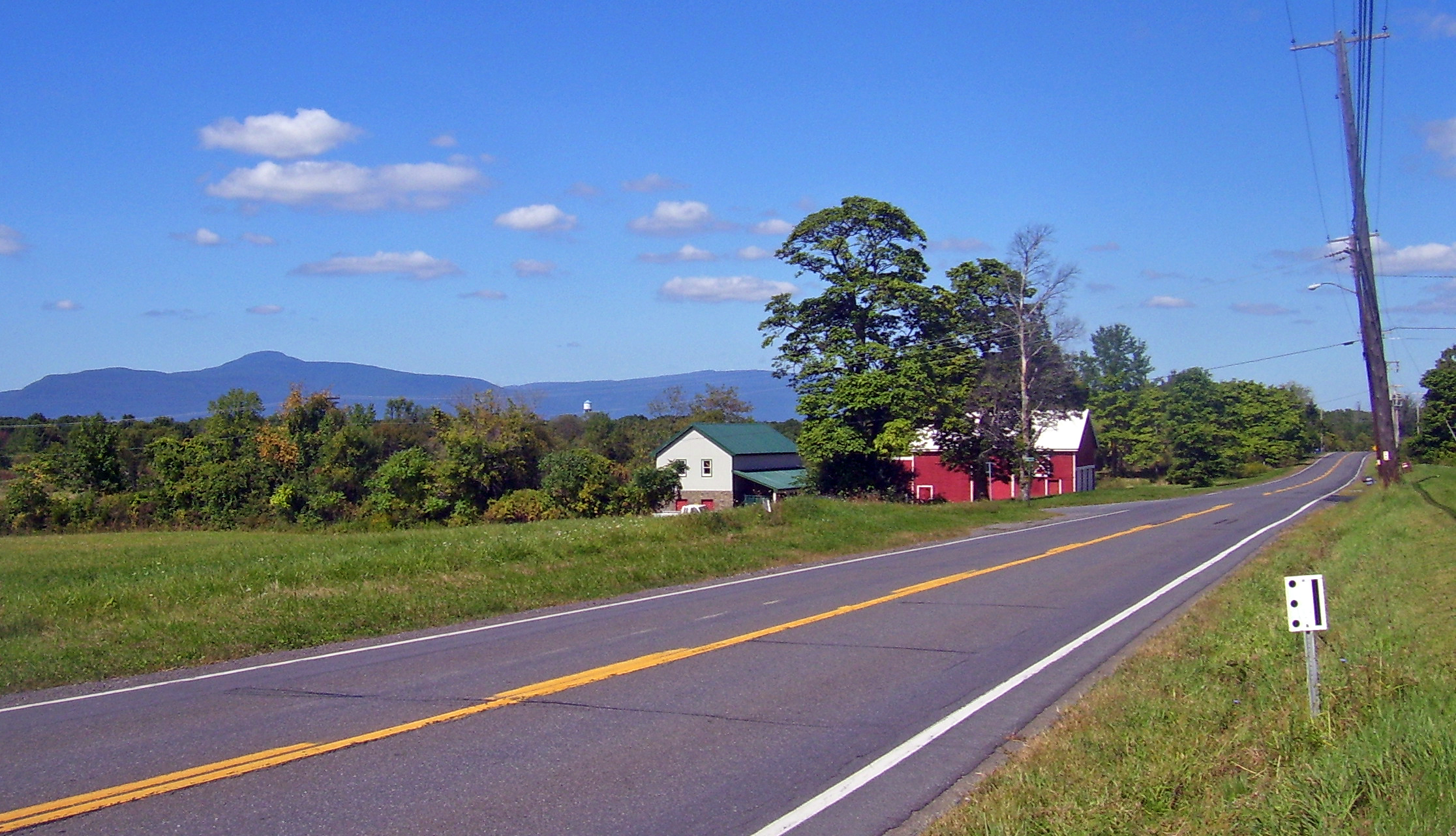
View of the Catskill Escarpment from 9G in northern Dutchess County

NY 9G was assigned as part of the 1930 renumbering of state highways in New York; however, it extended only from US 9 in Rhinebeck to US 9 in Hudson. South of Annandale-on-Hudson, NY 9G was routed on River and Mount Rutsen Roads. The portion of NY 9G between Germantown and NY 199, under construction in 1930, was opened to traffic from NY 199 to Tivoli by the following year and completed c. 1932. Farther south, an alternate route of US 9 between Poughkeepsie and Hyde Park via East Park was designated NY 9F as part of the renumbering. NY 9F was extended northward c. 1932 from East Park to Rhinebeck, where it ended at a junction with US 9 northeast of the village. NY 9F was absorbed into a rerouted and extended NY 9G c. 1938.

The former routing of NY 9G from Annandale-on-Hudson to Mount Rutsen Road along River Road is now maintained by Dutchess County as part of CR 103. In Hyde Park, the former alignment of NY 9F along Market Street remained state-maintained until April 1, 1980, when it was transferred from New York State to Dutchess County as part of a highway maintenance swap between the two levels of government. Market Street is now part of CR 41.

It has also been the site of a stretch of fatal or otherwise serious car accidents, some of which have involved hit and runs. A group of legislators is currently working on improving safety of the road between Bard College and Germantown.

== Major intersections ==
County	Location	mi	km	Destinations	Notes
Dutchess	Town of Poughkeepsie	0.00	0.00	US 9 (North Road)	Southern terminus
Dutchess	Town of Rhinebeck	18.04	29.03	NY 308 to Taconic State Parkway – Rhinebeck	Interchange
Dutchess	Town of Rhinebeck	19.45	31.30	US 9 – Red Hook, Rhinebeck, Poughkeepsie	
Dutchess	Town of Rhinebeck	20.75	33.39	NY 199 west to I-87 / New York Thruway / US 9W / US 209 south – Kingston Bridge	Southern end of NY 199 concurrency
Dutchess	Town of Red Hook	22.70	36.53	NY 199 east / CR 82 west to Taconic State Parkway – Barrytown, Red Hook	Northern end of NY 199 concurrency; western terminus of CR 82
Dutchess	Tivoli	26.81	43.15	CR 78	Former NY 402
Columbia	Greenport	39.25	63.17	NY 23 west (Rip Van Winkle Bridge) to US 9W – Catskill	Southern end of NY 23 concurrency
Columbia	Greenport	39.54	63.63	NY 23 east to Taconic State Parkway NY 23B begins	Northern end of NY 23 concurrency; western terminus of NY 23B
Columbia	Hudson	42.99	69.19	US 9 / NY 23B east	Northern terminus; northern end of NY 23B concurrency
1.000 mi = 1.609 km; 1.000 km = 0.621 mi: Concurrency terminus
