= Church of St. John the Evangelist (Stockport, New York) =

Historic church in New York, United States

- U.S. National Register of Historic Places
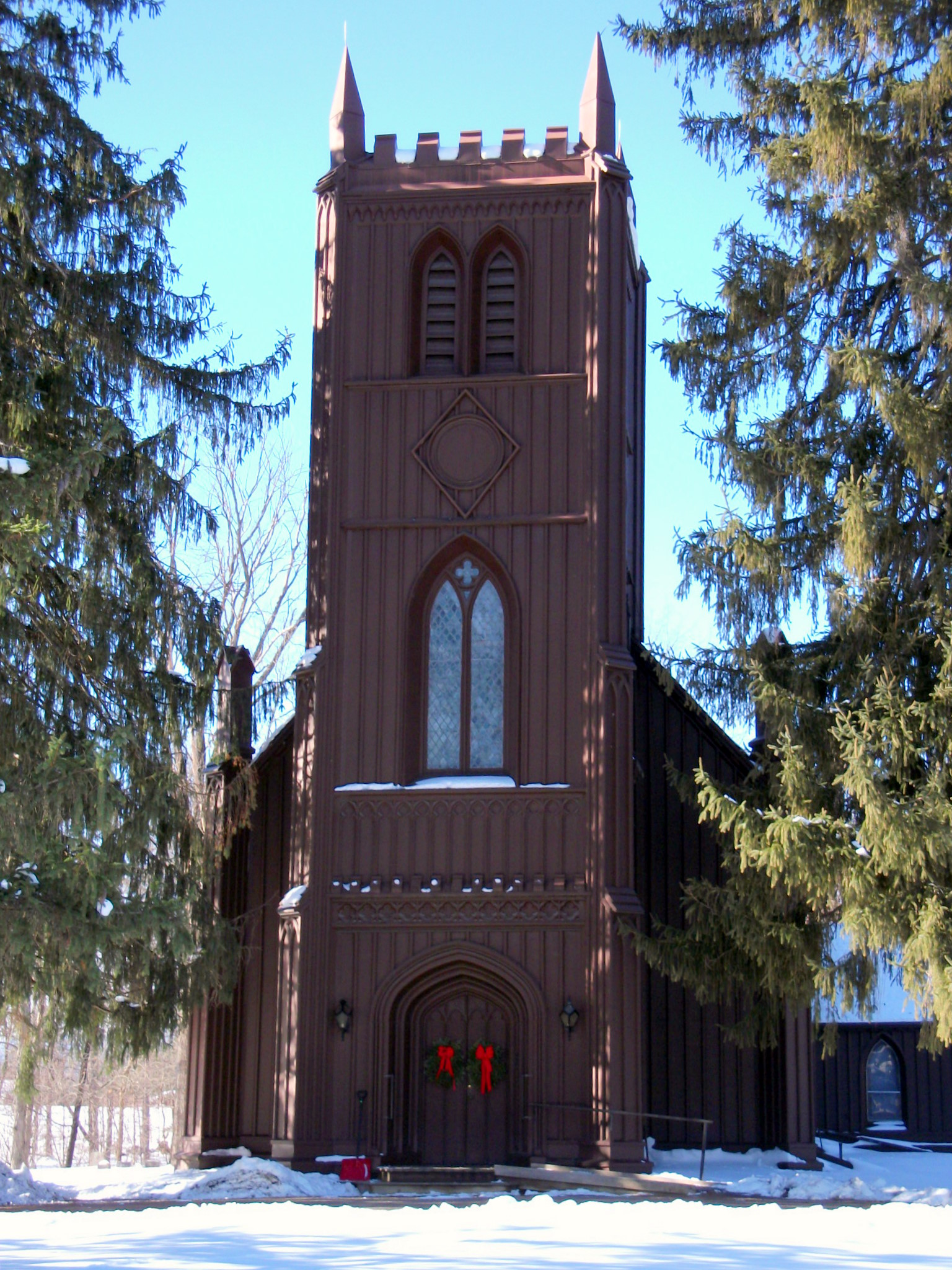
- Church of St. John the Evangelist, January 2011

- Location within New York Location within the United States
- Location: Chittenden Rd., Stockport, New York
- Coordinates: 42°18′30″N 73°44′51″W
- Area: 0 acres (0 ha)
- Built: 1846
- Architectural style: Gothic Revival
- NRHP reference No.: 72000827
- Added to NRHP: April 13, 1972

Church of St. John the Evangelist was a historic Episcopal church on Chittenden Road (a.k.a. Route 25) in Stockport, Columbia County, New York. It was completed in August, 1846 at a cost of $12,000 and consecrated by Bishop Heathcote Delancey of the Diocese of Western New York on July 3, 1847. Earlier, the Reverend Henry Townsend of the Diocese of Connecticut rode on horseback over the Berkshire Mountains to attend the original incorporation meeting on Sept. 20, 1845. St. John's was the first Episcopal church built in Columbia County, NY and its grounds bear one of two original lychgates in the county, the second being at St. Mark's Church in Philmont. St. John's was a one-story, rectangular, wood-frame building in the board-and-batten Carpenter Gothic style painted deep brown, hence its affectionate local moniker, "The Little Brown Church.". It featured a projecting center entrance tower holding a cast iron church bell, double entry doors, stained glass window and upper double vents. The main entrance, flanked by iron boot scrapers, opens to reveal a simple vestibule bearing the bell rope and a framed plaque in memory of Joseph Marshall, builder of the church, whose remains are interred beneath where the north transept was. Marshall was born in Huddersfield, England in 1773, emigrated to America in 1827, built St. John's in 1846 and died in 1848. Steep gable roofs protected the horizontal main structure containing the organ loft, nave, chancel and sanctuary. The north and south walls of the nave each contained four beautiful stained glass windows. At the building's northwest corner at right angles to the main nave was a former sacristy, which used to form the organ chamber. At the southwest corner stood the sacristy. The adjacent cemetery contains approximately 2,200 burials from 1821 to the present.

On April 13, 1972, following two years of research by historic preservationist Helen M. Ofield, the Church of St. John the Evangelist at Stockport, NY was officially designated a national historic site on the National Register of Historic Places. This event paid tribute not only to the architectural beauty and uniqueness of St. John's, but to its historical meaning as an American country church. The Town of Stockport and the church literally grew up together. The builders, communicants, and financial supporters were originally either owners of textile mills in Stockport and environs, or employees of those mills.

St. John's perfectly complemented Stockport, a quiet place dominated by pre-Civil War houses. To the south of the church stand three houses originally built by Joseph Marshall, builder of St. John's. Opposite stands the 1853 Italianate Revival home, "Maple Lawn," built by inventor Rensselaer Reynolds, who designed, built and operated the first electrically powered textile loom, and whose family helped to sustain the church. A son, Robert Burns Reynolds, built a charming Victorian home ("The Grove") in 1888 on land adjacent to the south side of the church cemetery. All of these homes thrive today in private ownership. Also opposite the church is the 1816 brick federal house built by Captain Seth Macy, the third Yankee clipper captain to sail to China. Macy sold the house to Joseph Marshall in 1828. This noble old house is in disastrous condition in 2017.

The history of Stockport is tied to the economic history of Western Europe. The 19th century was barely underway when fresh economic disasters struck the thriving textile town of Stockport, Cheshire, England. These periodic depressions altered destinies, spurred migrations and uprooted families. The scion of one such family, James Wild, 20, left Stockport for the New World, where he hoped to invest the remains of the Wild family fortune in textile manufacture. He landed in New York State in 1806 and did just that. About 1808 he settled on a site at the junction of two tributaries of the Hudson River, the Claverack and Columbiaville Creeks, and began to build up the area. He named his new-born town Stockport.

The church was demolished in 2019. The diocese hired an antiques dealer to remove it.
