= Columbiaville, New York =

- Hamlet
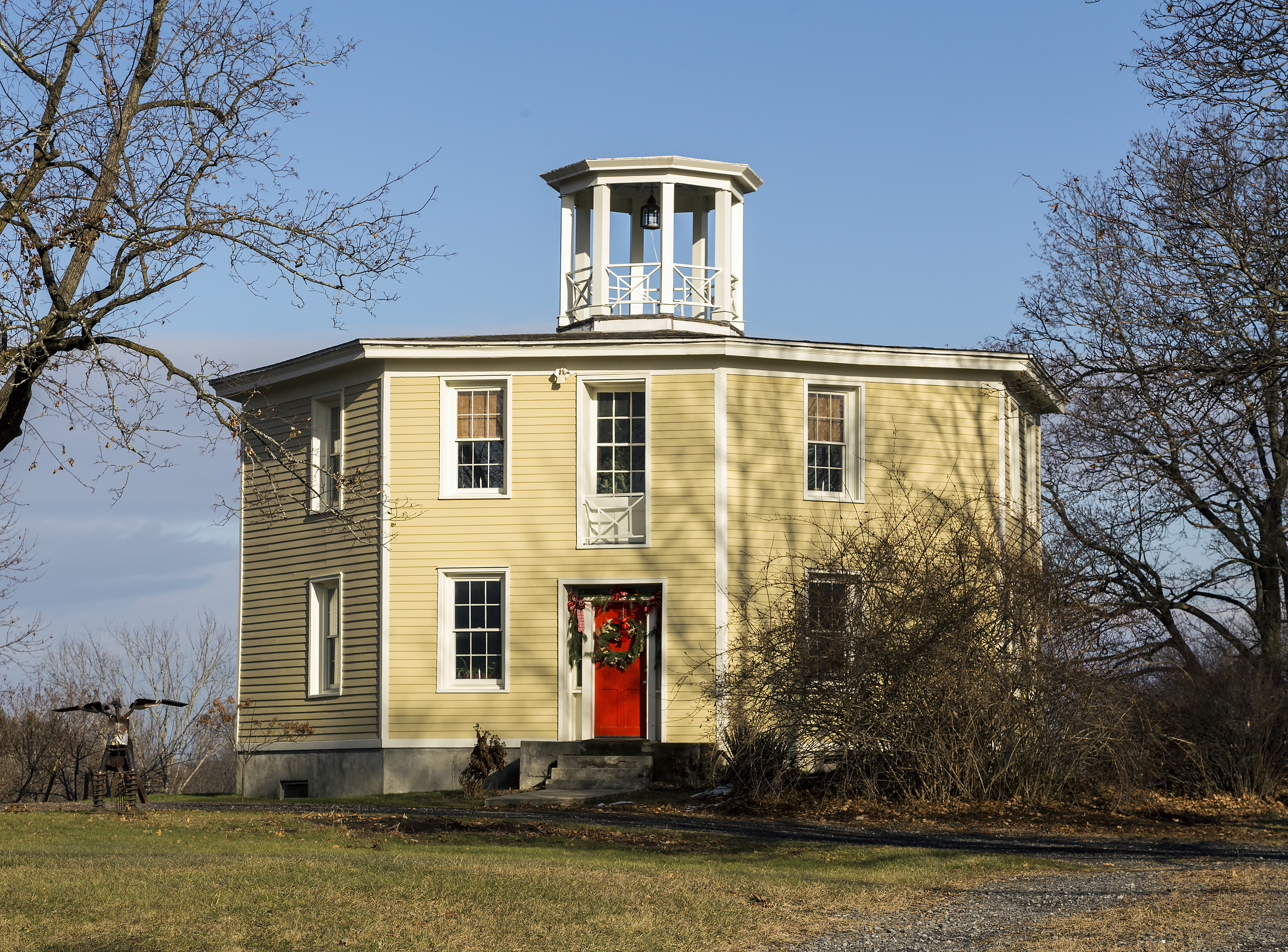
- The Octagon House of Columbiaville

- Location within New York Location within the United States
- Coordinates: 42°19′06″N 73°45′11″W
- Country: United States
- State: New York
- County: Columbia
- Elevation: 141 ft (43 m)
- Time zone: UTC-5 (Eastern (EST))
  - Summer (DST): UTC-4 (EDT)
- ZIP code: 12050
- Area codes: 518 & 838
- GNIS feature ID: 947196

Columbiaville is a hamlet in the town of Stockport, Columbia County, New York, United States. The community is located along U.S. Route 9, 4.9 miles (7.9 km) north-northeast of Hudson. Columbiaville has a post office with ZIP code 12050, which opened on December 28, 1888.
