= Stottville, New York =

- Hamlet & CDP
- Location within New York Location within the United States
- Coordinates: 42°17′7″N 73°44′53″W
- Country: United States
- State: New York
- County: Columbia
- Towns: Stockport, Greenport

Area
  - Total: 4.91 sq mi (12.71 km^{2})
  - Land: 4.88 sq mi (12.63 km^{2})
  - Water: 0.031 sq mi (0.08 km^{2})
- Elevation: 115 ft (35 m)

Population (2020)
  - Total: 1,665
  - Density: 341/sq mi (131.8/km^{2})
- Time zone: UTC-5 (Eastern (EST))
  - Summer (DST): UTC-4 (EDT)
- ZIP Codes: 12172 (Stottville); 12534 (Hudson)
- Area code: 518
- FIPS code: 36-71718
- GNIS feature ID: 0970675

Stottville is a hamlet and census-designated place (CDP) in Columbia County, New York, United States. As of the 2020 census, Stottville had a population of 1,665.

Stottville is in the southern part of the town of Stockport, south of Stockport Creek, and in the northern section of the town of Greenport.

== Geography ==
Stottville hamlet is located along Claverack Creek, a tributary of Stockport Creek, at 42°17′7″N 73°44′53″W (42.285238, -73.747933). The Stottville CDP includes most of the southern part of the town of Stockport, as well as the northernmost part of the town of Greenport. It is bordered to the north by Stockport hamlet and to the south by Lorenz Park in Greenport. The Hudson River is to the west.

U.S. Route 9 runs through Stottville, leading south 3 miles (5 km) to Hudson, the Columbia County seat, and north 9 miles (14 km) to Kinderhook.

According to the United States Census Bureau, the CDP has a total area of 4.1 square miles (11 km^{2}), of which 4.1 square miles (11 km^{2}) is land and 0.04 square miles (0.10 km^{2}) (0.48%) is water.

== Demographics ==
Historical population
Census	Pop.	Note	%±
2000	1,355		—
2010	1,375		1.5%
2020	1,665		21.1%
U.S. Decennial Census

As of the census of 2000, there were 1,355 people, 544 households, and 354 families residing in the CDP. The population density was 329.0 inhabitants per square mile (127.0/km^{2}). There were 582 housing units at an average density of 141.3 per square mile (54.6/km^{2}). The racial makeup of the CDP was 94.98% White, 1.70% African American, 0.44% Native American, 0.52% Asian, 0.59% from other races, and 1.77% from two or more races. Hispanic or Latino of any race were 2.14% of the population.

There were 544 households, out of which 30.3% had children under the age of 18 living with them, 47.4% were married couples living together, 11.9% had a female householder with no husband present, and 34.9% were non-families. 29.2% of all households were made up of individuals, and 14.9% had someone living alone who was 65 years of age or older. The average household size was 2.47 and the average family size was 2.98.

In the CDP, the population was spread out, with 25.2% under the age of 18, 7.0% from 18 to 24, 28.6% from 25 to 44, 23.2% from 45 to 64, and 16.0% who were 65 years of age or older. The median age was 39 years. For every 100 females, there were 90.6 males. For every 100 females age 18 and over, there were 89.3 males.

The median income for a household in the CDP was $36,696, and the median income for a family was $44,688. Males had a median income of $31,250 versus $24,044 for females. The per capita income for the CDP was $17,419. About 15.5% of families and 19.7% of the population were below the poverty line, including 34.9% of those under age 18 and 10.1% of those age 65 or over.
