= Columbia County Airport =

Airport in New York, United States

- IATA: HCC; ICAO: none; FAA LID: 1B1

Summary
- Airport type: Public
- Owner: County of Columbia
- Serves: Hudson, New York
- Elevation AMSL: 198 ft (60 m)
- Coordinates: 42°17′29″N 073°42′37″W
- Interactive map of Columbia County Airport

Runways
Direction	Length		Surface
Direction	ft	m	Surface
3/21	5,350	1,631	Asphalt

Statistics (2007)
- Aircraft operations: 19,200
- Based aircraft: 32
- Source: Federal Aviation Administration

Columbia County Airport (IATA: HCC, FAA LID: 1B1) is a county-owned public use airport in Columbia County, New York, United States. The airport is located four nautical miles (7 km) northeast of the central business district of Hudson, New York. It is a small un-towered general aviation airport in the Hudson Valley.

== Facilities and aircraft ==
Columbia County Airport covers an area of 260 acres (110 ha) at an elevation of 198 feet (60 m) above mean sea level. It has one asphalt paved runway designated 3/21 which measures 5,350 by 100 feet (1,631 x 30 m).

Final approach for runway 21 is directly over a golf course immediately to the north, and pilots should take caution on arrival and departure to avoid golfers. There has been at least one incident of a golfer intentionally hitting a landing aircraft with a golf ball. Departure path for runway 3 takes the pilot over homes. Pilots should be mindful of noise, especially at night. There is a police shooting range approximately 1 mile to the east, so gunshot sounds are not uncommon.

For the 12-month period ending June 29, 2007, the airport had 19,200 aircraft operations, an average of 52 per day: 78% general aviation, 21% air taxi and 1% military. At that time there were 32 aircraft based at this airport: 81% single-engine, 16% multi-engine and 3% jet.

Richmor Aviation operates out of the Columbia County Airport as the FBO providing fuel, tie-down, hangar, aircraft management, charter & maintenance.

== Accidents and incidents ==
- April 12, 2025: A Mitsubishi MU-2B-40, aircraft registration N635TA, crashed approximately 7 miles (11 km) southeast of the airport in the town of Copake, New York, after the pilot initiated a missed approach in deteriorating weather. All six people on board were killed. The flight originated at Westchester County Airport in White Plains, New York. The National Transportation Safety Board is investigating the cause of the accident.

== See also ==
- List of airports in New York
