= Rip Van Winkle Bridge =

Bridge crossing the Hudson River in New York, United States

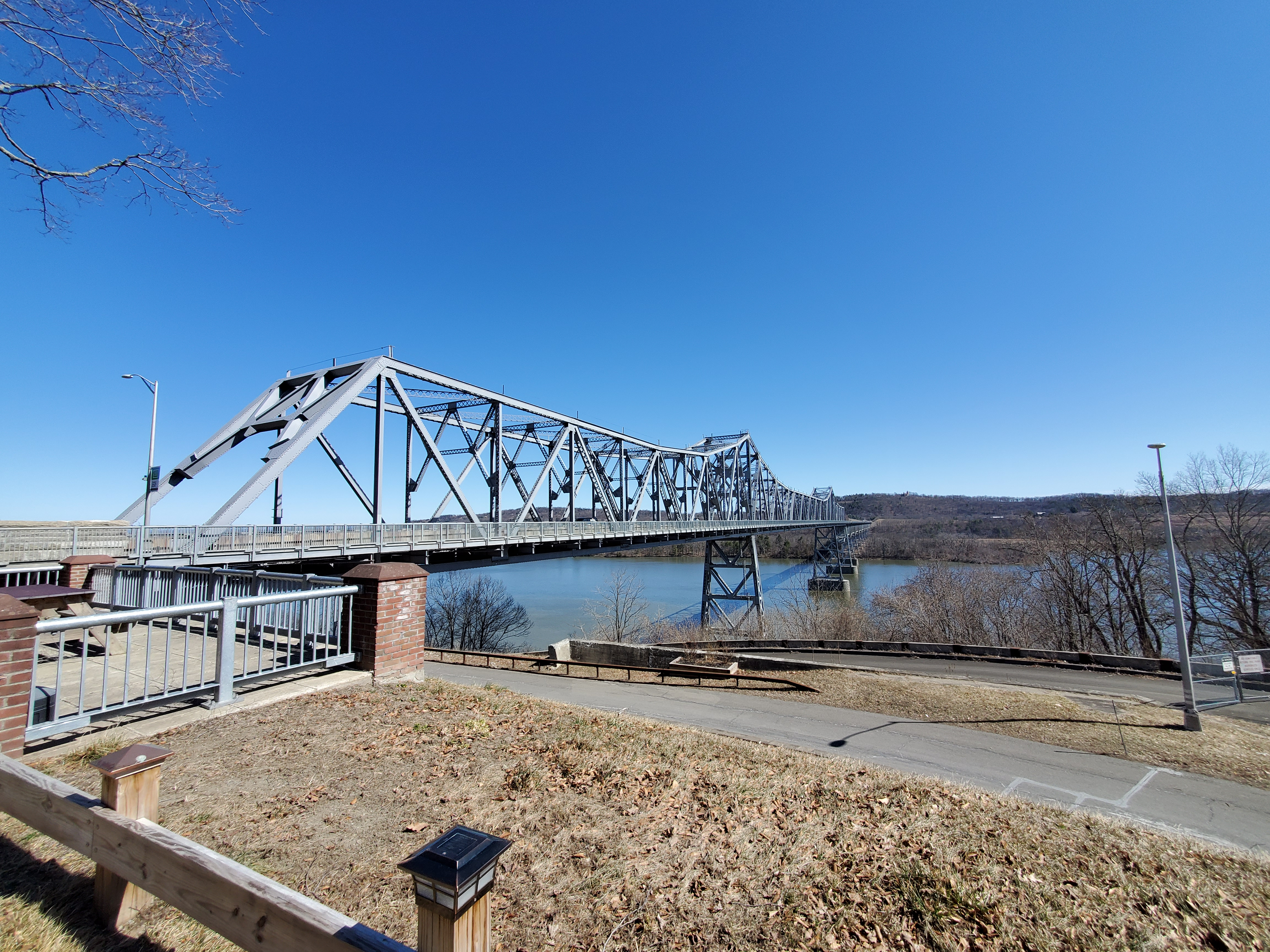
- Rip Van Winkle Bridge from the western end plaza
- Coordinates: 42.22358°N 73.85038°W
- Carries: NY 23
- Crosses: Hudson River
- Locale: Hudson, New York and Catskill, New York
- Maintained by: New York State Bridge Authority

Characteristics
- Design: Cantilever and truss
- Total length: 5,040 ft (1,536.5 m)
- Width: 30 ft (9.1 m)
- Longest span: 800 ft (243.8 m)
- Clearance above: K
- Clearance below: 145 ft (44.2 m)

History
- Opened: July 2, 1935; 89 years ago

Statistics
- Daily traffic: 15,000
- Toll: (eastbound only) passenger cars $2.15 toll-by-mail, $1.65 E-ZPass

The Rip Van Winkle Bridge is a 5,040 ft (1,540 m) cantilever bridge spanning the Hudson River between Hudson, New York and Catskill, New York. Affording 145 feet (44 m) of clearance over the water, the structure carries NY 23 across the river, connecting US 9W and NY 385 on the west side with NY 9G on the east side. The bridge also passes over Rogers Island and Hallenbeck Creek.

The bridge is named after the 1819 short story of the same name by Washington Irving, which mentions Hudson and Catskill.

== Construction ==
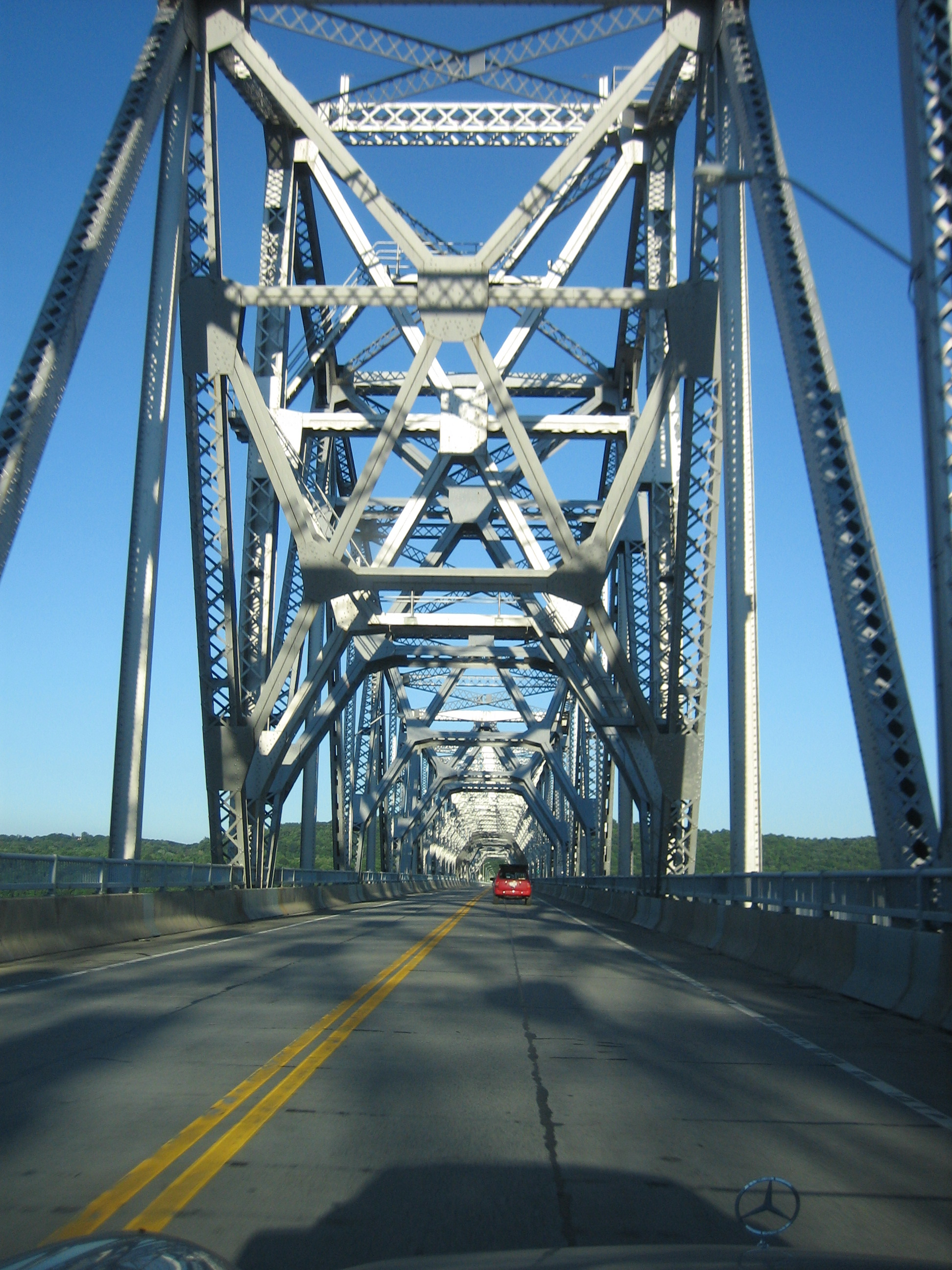
Crossing the bridge eastbound in the summer

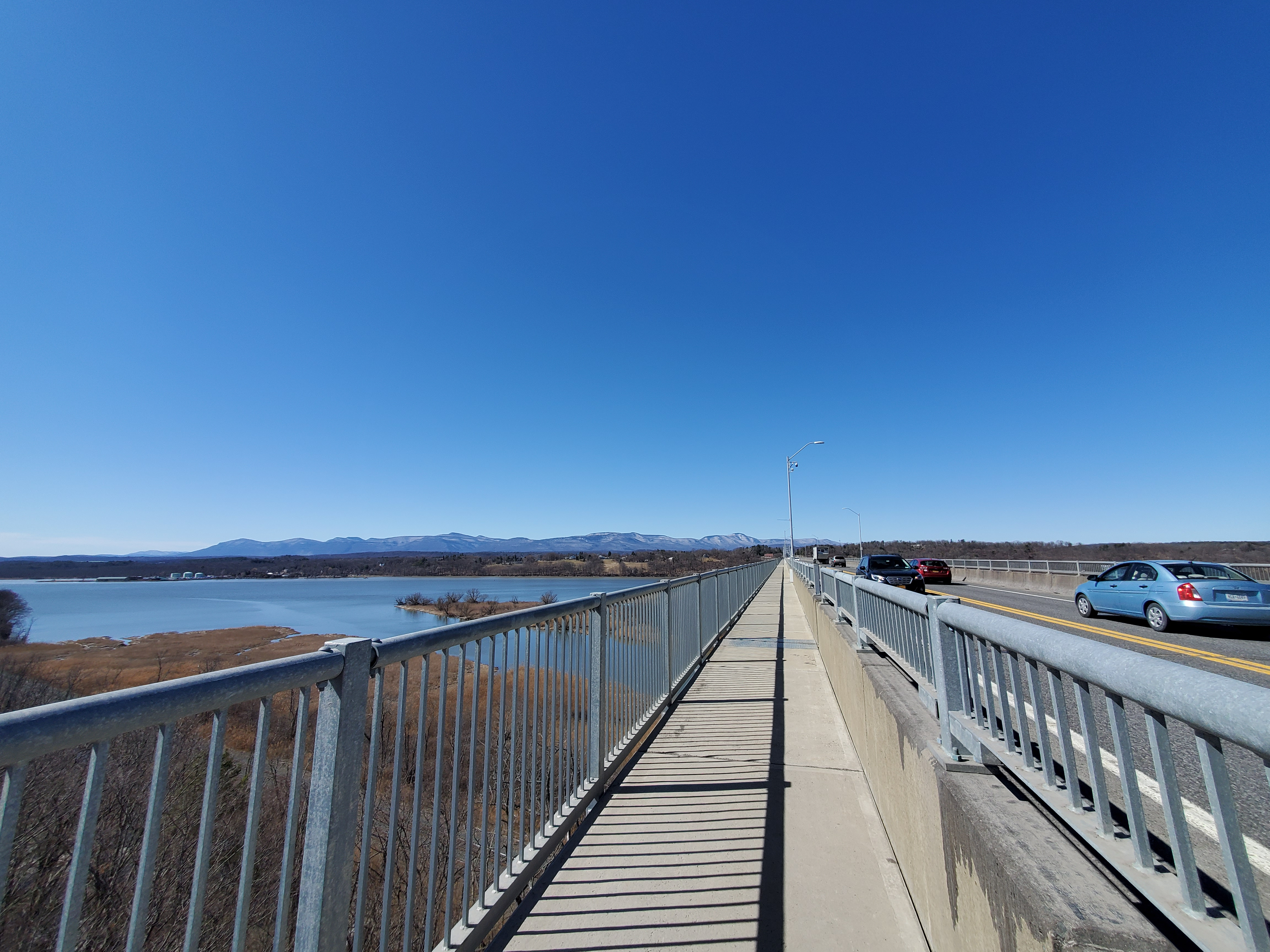
View west along the bridge walkway in late Winter

=== Erecting the bridge ===
The bridge was built by the newly created New York State Bridge Authority, opening on July 2, 1935, at a cost of $2.4 million ($55,040,000 with inflation).

A fireworks display marked the 50th anniversary of the bridge's construction in 1985.

A multi-year repainting project was completed in 2009 which removed all lead-based paint.

A pedestrian walkway was completed in 2018 on the south side of the bridge. It is open from dawn to dusk.

Bicyclists may use the roadway or walk their bikes across the pedestrian walkway. The walkway is also a link on the Hudson River Skywalk, which connects the homes of Hudson River School painters Thomas Cole and Frederic Church.

== Tolls ==
Upon its opening, the toll was $0.80 ($18.35 with inflation) per passenger car and $0.10 ($2.29 with inflation) per passenger up to $1 ($22.93 with inflation). Originally, tolls were collected in both directions. In August 1970, the toll was abolished for westbound drivers, and at the same time, eastbound drivers saw their tolls doubled. The tolls of eleven other New York–New Jersey and Hudson River crossings along a 130-mile (210 km) stretch, from the Outerbridge Crossing in the south to the Rip Van Winkle Bridge in the north, were also changed to eastbound-only at that time.

In 2019, the bridge authority announced that tolls on its Hudson River crossings would increase each year beginning in 2020 and ending in 2023. On May 1, 2021, the toll for passenger cars traveling eastbound on the Mid-Hudson Bridge went to $1.75 in cash and $1.45 for E-ZPass users. In May 2022, tolls increased to $1.55 for E-ZPass users and $2 for toll-by-mail payers. In 2023, the E-ZPass toll rose to $1.65, and the mail-in toll increased to $2.15.

At midnight on November 1, 2021, the bridge was converted to all-electronic tolling.

== See also ==
- List of fixed crossings of the Hudson River

== External links and Resources ==
- Photosphere from Rip Van Winkle Bridge Walkway
- New York State Bridge Authority - Official site
- Historical Overview: Rip Van Winkle Bridge - NYCRoads.com
- Rip van Winkle Bridge at Structurae
