= Stockport, New York =

- Town
- Location of Stockport, New York
- Coordinates: 42°18′37″N 73°44′59″W
- Country: United States
- State: New York
- County: Columbia

Government
  - Type: Town Council
  - Town Supervisor: Matt Murrell(R)
  - Town Council: Members' List: • Norma M. Kirker (D, R); • Paul Knott (R); • Joseph Salvatore Jr. (R); • Kathleen Hamm (R)

Area
  - Total: 13.15 sq mi (34.07 km^{2})
  - Land: 11.65 sq mi (30.17 km^{2})
  - Water: 1.51 sq mi (3.90 km^{2})
- Elevation: 130 ft (40 m)

Population (2020)
  - Total: 2,670
  - Density: 229/sq mi (88.5/km^{2})
- Time zone: UTC-5 (Eastern (EST))
  - Summer (DST): UTC-4 (EDT)
- ZIP Codes: 12534 (Hudson); 12172 (Stottville); 12173 (Stuyvesant)
- FIPS code: 36-021-71443
- GNIS feature ID: 0979529
- Website: www.stockportny.gov

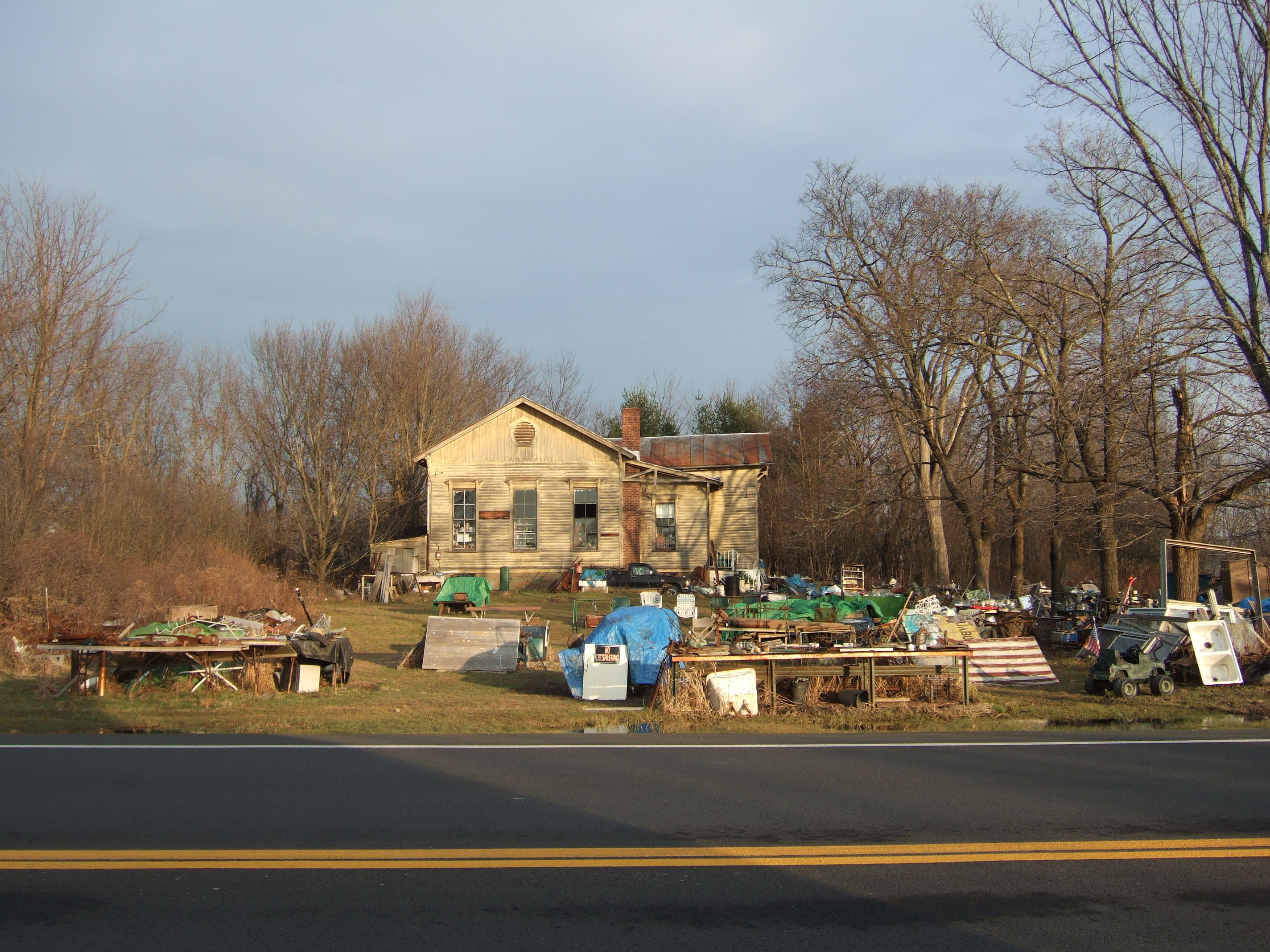
Stockport, New York

Stockport is a town in Columbia County, New York, United States. The population was 2,670 at the 2020 census, down from 2,815 at the 2010 census.

Stockport is in the northwestern part of the county, along the Hudson River.

== History ==
The region was settled around 1657 and the Staats House dates from this early period.

Stockport was created in 1833 from parts of the towns of Ghent and Stuyvesant and the city of Hudson. The Church of St. John the Evangelist was listed on the National Register of Historic Places in 1972.

== Geography ==
According to the United States Census Bureau, the town has a total area of 13.2 square miles (34.1 km^{2}), of which 11.7 square miles (30.2 km^{2}) is land and 1.5 square miles (3.9 km^{2}), or 11.45%, is water.

The western town line is defined by the center of the Hudson River, which marks the border of Greene County. Stockport Creek is a tributary of the Hudson that is formed near the center of the town by the junction of Kinderhook and Claverack creeks.

== Demographics ==
Historical population
Census	Pop.	Note	%±
1840	1,815		—
1850	1,655		−8.8%
1860	1,445		−12.7%
1870	1,438		−0.5%
1880	1,980		37.7%
1890	2,345		18.4%
1900	2,719		15.9%
1910	2,506		−7.8%
1920	1,909		−23.8%
1930	2,422		26.9%
1940	2,229		−8.0%
1950	2,054		−7.9%
1960	2,025		−1.4%
1970	2,324		14.8%
1980	2,847		22.5%
1990	3,085		8.4%
2000	2,933		−4.9%
2010	2,815		−4.0%
2020	2,670		−5.2%
U.S. Decennial Census 2020

As of the census of 2000, there were 2,933 people, 1,116 households, and 805 families residing in the town. The population density was 251.9 inhabitants per square mile (97.3/km^{2}). There were 1,204 housing units at an average density of 103.4 per square mile (39.9/km^{2}). The racial makeup of the town was 96.49% White, 1.60% African American, 0.17% Native American, 0.10% Asian, 0.44% from other races, and 1.19% from two or more races. Hispanic or Latino of any race were 1.81% of the population.

There were 1,116 households, out of which 34.4% had children under the age of 18 living with them, 55.6% were married couples living together, 11.4% had a female householder with no husband present, and 27.8% were non-families. 22.2% of all households were made up of individuals, and 7.9% had someone living alone who was 65 years of age or older. The average household size was 2.62 and the average family size was 3.04.

In the town, the population was spread out, with 26.2% under the age of 18, 7.0% from 18 to 24, 30.2% from 25 to 44, 25.4% from 45 to 64, and 11.2% who were 65 years of age or older. The median age was 37 years. For every 100 females, there were 96.6 males. For every 100 females age 18 and over, there were 96.8 males.

The median income for a household in the town was $42,107, and the median income for a family was $46,857. Males had a median income of $33,664 versus $25,959 for females. The per capita income for the town was $18,137. About 10.0% of families and 12.5% of the population were below the poverty line, including 22.4% of those under age 18 and 7.1% of those age 65 or over.

== Communities and locations in Stockport ==
- Columbiaville – A hamlet near the geographic center of town, north of Stockport Creek on U.S. Route 9.
- Rossman – A hamlet northeast of Columbiaville by Kinderhook Creek.
- Stockport – The hamlet of Stockport is south of Stockport Creek on Route 9.
- Stottville – A hamlet near the southern town line that extends into Greenport.

Stockport is served by two volunteer fire companies, the Stockport Volunteer Fire Co. No. 1 and the Stottville Volunteer Fire Co. No. 2.

== Notable person ==
- Jasper Holmes (1900–1986), US Navy Intelligence Analyst
