= Greenport, Columbia County, New York =

Greenport, New York
- Town
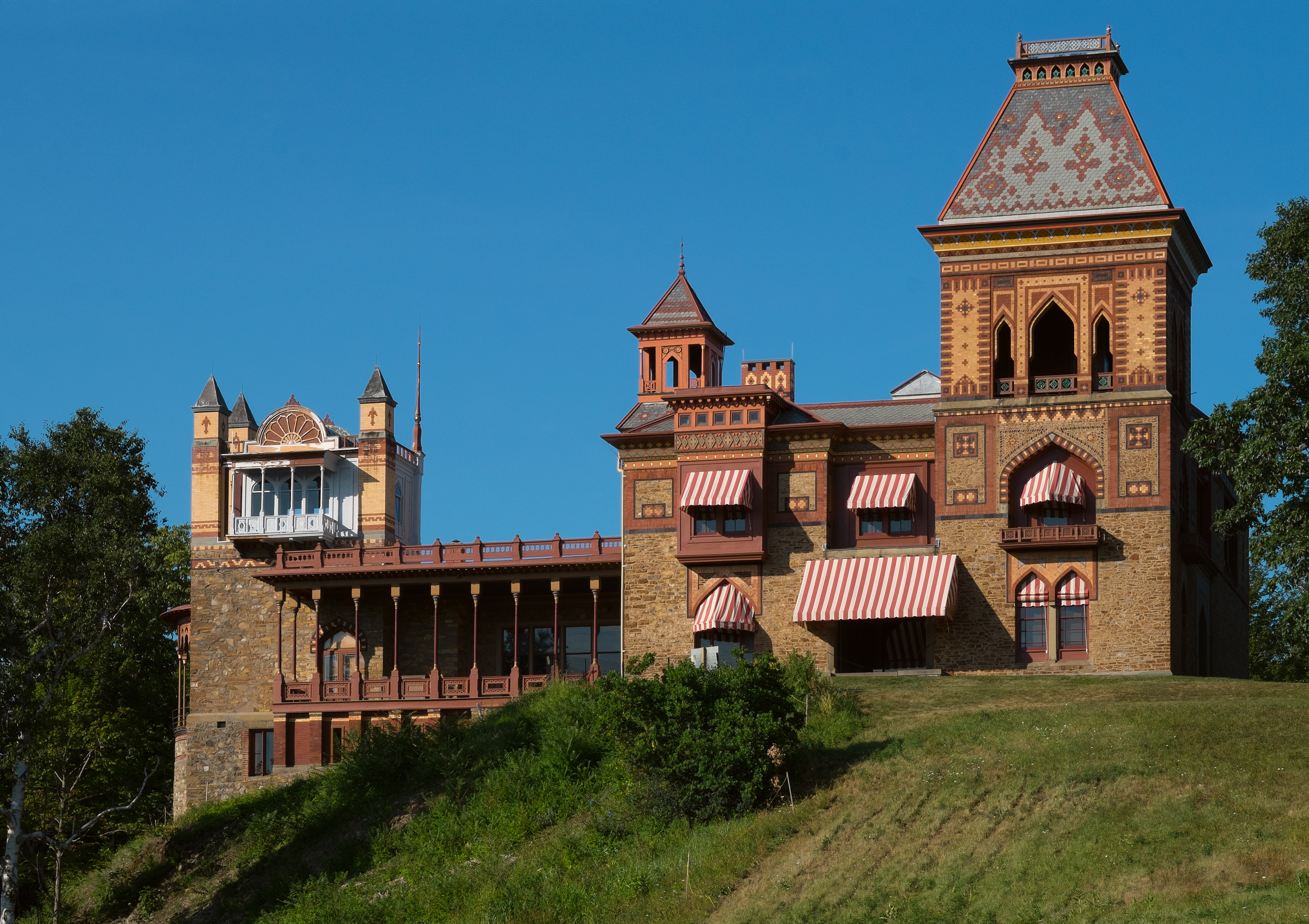
- Olana State Historic Site in Greenport

- Location of Greenport, New York
- Coordinates: 42°13′50″N 73°47′42″W
- Country: United States
- State: New York
- County: Columbia
- Established: 1837

Government
  - Type: Town Council
  - Town Supervisor: Kathleen Eldridge (D)
  - Town Council: Members' List: • Guy Apicella (D); • Janice Brodowski (D); • Clayton Clark (R); • Keith Mortefolio (R)

Area
  - Total: 20.5 sq mi (53.1 km^{2})
  - Land: 18.6 sq mi (48.2 km^{2})
  - Water: 1.9 sq mi (4.9 km^{2})
- Elevation: 95 ft (29 m)

Population (2020)
  - Total: 4,473
  - Density: 240/sq mi (92.8/km^{2})
- Time zone: UTC-5 (Eastern (EST))
  - Summer (DST): UTC-4 (EDT)
- ZIP Code: 12534 (Hudson)
- Area code: 518
- FIPS code: 36-30565
- GNIS feature ID: 0979021
- Website: www.townofgreenportny.gov

Greenport is a town in Columbia County, New York, United States. The population was 4,473 at the 2020 census, up from 4,165 in the 2010. The town is on the western border of the county and surrounds the city of Hudson on three sides. It is the third largest municipality in southern Columbia County, after Claverack and Hudson.

Olana State Historic Site is located in the southern part of the town. It was the former home of Hudson artist Frederic Edwin Church and is decorated in a Persian style.

== History ==
The region was explored by Henry Hudson in 1609. The town was established in 1837 from part of the city of Hudson and was previously part of the town of Claverack. Greenport was the last town founded in the county.

The Van Salsbergen House, built about 1700, was added to the National Register of Historic Places in 2010. Also listed are the Columbia Turnpike-West Tollhouse, Turtle House, and Henry (Hendrick) I. Van Rensselaer House.

== Geography ==
According to the United States Census Bureau, Greenport has a total area of 20.5 square miles (53.1 km^{2}), of which 18.6 square miles (48.2 km^{2}) is land and 1.9 square miles (4.9 km^{2}), or 9.18%, is water.

The western town line is defined by the city of Hudson and the center of the Hudson River, with Greene County on the opposite shore. The town of Stockport is north of Greenport. East of Greenport is Claverack, and south of the town is Livingston

US 9 passes through the town. New York Route 23B runs east-west through the town. The New York Route 23 bridge in the southern part of the town connects Greenport to the village of Catskill.

== Demographics ==
Historical population
Census	Pop.	Note	%±
1840	1,161		—
1850	1,300		12.0%
1860	1,431		10.1%
1870	1,325		−7.4%
1880	1,275		−3.8%
1890	1,247		−2.2%
1900	1,191		−4.5%
1910	1,639		37.6%
1920	1,103		−32.7%
1930	1,800		63.2%
1940	1,864		3.6%
1950	2,055		10.2%
1960	3,299		60.5%
1970	3,686		11.7%
1980	4,029		9.3%
1990	4,101		1.8%
2000	4,180		1.9%
2010	4,165		−0.4%
2020	4,473		7.4%
U.S. Decennial Census

As of the census of 2000, there were 4,180 people, 1,777 households, and 1,144 families residing in the town. The population density was 222.7 inhabitants per square mile (86.0/km^{2}). There were 1,896 housing units at an average density of 101.0 per square mile (39.0/km^{2}). The racial makeup of the town was 91.10% White, 5.10% African American, 0.24% Native American, 0.89% Asian, 0.84% from other races, and 1.84% from two or more races. Hispanic or Latino of any race were 3.49% of the population.

There were 1,777 households, out of which 25.9% had children under the age of 18 living with them, 48.8% were married couples living together, 11.8% had a female householder with no husband present, and 35.6% were non-families. 29.8% of all households were made up of individuals, and 16.4% had someone living alone who was 65 years of age or older. The average household size was 2.28 and the average family size was 2.83.

In the town, the population was spread out, with 21.1% under the age of 18, 6.4% from 18 to 24, 26.8% from 25 to 44, 25.1% from 45 to 64, and 20.6% who were 65 years of age or older. The median age was 42 years. For every 100 females, there were 93.3 males. For every 100 females age 18 and over, there were 87.8 males.

The median income for a household in the town was $37,394, and the median income for a family was $47,452. Males had a median income of $35,250 versus $26,381 for females. The per capita income for the town was $20,543. About 6.1% of families and 10.3% of the population were below the poverty line, including 13.2% of those under age 18 and 5.3% of those age 65 or over.

== Communities and locations in Greenport ==
- Columbia–Greene Community College – A two-year public college in the southern part of the town, near the Olana Historical site.
- Greendale – A hamlet in the southwestern section of the town, on the east bank of the Hudson River.
- Greenport Center – A hamlet in the northeastern part of the town.
- Hudson – The city of Hudson is surrounded on three sides by the northern part of the town.
- Lorenz Park – A hamlet in the northern part of the town, north of Hudson, and hosts several large retailers.
- Olana State Historic Site – This home of a former artist is in the southern part of the town.
- Rogers Island – An island in the Hudson River in the southwestern section of the town. Formerly known as Vastrick Island, in 1628 it was the scene of the decisive battle in the Beaver War between the Mohican and Mohawk Tribes for control of the Hudson River beaver trade with the Dutch. The battle initially took place nearby onshore in Columbia County but as the Mohicans gained the upper hand, the Mohawk tribe retreated to Vastrick Island. That evening, the Mohicans arrived on the island and launched an attack on what they believed were the Mohawks, sleeping in blankets next to camp fires. After their initial salvo, the Mohicans discovered that the "Indians" were simply blankets wrapped around brush and that they were outflanked by the Mohawks. The result of the battle was the utter decimation of the Mohican warriors and the Indian nation abandoned its Hudson Valley Homeland, retreating to the Taghkanic range in Connecticut. Local legend has it that the island has been haunted by the specters of the slaughtered Mohicans ever since.
- Stottville – A hamlet and census-designated place locked in the northern section of town that extends into Stockport.

== Notable people ==
- Frederic Edwin Church, Hudson River School painter
- Kirsten Gillibrand (b. 1966), US senator, former congresswoman
