= Lynagh =

Lynagh is a surname. Notable persons with that surname include:

- Gary Lynagh (born 1970), Australian lightweight rower
- Jim Lynagh (1956–1987) member of the East Tyrone Brigade of the Provisional Irish Republican Army
- Louis Lynagh (born 2000), professional rugby union player
- Michael Lynagh (born 1963), Australian former rugby union player
- Tom Lynagh (born 2003), Australian rugby union player

== See also ==
- Lynch (disambiguation)
