= Lynch =

Lynch may refer to:

== Places ==
=== Australia ===
- Lynch Island, South Orkney Islands, Antarctica
- Lynch Point, Marie Byrd Land, Antarctica
- Lynch's Crater, Queensland, Australia

=== England ===
- River Lynch, Hertfordshire
- The Lynch, an island in the River Thames in Berkshire
- Lynch, a hamlet in the parish of Selworthy, Somerset

=== United States ===
- Lynch, Kentucky, a city
- Lynch, Maryland, an unincorporated community
- Lynch, Nebraska, a village
- Lynch Creek, California
- Lynch Glacier, Washington
- Lynch Quarry Site, North Dakota, a pre-Columbian flint quarry
- Lynch River, Virginia
- Lynch Township, Boyd County, Nebraska

== People ==
- Lynch (surname)
  - List of people with surname Lynch
- Lynch (given name), any of several people

== Other uses ==
- Lynch (band) (styled lynch.), a Japanese rock band
- 7824 Lynch, an asteroid
- USS Lynch, any of several ships
- Lynch Fragments. a series of abstract metal sculptures by Melvin Edwards
- Lynch School of Education and Human Development, within Boston College
- Lynch Hotel, in Newton Hook, New York
- Lynch syndrome, a medical condition
- Lynch Building, former name of 11 East Forsyth in Jacksonville, Florida
- Lynch, an Old English term for an agricultural terrace

== See also ==
- Lynch House (disambiguation)
- Lynching, an extrajudicial execution carried out by a mob
- Lynches River, North Carolina, United States
- Linch, Wyoming, United States
- Linch, a small parish in West Sussex, England
