= Megafauna =

Large animals

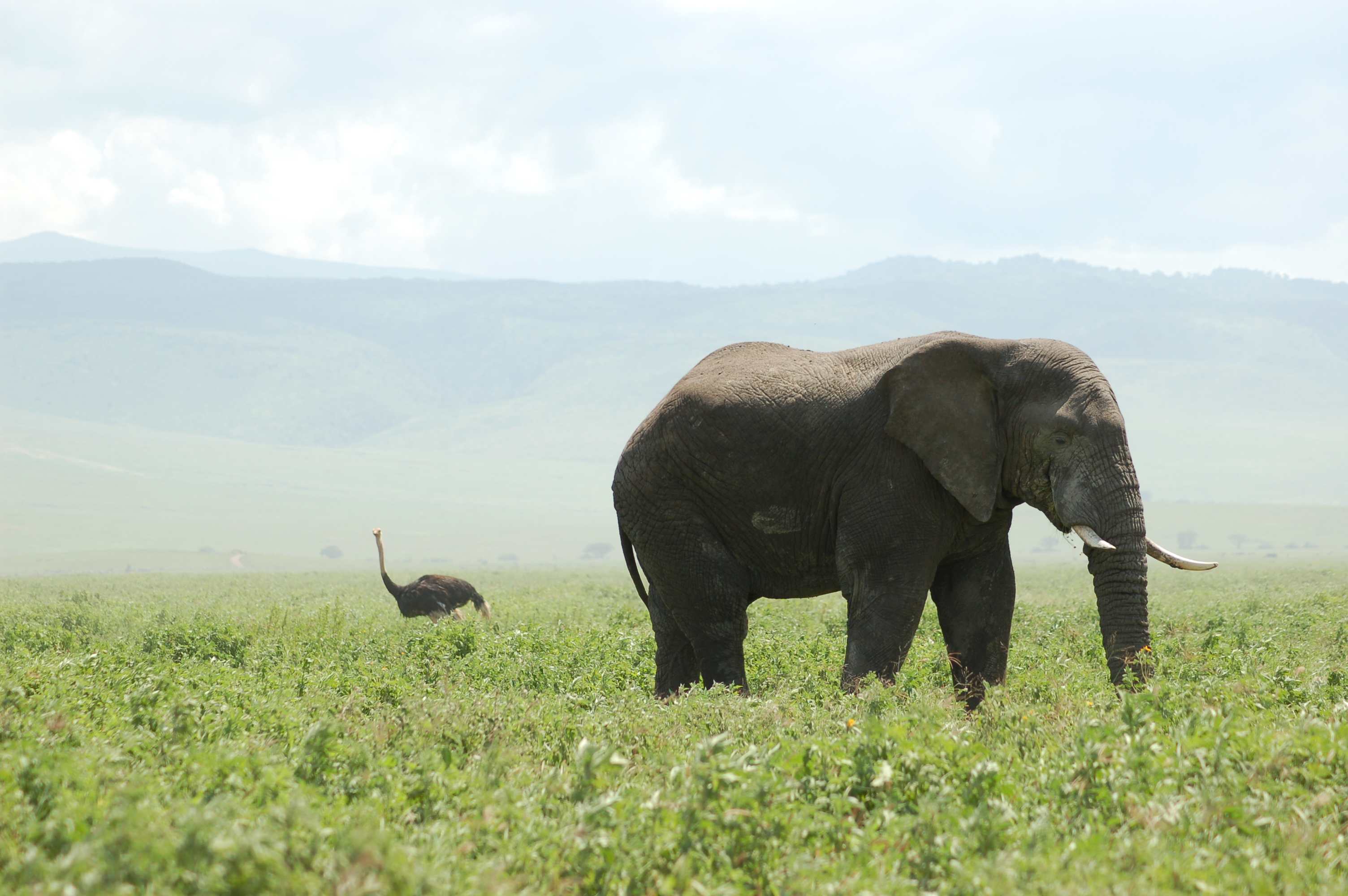
The African bush elephant (foreground), Earth's largest extant land animal, and the Masai ostrich (background), one of Earth's largest extant birds

In zoology, megafauna (from Greek μέγας megas 'large' and Neo-Latin fauna 'animal life') are large animals. The precise definition of the term varies widely, though a common threshold is approximately 45 kilograms (99 lb), this lower end being centered on humans, with other thresholds being more relative to the sizes of animals in an ecosystem. The spectrum of lower-end thresholds ranges from 10 kilograms (22 lb) to 1,000 kilograms (2,200 lb), the latter largely restricted to megaherbivores. Large body size is generally associated with other traits, such as having a slow rate of reproduction and, in large herbivores, reduced or negligible adult mortality from predation.

Megafauna species have considerable effects on their local environment, including the suppression of the growth of woody vegetation and a consequent reduction in wildfire frequency. Megafauna also play a role in regulating and stabilizing the abundance of smaller animals.

During the Pleistocene, megafauna were diverse across the globe, with most continental ecosystems exhibiting similar or greater species richness in megafauna as compared to ecosystems in Africa today. During the Late Pleistocene, particularly from around 50,000 years ago onwards, most large mammal species became extinct, including 80% of all mammals greater than 1,000 kilograms (2,200 lb), while small animals were largely unaffected. This pronouncedly size-biased extinction is otherwise unprecedented in the geological record. Humans and climatic change have been implicated by most authors as the likely causes, though the relative importance of either factor has been the subject of significant controversy.

== Terminology ==
One of the earliest occurrences of the term "megafauna" is Alfred Russel Wallace's 1876 work The geographical distribution of animals. He described the animals as "the hugest, and fiercest, and strangest forms". In the 20th and 21st centuries, the term usually refers to large animals. There are variations in thresholds used to define megafauna as a whole or certain groups of megafauna. Many scientific literature adopt Paul S. Martin's proposed threshold of 45 kilograms (99 lb) to classify animals as megafauna. However, for freshwater species, 30 kilograms (66 lb) is the preferred threshold. Some scientists define herbivorous terrestrial megafauna as having a weight exceeding 100 kilograms (220 lb), and terrestrial carnivorous megafauna as more than 15 kilograms (33 lb). Additionally, Owen-Smith coined the term megaherbivore to describe herbivores that weighed over 1,000 kilograms (2,200 lb), which has seen some use by other researchers.

Among living animals, the term megafauna is most commonly used for the largest extant terrestrial mammals, which include (but are not limited to) elephants, giraffes, hippopotamuses, rhinoceroses, and larger bovines. Of these five categories of large herbivores, only bovines are presently found outside of Africa and Asia, but all the others were formerly more wide-ranging, with their ranges and populations continually shrinking and decreasing over time. Wild equines are another example of megafauna, but their current ranges are largely restricted to the Old World, specifically in Africa and Asia. Megafaunal species may be categorized according to their dietary type: megaherbivores (e.g., elephants), megacarnivores (e.g., lions), and megaomnivores (e.g., bears).

== Definition ==
Since the term "megafauna" was first proposed, the scientific community has not settled on a single, succinct definition. However, recent scholarship has been in support of ecological definitions. A 2020 study in Proceedings of the Royal Society B: Biological Sciences analyzed 276 pieces of literature to categorize the different uses of the term. The study determined two typical uses: "keystone megafauna" and "functional megafauna," with a subcategory of "apex megafauna." Subsequently, these categories reflected how the term has evolved amongst the academic scientific community. Despite each of these attempts at categorization, there remains no set standard, as definitions vary based on specific habitats, groups being studied and context.

=== Keystone megafauna ===
First defined by Robert T. Paine in 1969, a keystone species is a population whose activity meets a disproportional amount of needs that other species in a habitat depend on. Their function is further illustrated by the effects of their absence. Losing these species can cause natural ecological processes to unravel, leading to further environmental decline. Keystone megafauna's larger mass and range is significant to such roles they play in their ecosystems. Distinguishing a keystone megafauna from the other categories depends on the individual species' size and their implications for the function of the habitat. Although small species can also function as keystones, they do not meet the sizing criteria of megafauna.

=== Functional megafauna ===
Functional megafauna refers to the species that are currently seen as the largest in their taxonomical group and that tend to have identifiable advantages in their habitat due to their size. The term "functional" in this case refers to the traits that contribute to the ability allowing these species to use their size. The actual mass minimum with this definition will vary between the individuals SPECIFY classification, like how herbivores typically reach around 1000 kg to be considered whereas carnivores need only be around 13–16 kg. Apex megafauna is an additional term to be used for these species within this category.

==== Apex megafauna ====
"Apex" is a term usually used to describe apex predators. Apex predators are carnivorous species who dominate the habitat they reside in, being at the top of the food chain and having large hunting ranges. The difference for these megafauna species, humans for example, lies in their unlikeliness to become prey which increases significantly into adulthood, whether it is because of predation status or their size. Large animals that are not predators can fit into this apex ideation because, similarly, their range is more influenced by the capacity of the habitat rather than the typical phenomenon of being hunted for population control.

== Ecological strategy ==
Megafauna tend to display the ecological role of K-strategists, with high longevity, slow population growth rates, low mortality rates, and (at least for the largest) few or no natural predators capable of killing adults. These characteristics, although not exclusive to such megafauna, make them vulnerable to human overexploitation, in part because of their slow population recovery rates.

Megafauna are considerable contributors to the environments they populate in. The lasting effects of megafauna have been studied, such as Enquist's paper that considered the results from notable megafauna extinction events. During the Anthropocene, many larger species declined in populations (flora and fauna both), which was found to have profound downward effects on the total biosphere activity. This can be attributed to losing these species that assist in many natural processes, like creating new soil, cycling carbon, and population control of the other species. According to simulations and studies done based on current global conditions, removing megafauna from a habitat would leave niches to be filled by smaller plants and animals, upsetting the stable chain of systems that is currently functioning.

== Evolution of large body size ==
One observation that has been made about the evolution of larger body size is that rapid rates of increase that are often seen over relatively short time intervals are not sustainable over much longer time periods. In an examination of mammal body mass changes over time, the maximum increase possible in a given time interval was found to scale with the interval length raised to the 0.25 power. This is thought to reflect the emergence, during a trend of increasing maximum body size, of a series of anatomical, physiological, environmental, genetic and other constraints that must be overcome by evolutionary innovations before further size increases are possible. A strikingly faster rate of change was found for large decreases in body mass, such as may be associated with the phenomenon of insular dwarfism. When normalized to generation length, the maximum rate of body mass decrease was found to be over 30 times greater than the maximum rate of body mass increase for a ten-fold change.

=== In terrestrial mammals ===
Large terrestrial mammals compared in size to one of the largest sauropod dinosaurs, Patagotitan

Subsequent to the Cretaceous–Paleogene extinction event that eliminated the non-avian dinosaurs about 66 Ma (million years) ago, terrestrial mammals underwent a nearly exponential increase in body size as they diversified to occupy the ecological niches left vacant. Starting from just a few kg before the event, maximum size had reached ~50 kilograms (110 lb) a few million years later, and ~750 kilograms (1,650 lb) by the end of the Paleocene. This trend of increasing body mass appears to level off about 40 Ma ago (in the late Eocene), suggesting that physiological or ecological constraints had been reached, after an increase in body mass of over three orders of magnitude. However, when considered from the standpoint of rate of size increase per generation, the exponential increase is found to have continued until the appearance of Indricotherium 30 Ma ago. (Since generation time scales with body mass^{0.259}, increasing generation times with increasing size cause the log mass vs. time plot to curve downward from a linear fit.)

Megaherbivores eventually attained a body mass of over 10,000 kilograms (22,000 lb). The largest of these, indricotheres and proboscids, have been hindgut fermenters, which are believed to have an advantage over foregut fermenters in terms of being able to accelerate gastrointestinal transit in order to accommodate very large food intakes. A similar trend emerges when rates of increase of maximum body mass per generation for different mammalian clades are compared (using rates averaged over macroevolutionary time scales). Among terrestrial mammals, the fastest rates of increase of body mass^{0.259} vs. time (in Ma) occurred in perissodactyls (a slope of 2.1), followed by rodents (1.2) and proboscids (1.1), all of which are hindgut fermenters. The rate of increase for artiodactyls (0.74) was about a third of the perissodactyls. The rate for carnivorans (0.65) was slightly lower yet, while primates, perhaps constrained by their arboreal habits, had the lowest rate (0.39) among the mammalian groups studied.

Terrestrial mammalian carnivores from several eutherian groups (the artiodactyl Andrewsarchus – formerly considered a mesonychid, the oxyaenid Sarkastodon, and the carnivorans Amphicyon and Arctodus) all reached a maximum size of about 1,000 kilograms (2,200 lb) (the carnivoran Arctotherium and the hyaenodontid Simbakubwa may have been somewhat larger). The largest known metatherian carnivore, Proborhyaena gigantea, apparently reached 600 kilograms (1,300 lb), also close to this limit. A similar theoretical maximum size for mammalian carnivores has been predicted based on the metabolic rate of mammals, the energetic cost of obtaining prey, and the maximum estimated rate coefficient of prey intake. It has also been suggested that maximum size for mammalian carnivores is constrained by the stress the humerus can withstand at top running speed.

Analysis of the variation of maximum body size over the last 40 Ma suggests that decreasing temperature and increasing continental land area are associated with increasing maximum body size. The former correlation would be consistent with Bergmann's rule, and might be related to the thermoregulatory advantage of large body mass in cool climates, better ability of larger organisms to cope with seasonality in food supply, or other factors; the latter correlation could be explained in terms of range and resource limitations. However, the two parameters are interrelated (due to sea level drops accompanying increased glaciation), making the driver of the trends in maximum size more difficult to identify.

=== In marine mammals ===
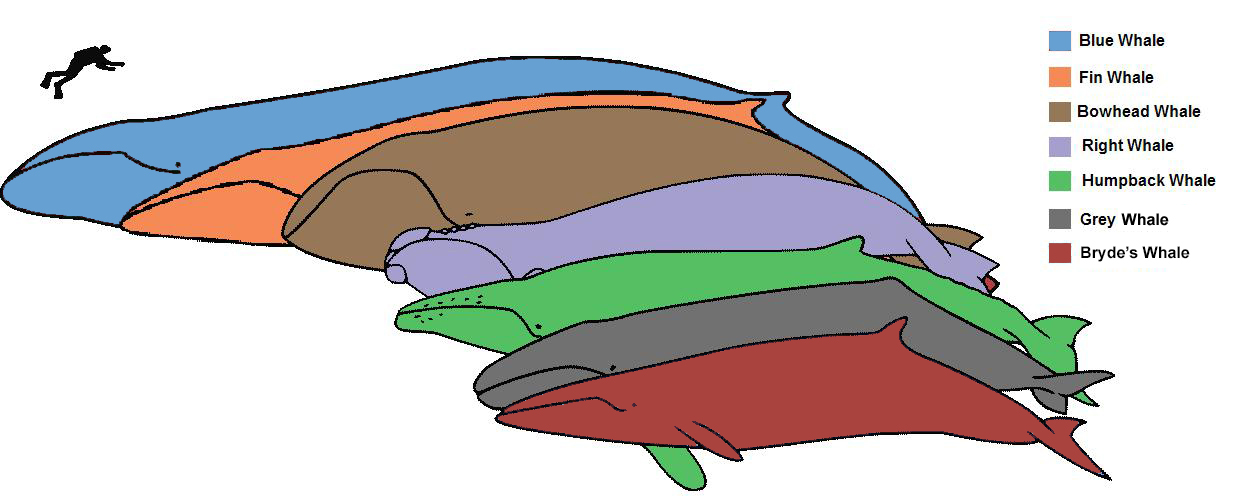
Baleen whale comparative sizes

Since tetrapods (first reptiles, later mammals) returned to the sea in the Late Permian, they have dominated the top end of the marine body size range, due to the more efficient intake of oxygen possible using lungs. The ancestors of cetaceans are believed to have been the semiaquatic pakicetids, no larger than dogs, of about 53 million years (Ma) ago. By 40 Ma ago, cetaceans had attained a length of 20 m (66 ft) or more in Basilosaurus, an elongated, serpentine whale that differed from modern whales in many respects and was not ancestral to them. Following this, the evolution of large body size in cetaceans appears to have come to a temporary halt and then to have backtracked, although the available fossil records are limited. However, in the period from 31 Ma ago (in the Oligocene) to the present, cetaceans underwent a significantly more rapid sustained increase in body mass (a rate of increase in body mass^{0.259} of a factor of 3.2 per million years) than achieved by any group of terrestrial mammals. This trend led to the largest animal of all time, the modern blue whale. Several reasons for the more rapid evolution of large body size in cetaceans are possible. Fewer biomechanical constraints on increases in body size may be associated with suspension in water as opposed to standing against the force of gravity, and with swimming movements as opposed to terrestrial locomotion. Also, the greater heat capacity and thermal conductivity of water compared to air may increase the thermoregulatory advantage of large body size in marine endotherms, although diminishing returns apply.

Among the toothed whales, maximum body size appears to be limited by food availability. Larger size, as in sperm and beaked whales, facilitates deeper diving to access relatively easily-caught, large cephalopod prey in a less competitive environment. Compared to odontocetes, the efficiency of baleen whales' filter feeding scales more favorably with increasing size when planktonic food is dense, making larger sizes more advantageous. The lunge feeding technique of rorquals appears to be more energy efficient than the ram feeding of balaenid whales; the latter technique is used with less dense and patchy plankton. The cooling trend in Earth's recent history may have generated more localities of high plankton abundance via wind-driven upwellings, facilitating the evolution of gigantic whales.

Cetaceans are not the only marine mammals to reach tremendous sizes. The largest mammal carnivorans of all time are marine pinnipeds, the largest of which is the southern elephant seal, which can reach more than 6 m (20 ft) in length and weigh up to 5,000 kg (11,000 lb). Other large pinnipeds include the northern elephant seal at 4,000 kg (8,800 lb), walrus at 2,000 kg (4,400 lb), and Steller sea lion at 1,135 kg (2,502 lb). The sirenians are another group of marine mammals which adapted to fully aquatic life around the same time as the cetaceans did. Sirenians are closely related to elephants. The largest sirenian was the Steller's sea cow, which reached up to 10 m (33 ft) in length and weighed 8,000 to 10,000 kg (18,000 to 22,000 lb), and was hunted to extinction in the 18th century.

=== In flightless birds ===
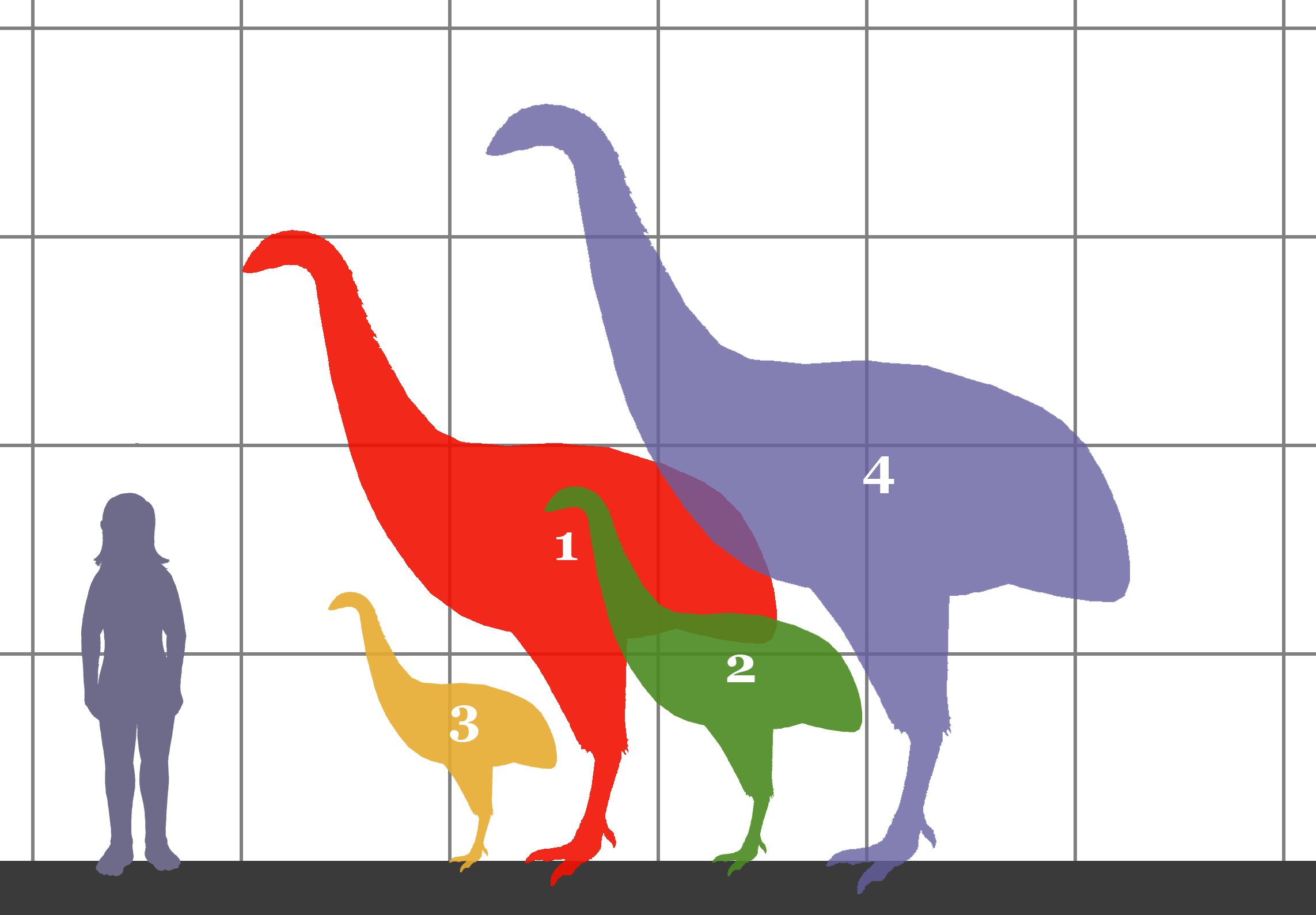
A size comparison between a human and 4 moa species: 1. Dinornis novaezealandiae; 2. Emeus crassus; 3. Anomalopteryx didiformis; 4. Dinornis robustus

Because of the small initial size of all mammals following the extinction of the non-avian dinosaurs, nonmammalian vertebrates had a roughly ten-million-year-long window of opportunity (during the Paleocene) for evolution of gigantism without much competition. During this interval, apex predator niches were often occupied by reptiles, such as terrestrial crocodilians (e.g. Pristichampsus), large snakes (e.g. Titanoboa) or varanid lizards, or by flightless birds (e.g. Paleopsilopterus in South America). This is also the period when megafaunal flightless herbivorous gastornithid birds evolved in the Northern Hemisphere, while flightless paleognaths evolved to large size on Gondwanan land masses and Europe. Gastornithids and at least one lineage of flightless paleognath birds originated in Europe, both lineages dominating niches for large herbivores while mammals remained below 45 kilograms (99 lb) (in contrast with other landmasses like North America and Asia, which saw the earlier evolution of larger mammals) and were the largest European tetrapods in the Paleocene.

Flightless paleognaths, termed ratites, have traditionally been viewed as representing a lineage separate from that of their small flighted relatives, the Neotropic tinamous. However, recent genetic studies have found that tinamous nest well within the ratite tree, and are the sister group of the extinct moa of New Zealand. Similarly, the small kiwi of New Zealand have been found to be the sister group of the extinct elephant birds of Madagascar. These findings indicate that flightlessness and gigantism arose independently multiple times among ratites via parallel evolution.

Predatory megafaunal flightless birds were often able to compete with mammals in the early Cenozoic. Later in the Cenozoic, however, they were displaced by advanced carnivorans and died out. In North America, the bathornithids Paracrax and Bathornis were apex predators but became extinct by the Early Miocene. In South America, the related phorusrhacids shared the dominant predatory niches with metatherian sparassodonts during most of the Cenozoic but declined and ultimately went extinct after eutherian predators arrived from North America (as part of the Great American Interchange) during the Pliocene. In contrast, large herbivorous flightless ratites have survived to the present.

However, none of the flightless birds of the Cenozoic, including the predatory Brontornis, possibly omnivorous Dromornis stirtoni or herbivorous Aepyornis, ever grew to masses much above 500 kilograms (1,100 lb); thus, they never attained the size of the largest mammalian carnivores, let alone that of the largest mammalian herbivores. It has been suggested that the increasing thickness of avian eggshells in proportion to egg mass with increasing egg size places an upper limit on the size of birds. (Note: Nonavian dinosaur size was not similarly constrained because they had a different relationship between body mass and egg size than birds. The 400 kilograms (880 lb) Aepyornis had larger eggs than nearly all dinosaurs.) The largest species of Dromornis, D. stirtoni, may have gone extinct after it attained the maximum avian body mass and was then outcompeted by marsupial diprotodonts that evolved to sizes several times larger.

=== In giant turtles ===
Giant tortoises were important components of late Cenozoic megafaunas, being present in every nonpolar continent until the arrival of homininans. The largest known terrestrial tortoise was Megalochelys atlas, an animal that probably weighed about 1,000 kg (2,200 lb).

Some earlier aquatic Testudines, e.g. the marine Archelon of the Cretaceous and freshwater Stupendemys of the Miocene, were considerably larger, weighing more than 2,000 kg (4,400 lb).

== Megafaunal mass extinctions ==
=== Timing and possible causes ===
Correlations between times of first appearance of humans and unique megafaunal extinction pulses on different land masses

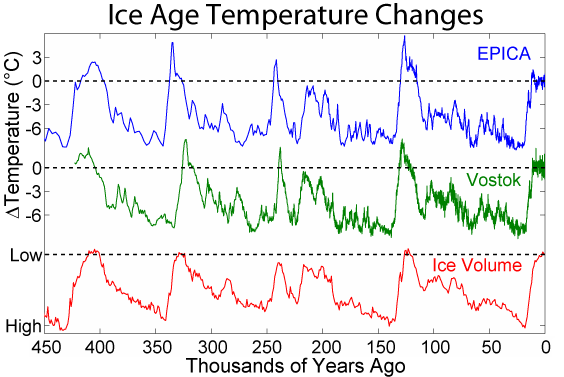
Cyclical pattern of global climate change over the last 450,000 years (based on Antarctic temperatures and global ice volume), showing that there were no unique climatic events that would account for any of the megafaunal extinction pulses

Numerous extinctions occurred during the latter half of the Last Glacial Period when most large mammals went extinct in the Americas, Australia-New Guinea, and Eurasia, including over 80% of all terrestrial animals with a body mass greater than 1,000 kilograms (2,200 lb). Small animals and other organisms like plants were generally unaffected by the extinctions, which is unprecented in previous extinctions during the last 30 million years.

Various theories have attributed the wave of extinctions to human hunting, climate change, disease, extraterrestrial impact, competition from other animals or other causes. However, this extinction near the end of the Pleistocene was just one of a series of megafaunal extinction pulses that have occurred during the last 50,000 years over much of the Earth's surface, with Africa and Asia (where the local megafauna had a chance to evolve alongside modern humans) being comparatively less affected. The latter areas did suffer gradual attrition of megafauna, particularly of the slower-moving species (a class of vulnerable megafauna epitomized by giant tortoises), over the last several million years.

Outside the mainland of Afro-Eurasia, these megafaunal extinctions followed a highly distinctive landmass-by-landmass pattern that closely parallels the spread of humans into previously uninhabited regions of the world, and which shows no overall correlation with climatic history (which can be visualized with plots over recent geological time periods of climate markers such as marine oxygen isotopes or atmospheric carbon dioxide levels). Australia and nearby islands (e.g., Flores) were struck first around 46,000 years ago, followed by Tasmania about 41,000 years ago (after formation of a land bridge to Australia about 43,000 years ago). The role of humans in the extinction of Australia and New Guinea's megafauna has been disputed, with multiple studies showing a decline in the number of species prior to the arrival of humans on the continent and the absence of any evidence of human predation; the impact of climate change has instead been cited for their decline. Similarly, Japan lost most of its megafauna apparently about 30,000 years ago, North America 13,000 years ago (Note: Analysis indicates that 35 genera of North American mammals went extinct more or less simultaneously in this event.) and South America about 500 years later, Cyprus 10,000 years ago, the Antilles 6,000 years ago, New Caledonia and nearby islands 3,000 years ago, Madagascar 2,000 years ago, New Zealand 700 years ago, the Mascarenes 400 years ago, and the Commander Islands 250 years ago. Nearly all of the world's isolated islands could furnish similar examples of extinctions occurring shortly after the arrival of humans, though most of these islands, such as the Hawaiian Islands, never had terrestrial megafauna, so their extinct fauna were smaller, but still displayed island gigantism.

An analysis of the timing of Holarctic megafaunal extinctions and extirpations over the last 56,000 years has revealed a tendency for such events to cluster within interstadials, periods of abrupt warming, but only when humans were also present. Humans may have impeded processes of migration and recolonization that would otherwise have allowed the megafaunal species to adapt to the climate shift. In at least some areas, interstadials were periods of expanding human populations.

An analysis of Sporormiella fungal spores (which derive mainly from the dung of megaherbivores) in swamp sediment cores spanning the last 130,000 years from Lynch's Crater in Queensland, Australia, showed that the megafauna of that region virtually disappeared about 41,000 years ago, at a time when climate changes were minimal; the change was accompanied by an increase in charcoal, and was followed by a transition from rainforest to fire-tolerant sclerophyll vegetation. The high-resolution chronology of the changes supports the hypothesis that human hunting alone eliminated the megafauna, and that the subsequent change in flora was most likely a consequence of the elimination of browsers and an increase in fire. The increase in fire lagged the disappearance of megafauna by about a century, and most likely resulted from accumulation of fuel once browsing stopped. Over the next several centuries grass increased; sclerophyll vegetation increased with a lag of another century, and a sclerophyll forest developed after about another thousand years. During two periods of climate change about 120,000 and 75,000 years ago, sclerophyll vegetation had also increased at the site in response to a shift to cooler, drier conditions; neither of these episodes had a significant impact on megafaunal abundance. Similar conclusions regarding the culpability of human hunters in the disappearance of Pleistocene megafauna were derived from high-resolution chronologies obtained via an analysis of a large collection of eggshell fragments of the flightless Australian bird Genyornis newtoni, from analysis of Sporormiella fungal spores from a lake in eastern North America and from study of deposits of Shasta ground sloth dung left in over half a dozen caves in the American Southwest.

Continuing human hunting and environmental disturbance has led to additional megafaunal extinctions in the recent past, and has created a serious danger of further extinctions in the near future (see examples below). Direct killing by humans, primarily for meat or other body parts, is the most significant factor in contemporary megafaunal decline.

A number of other mass extinctions occurred earlier in Earth's geologic history, in which some or all of the megafauna of the time also died out. Famously, in the Cretaceous–Paleogene extinction event, the non-avian dinosaurs and most other giant reptiles were eliminated. However, the earlier mass extinctions were more global and not so selective for megafauna; i.e., many species of other types, including plants, marine invertebrates and plankton, went extinct as well. Thus, the earlier events must have been caused by more generalized types of disturbances to the biosphere.

=== Consequences of depletion of megafauna ===
Depletion of herbivorous megafauna results in increased growth of woody vegetation, and a consequent increase in wildfire frequency. Megafauna may help to suppress the growth of invasive plants. Large herbivores and carnivores can suppress the abundance of smaller animals, resulting in their population increase when megafauna are removed.

==== Effect on nutrient transport ====
Megafauna play a significant role in the lateral transport of mineral nutrients in an ecosystem, tending to translocate them from areas of high to those of lower abundance. They do so by their movement between the time they consume the nutrient and the time they release it through elimination (or, to a much lesser extent, through decomposition after death). In South America's Amazon Basin, it is estimated that such lateral diffusion was reduced over 98% following the megafaunal extinctions that occurred roughly 12,500 years ago. Given that phosphorus availability is thought to limit productivity in much of the region, the decrease in its transport from the western part of the basin and from floodplains (both of which derive their supply from the uplift of the Andes) to other areas is thought to have significantly impacted the region's ecology, and the effects may not yet have reached their limits. In the sea, cetaceans and pinnipeds that feed at depth are thought to translocate nitrogen from deep to shallow water, enhancing ocean productivity, and counteracting the activity of zooplankton, which tend to do the opposite.

==== Effect on methane emissions ====
Large populations of megaherbivores have the potential to contribute greatly to the atmospheric concentration of methane, which is an important greenhouse gas. Modern ruminant herbivores produce methane as a byproduct of foregut fermentation in digestion and release it through belching or flatulence. Today, around 20% of annual methane emissions come from livestock methane release. In the Mesozoic, it has been estimated that sauropods could have emitted 520 million tons of methane to the atmosphere annually, contributing to the warmer climate of the time (up to 10 °C (18 °F) warmer than at present). This large emission follows from the enormous estimated biomass of sauropods, and because methane production of individual herbivores is believed to be almost proportional to their mass.

Recent studies have indicated that the extinction of megafaunal herbivores may have caused a reduction in atmospheric methane. This hypothesis is relatively new. One study examined the methane emissions from the bison that occupied the Great Plains of North America before contact with European settlers. The study estimated that the removal of the bison caused a decrease of as much as 2.2 million tons per year. Another study examined the change in the methane concentration in the atmosphere at the end of the Pleistocene epoch after the extinction of megafauna in the Americas. After early humans migrated to the Americas about 13,000 BP, their hunting and other associated ecological impacts led to the extinction of many megafaunal species there. Calculations suggest that this extinction decreased methane production by about 9.6 million tons per year. This suggests that the absence of megafaunal methane emissions may have contributed to the abrupt climatic cooling at the onset of the Younger Dryas. The decrease in atmospheric methane that occurred at that time, as recorded in ice cores, was 2 to 4 times more rapid than any other decrease in the last half million years, suggesting that an unusual mechanism was at work.

== Current studies ==
Current studies being completed on megafauna species are reflective, and do not tend to offer a set definition of the subject; additionally, some consider there to be a significant lack in cross-disciplinary studies. Many consider megafauna to be increasingly important in the topic of conservation and climate change. Research set on specifically megafauna would increase the understanding of global environments and habitat system interactions.

Enquist's paper on megabiota found that climate change has caused a fast-spreading decrease of large animals. This finding implicates that many of the world's ecosystems are currently experiencing many shifts in their dynamics, losing out on vital activity within their systems. Some scholars have done considerable research into how to restore populations of megafauna in order to reinstate the stability once had in that ecosystem, such as in the case of Madagascar and giant tortoises. In this study, it was found that replacing one extinct megafauna with another that had a similar niche could prevent further extinctions among the islands species. Megaflora also contribute a huge amount to their ecosystems, offering shelter for many species and food for even more, including many megafauna.

== Gallery ==
=== Pleistocene extinct megafauna ===
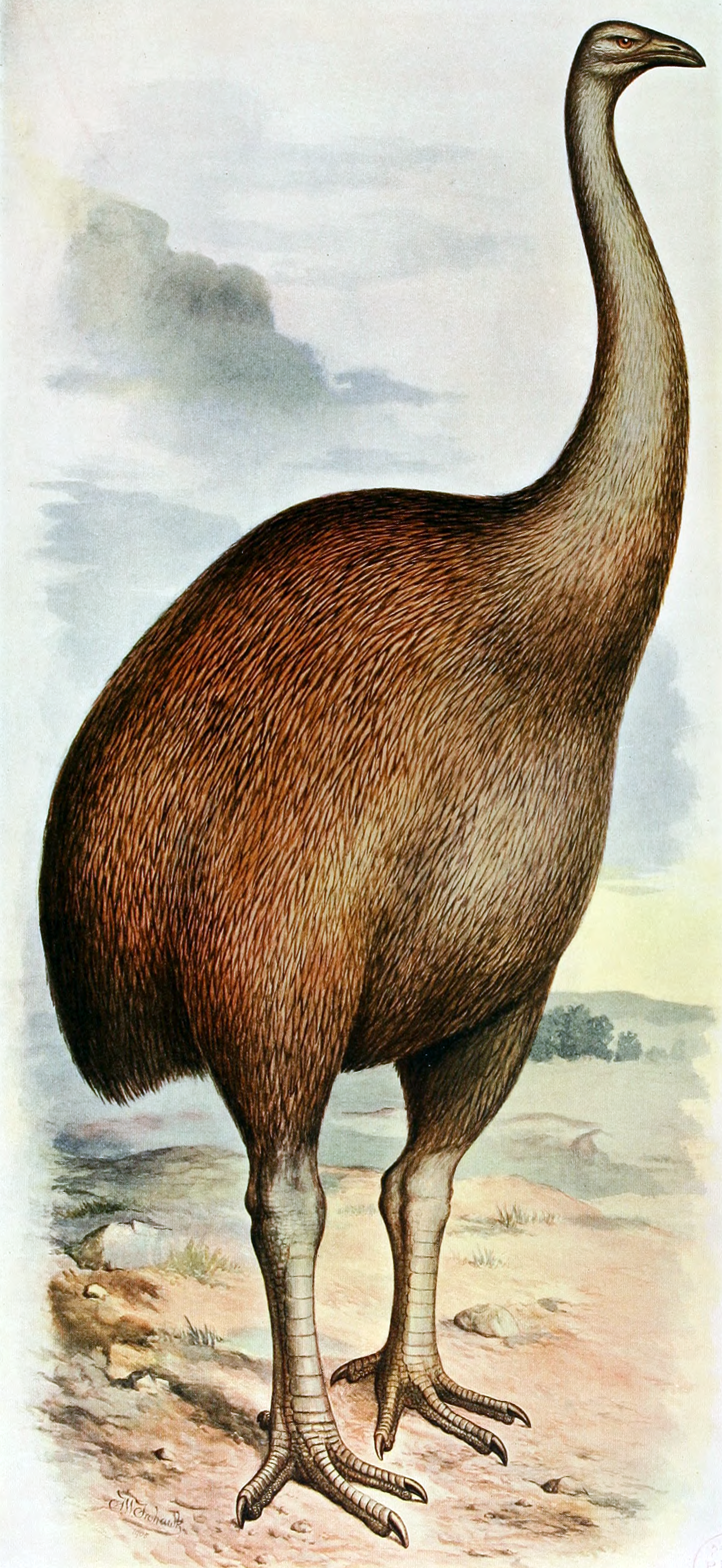
Moa (Dinornis pictured)

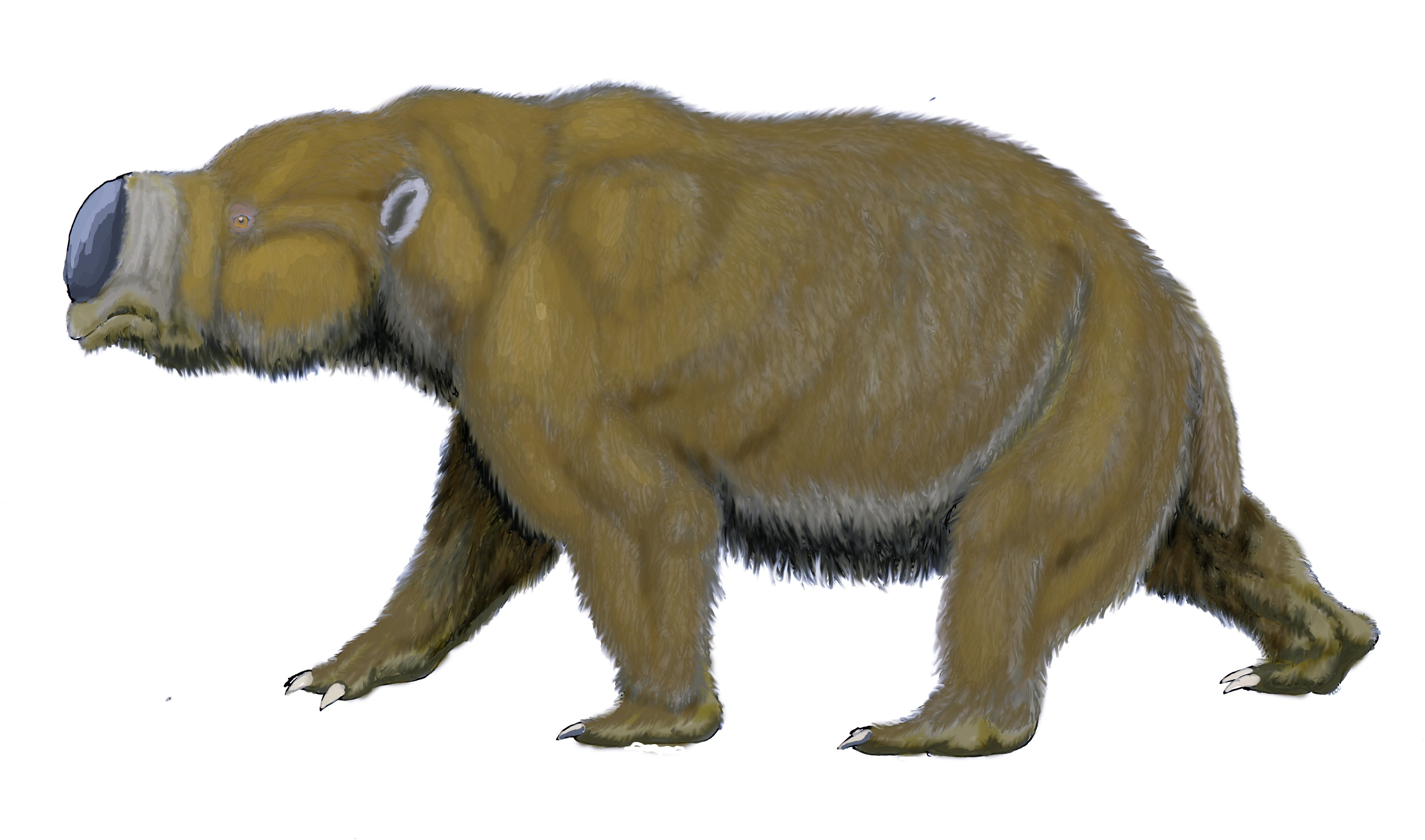
Diprotodon optatum

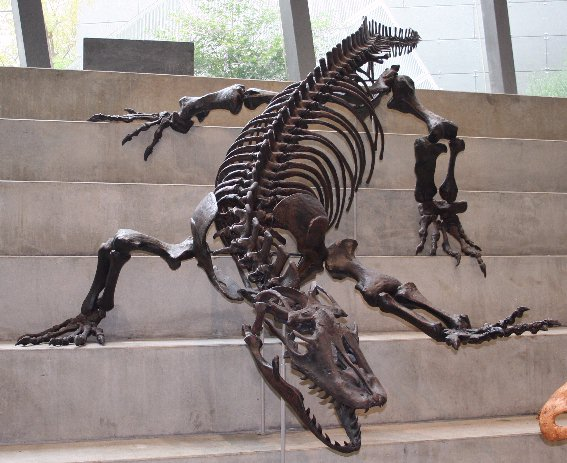
"Megalania" (Varanus priscus)

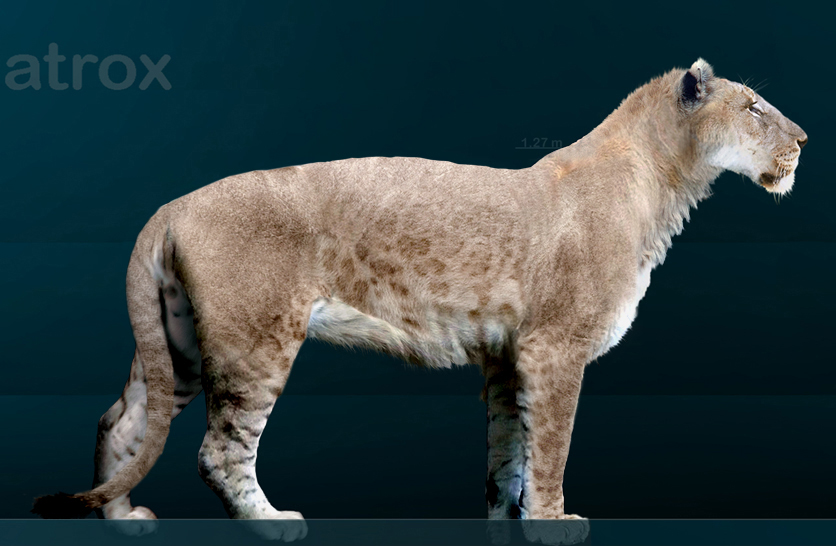
American lions (Panthera atrox)

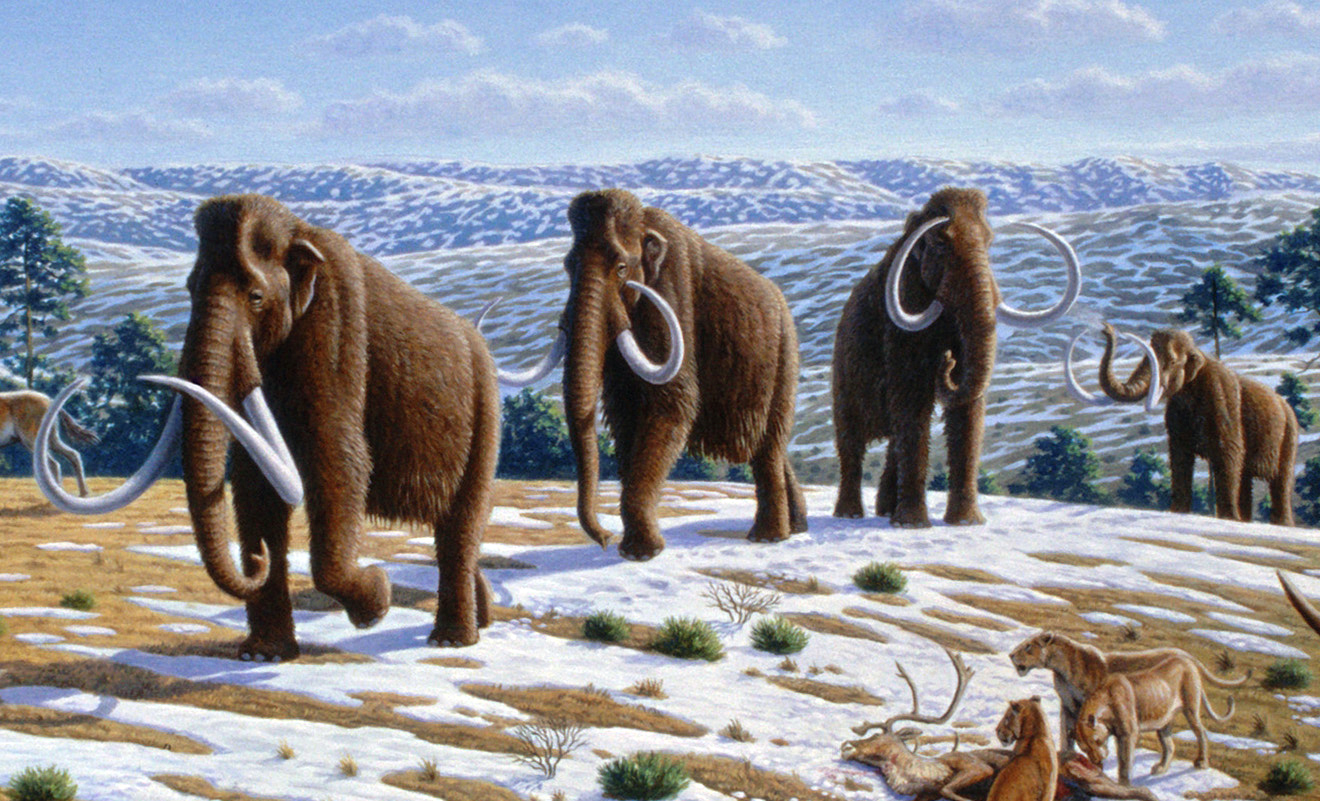
Woolly mammoth

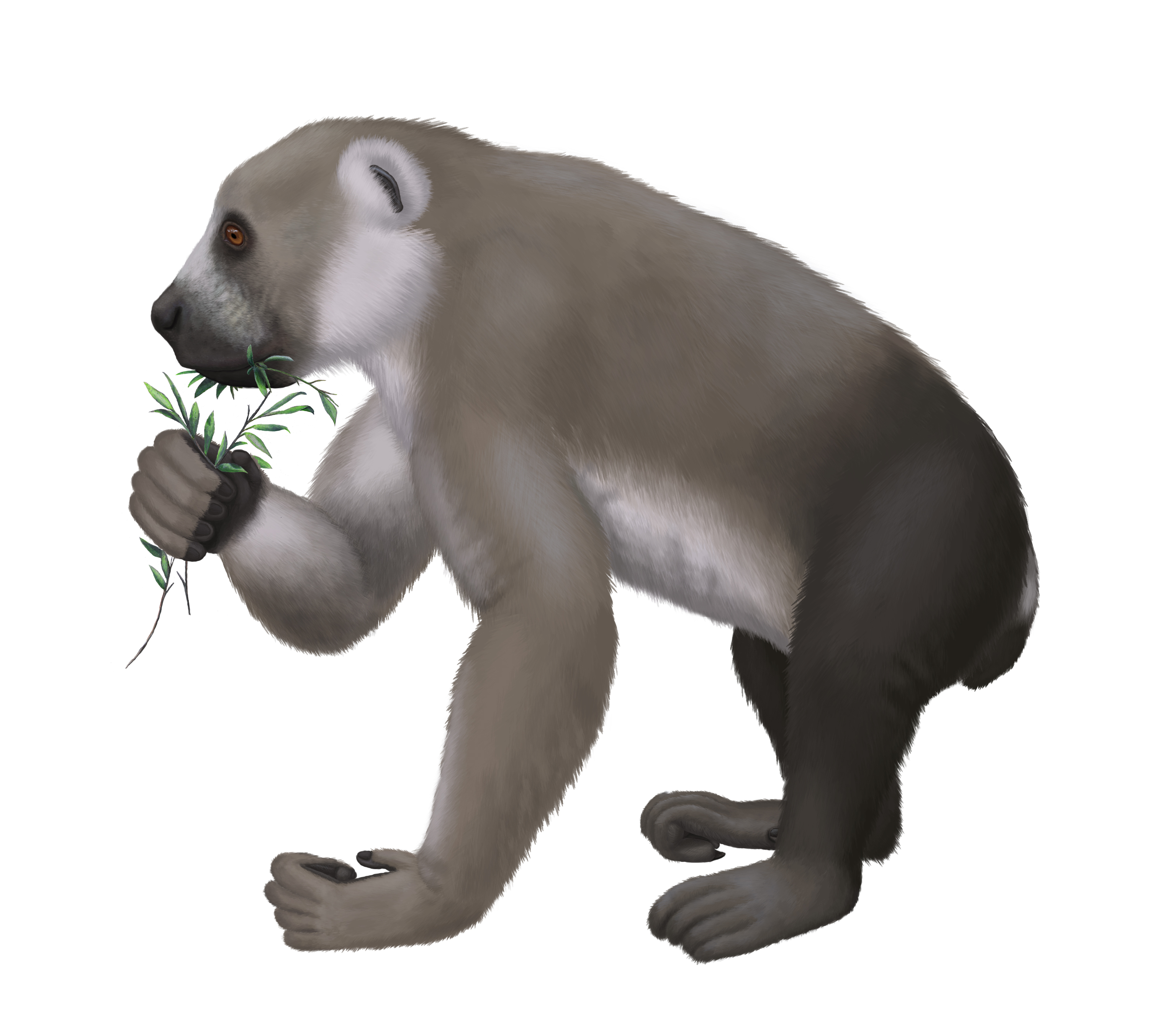
The subfossil lemur Archaeoindris

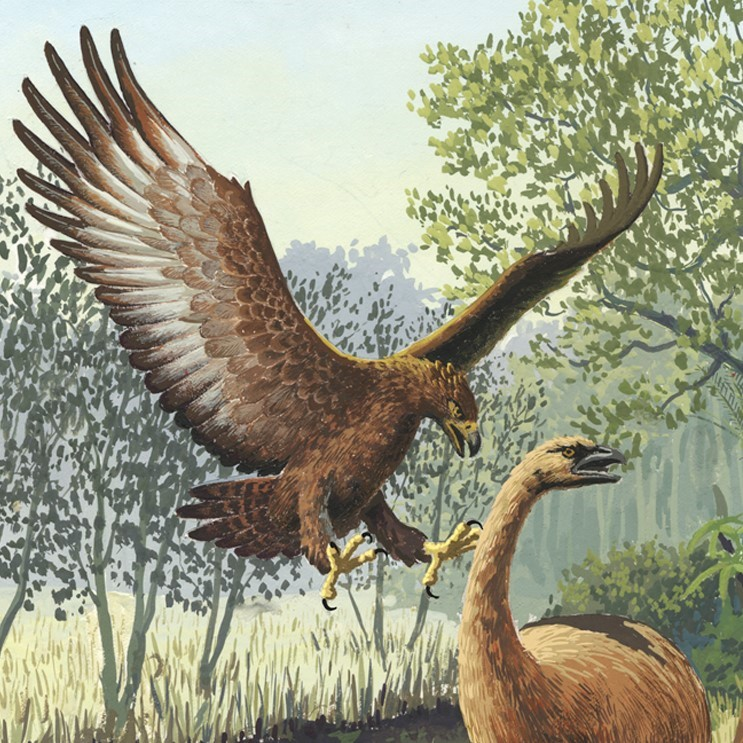
Haast's eagle

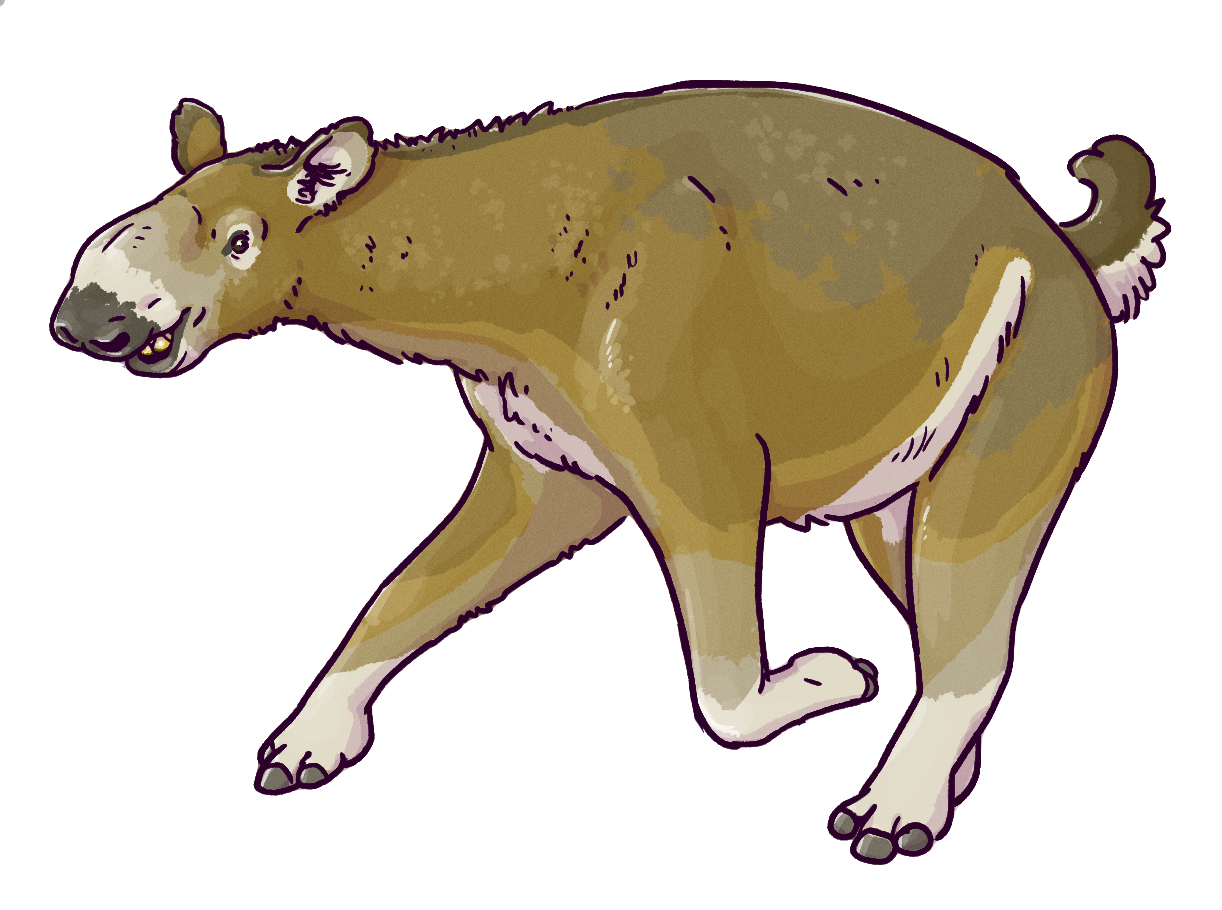
Restoration of Macrauchenia, a camel-sized member of the extinct ungulate order Litopterna

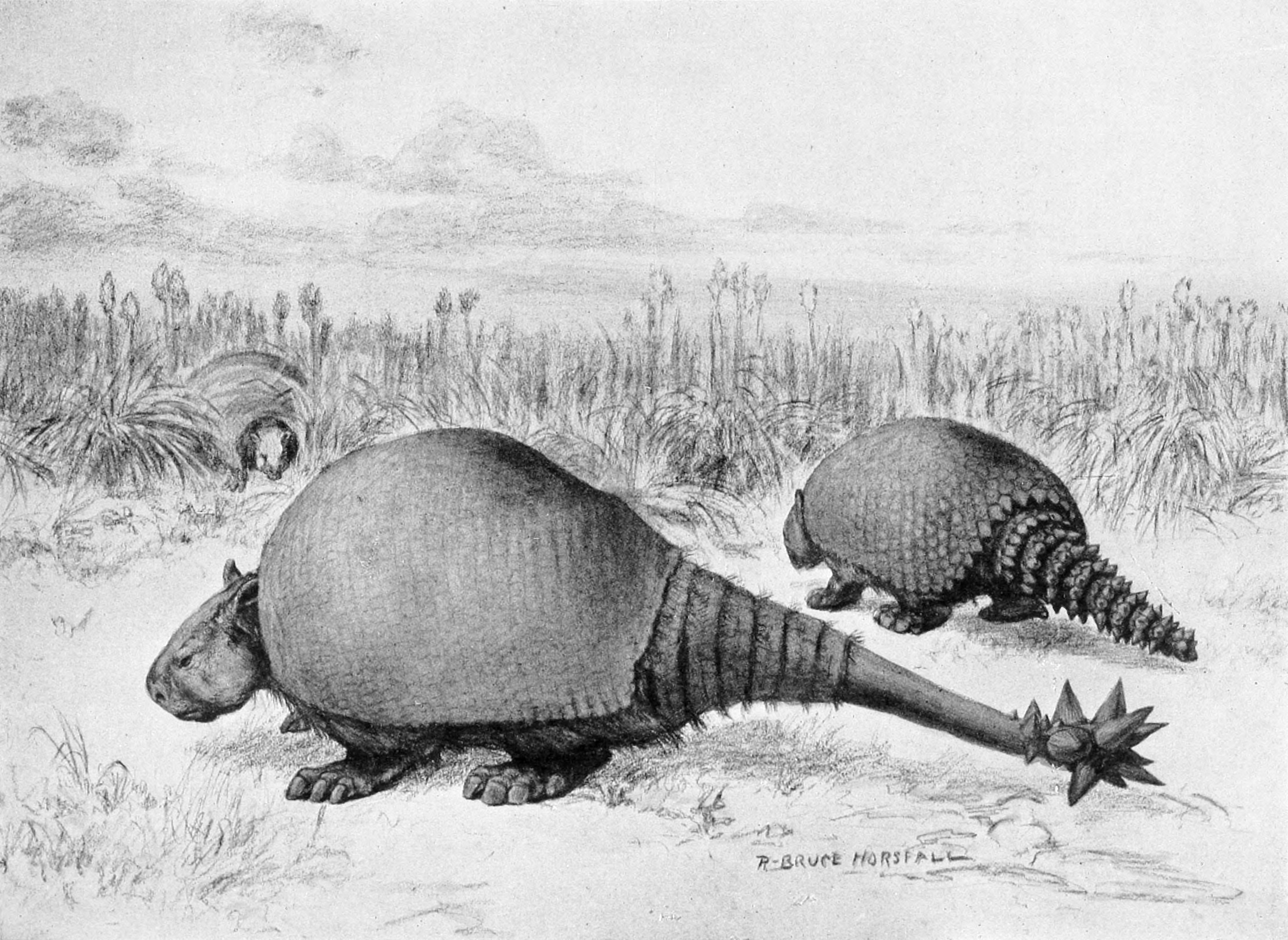
Life restoration of the glyptodonts Doedicurus (front) and Glyptodon

=== Other extinct Cenozoic megafauna ===
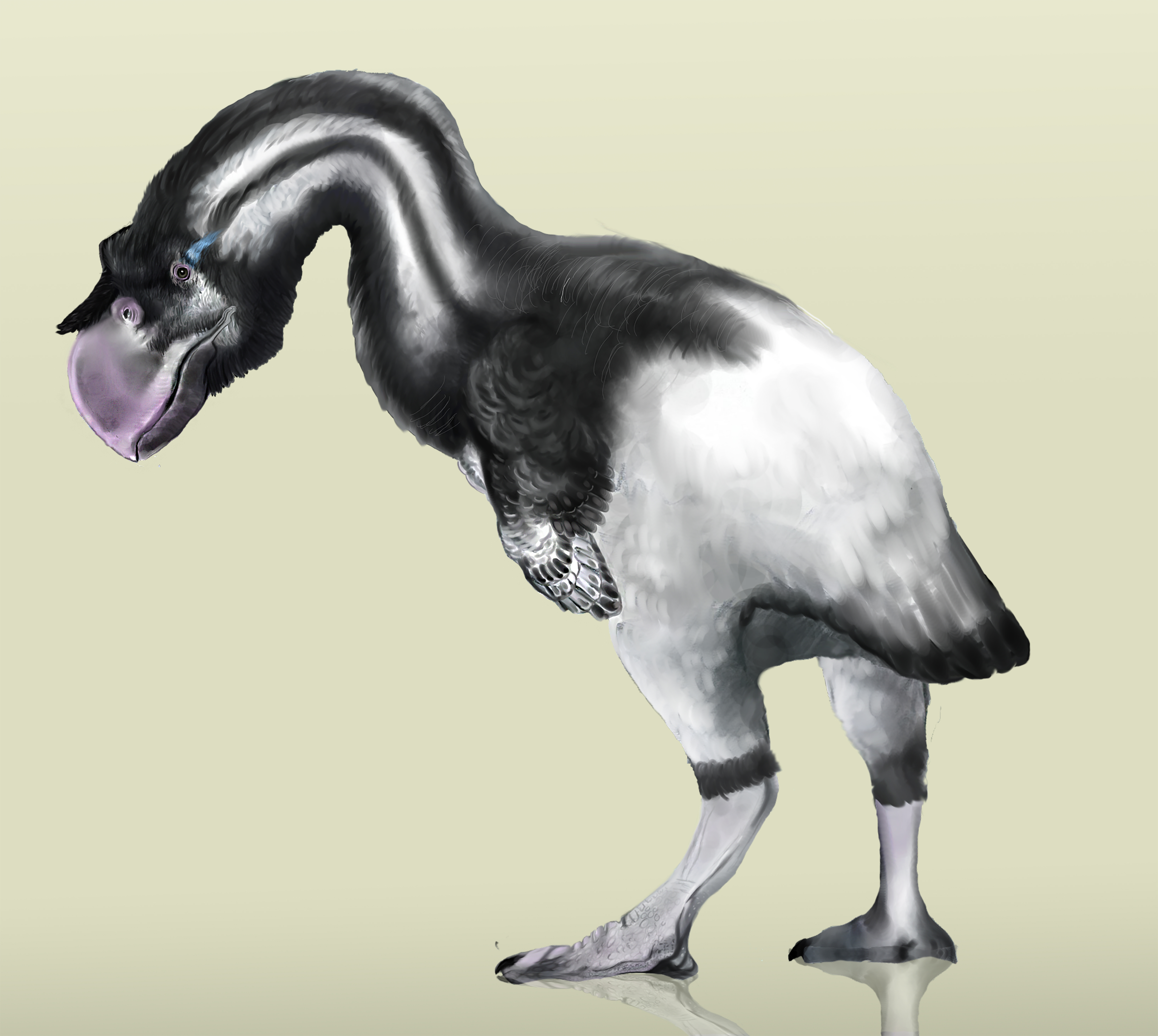
Dromornis stirtoni

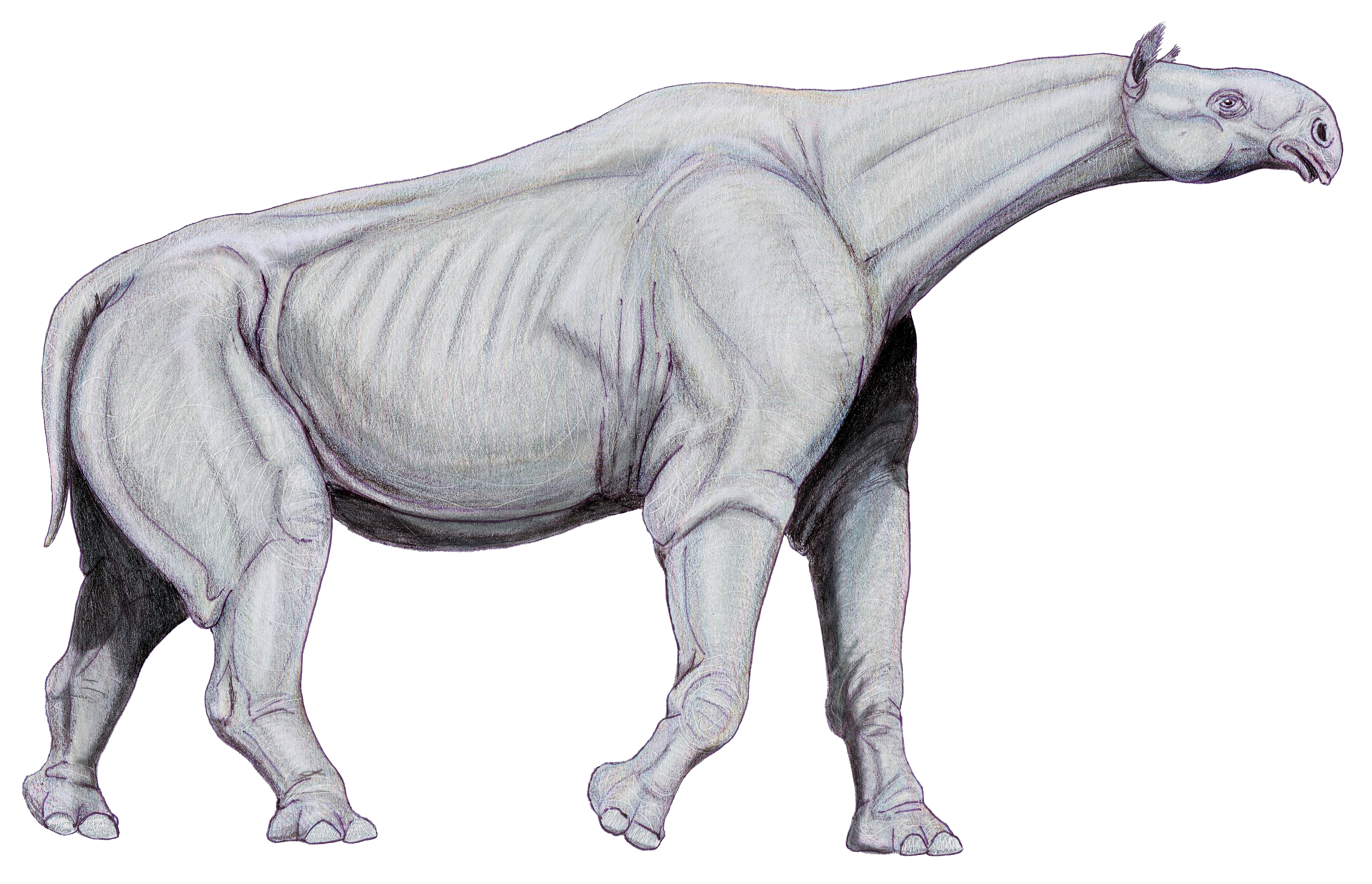
Asian paraceratheriid rhino Paraceratherium was among the largest land mammals

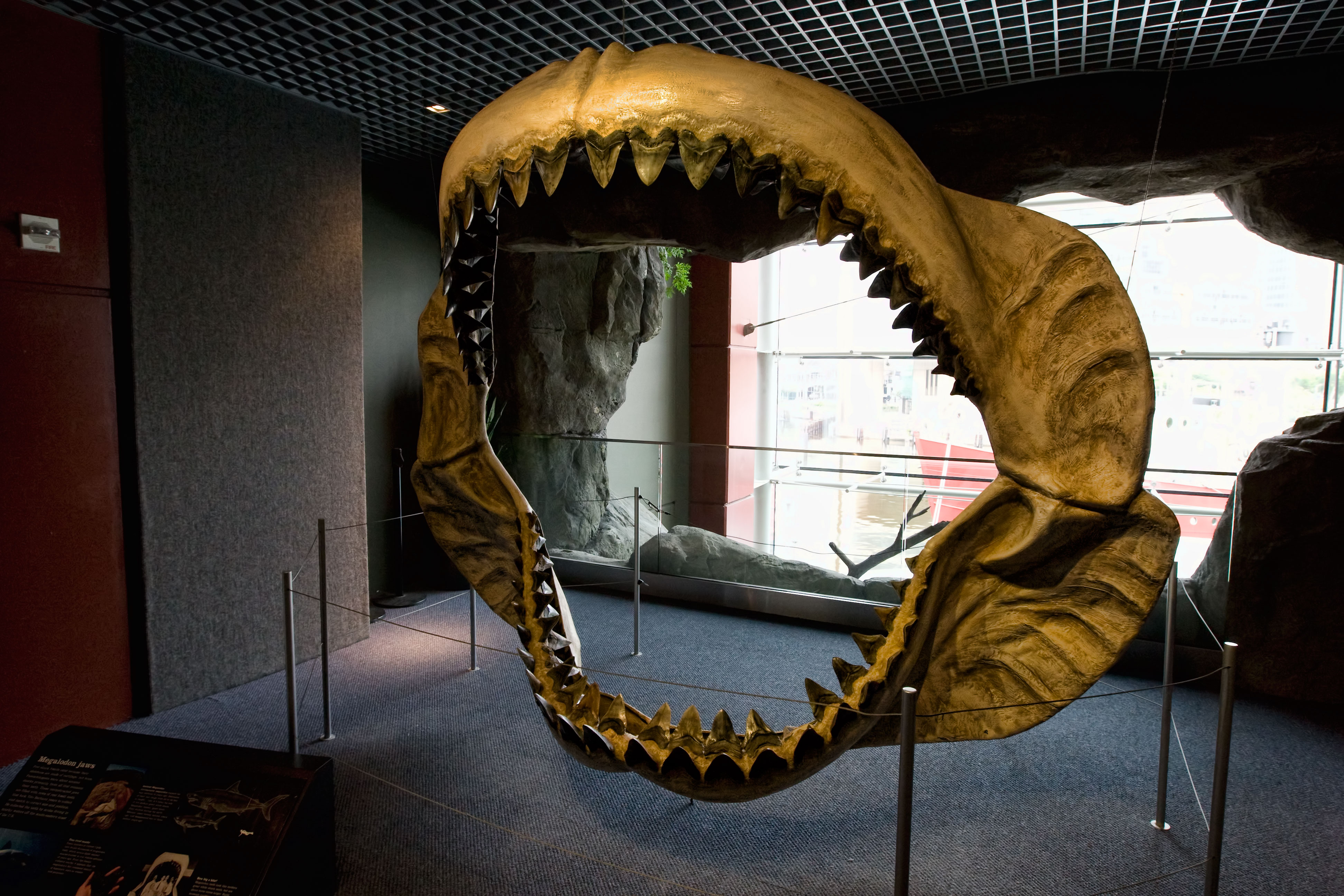
Reconstructed jaws of megalodon (Otodus megalodon)

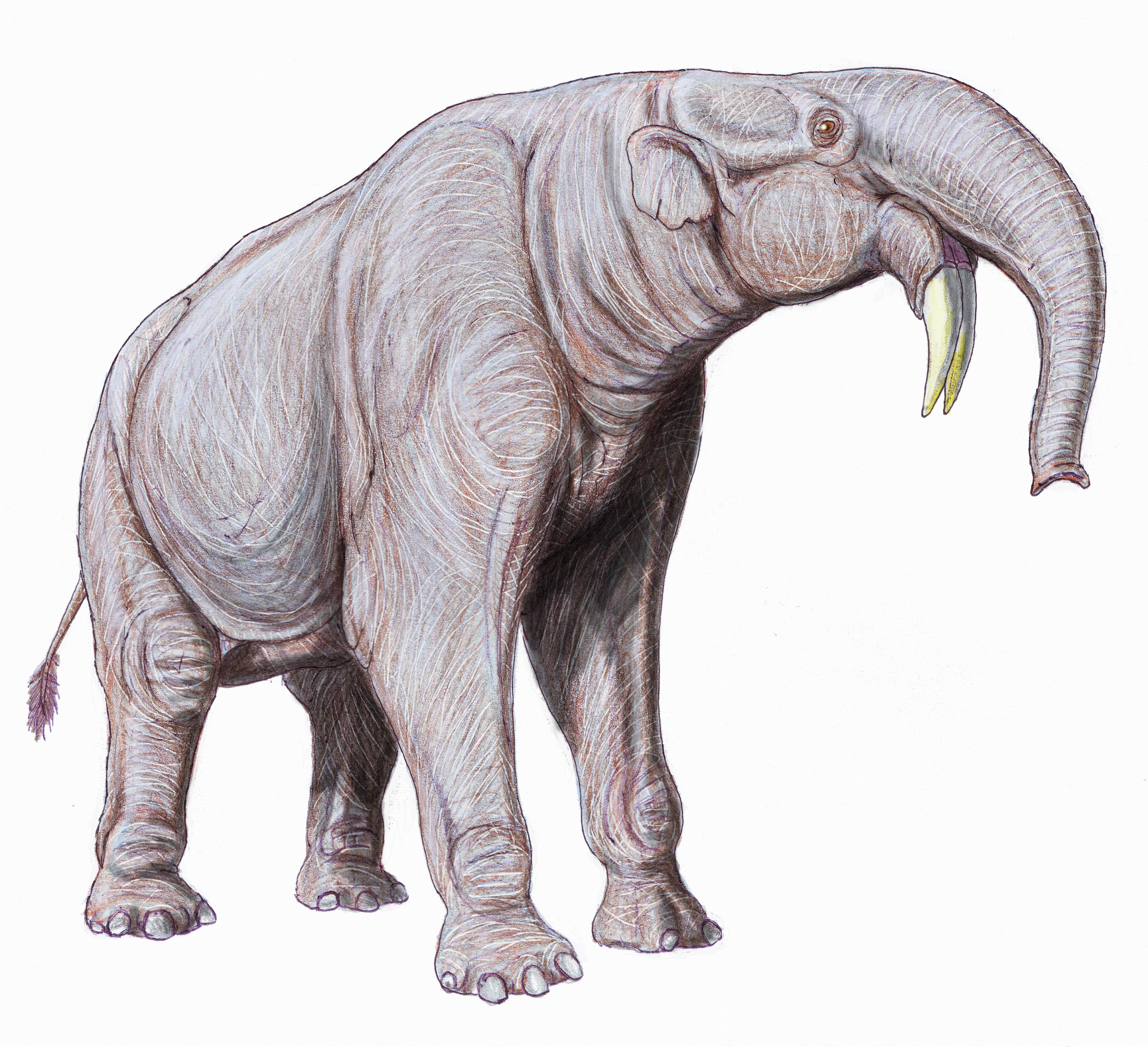
Deinotherium

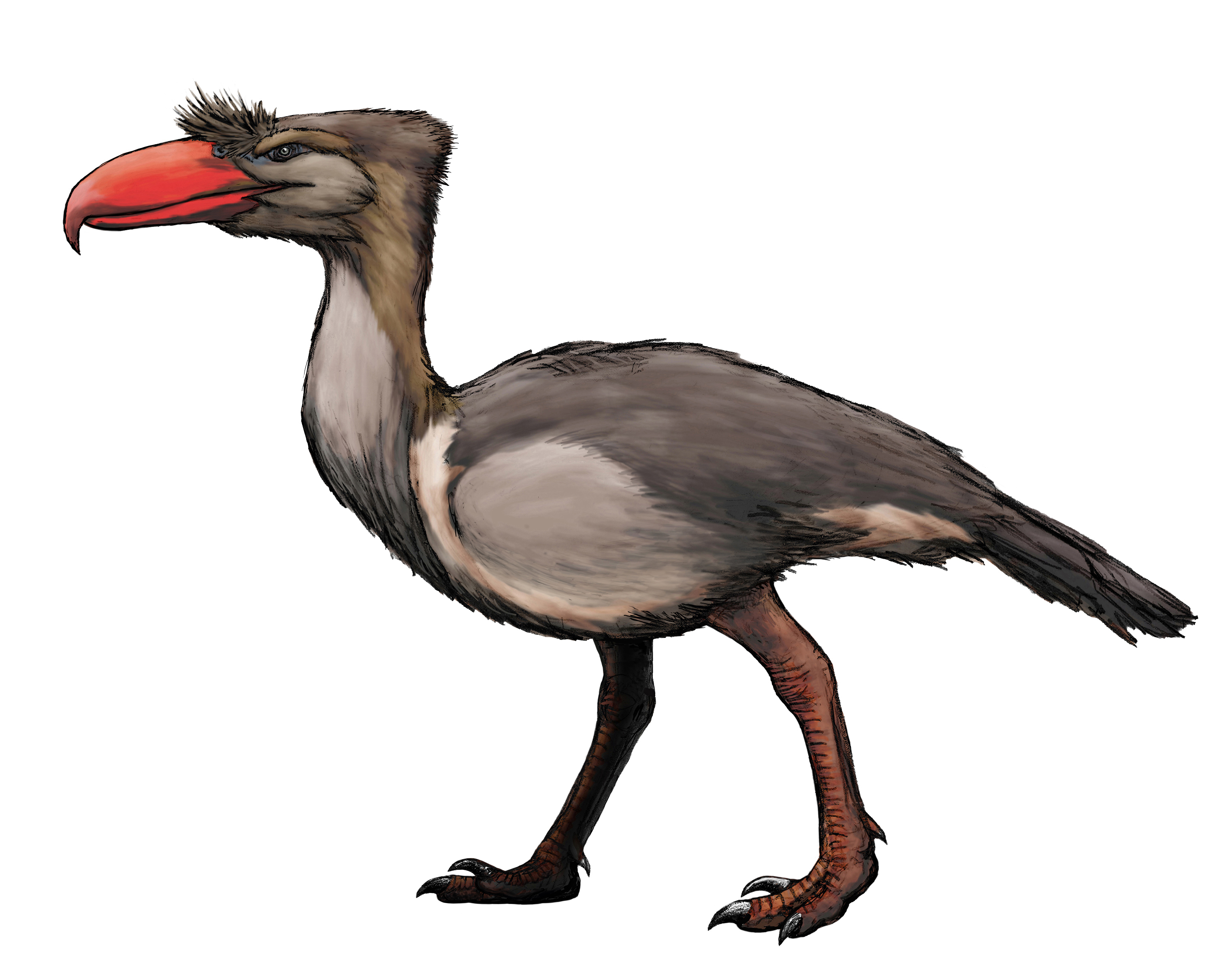
Kelenken guillermoi

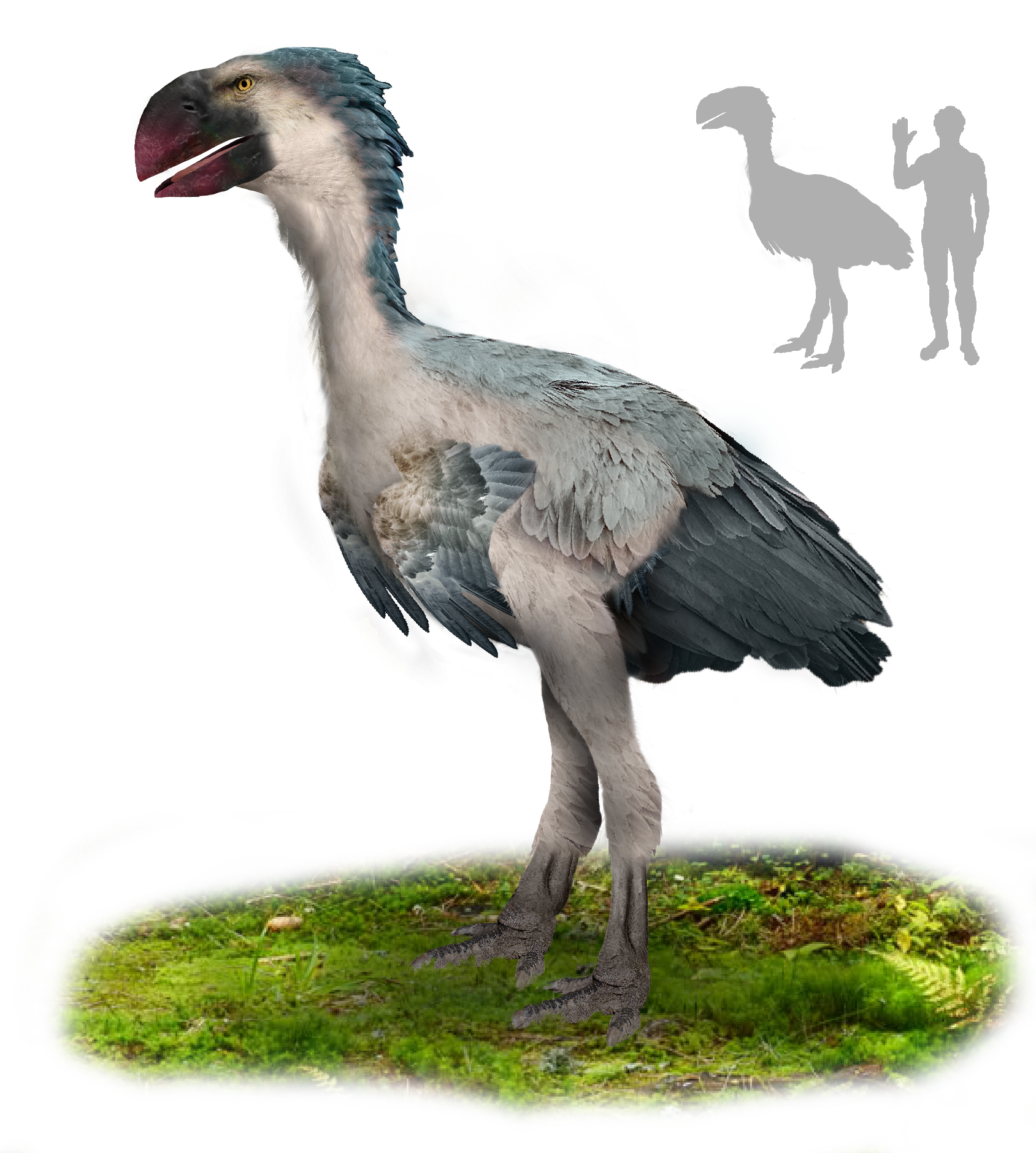
Gastornis gigantea

=== Extant ===
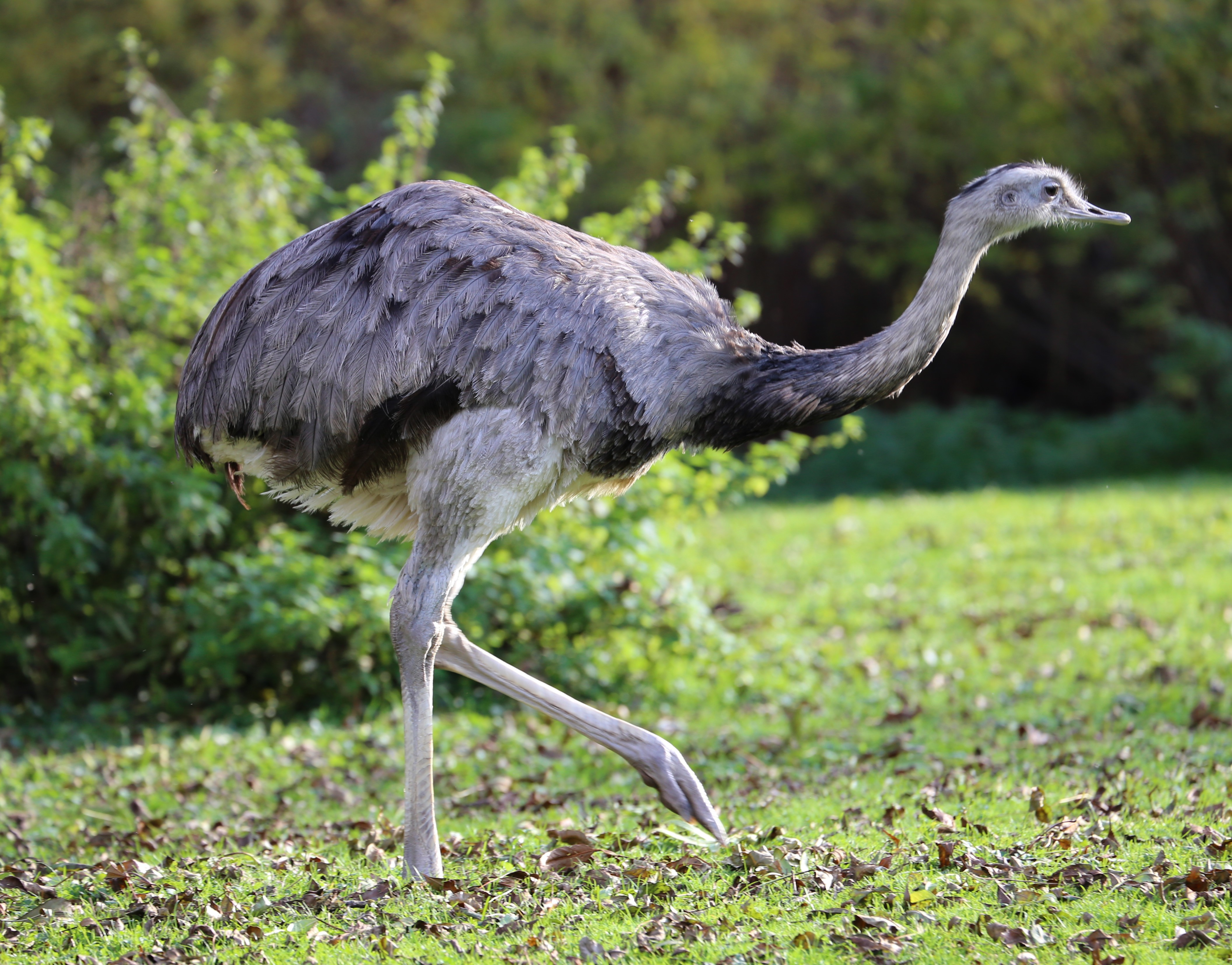
Greater rhea

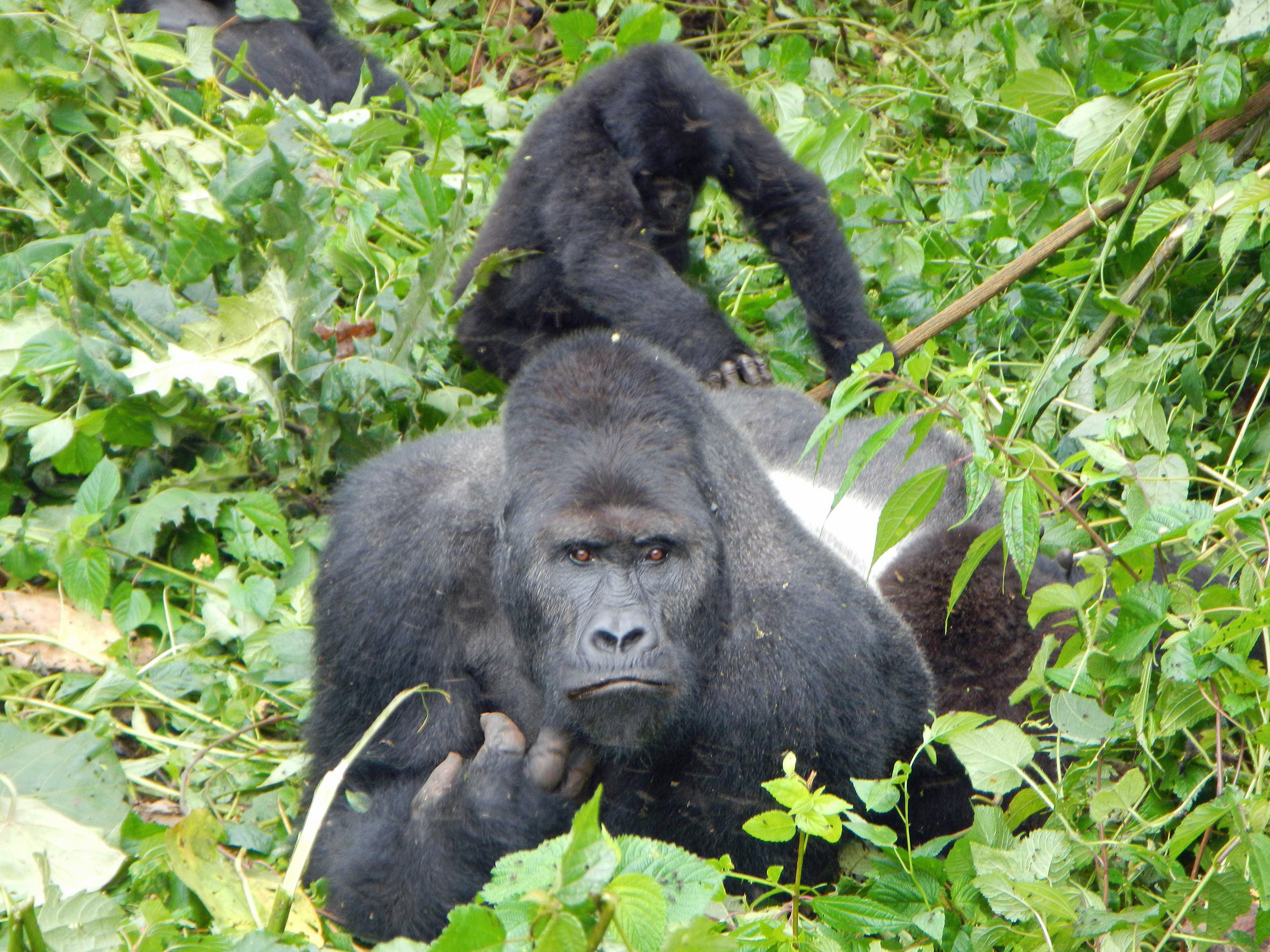
Eastern gorilla

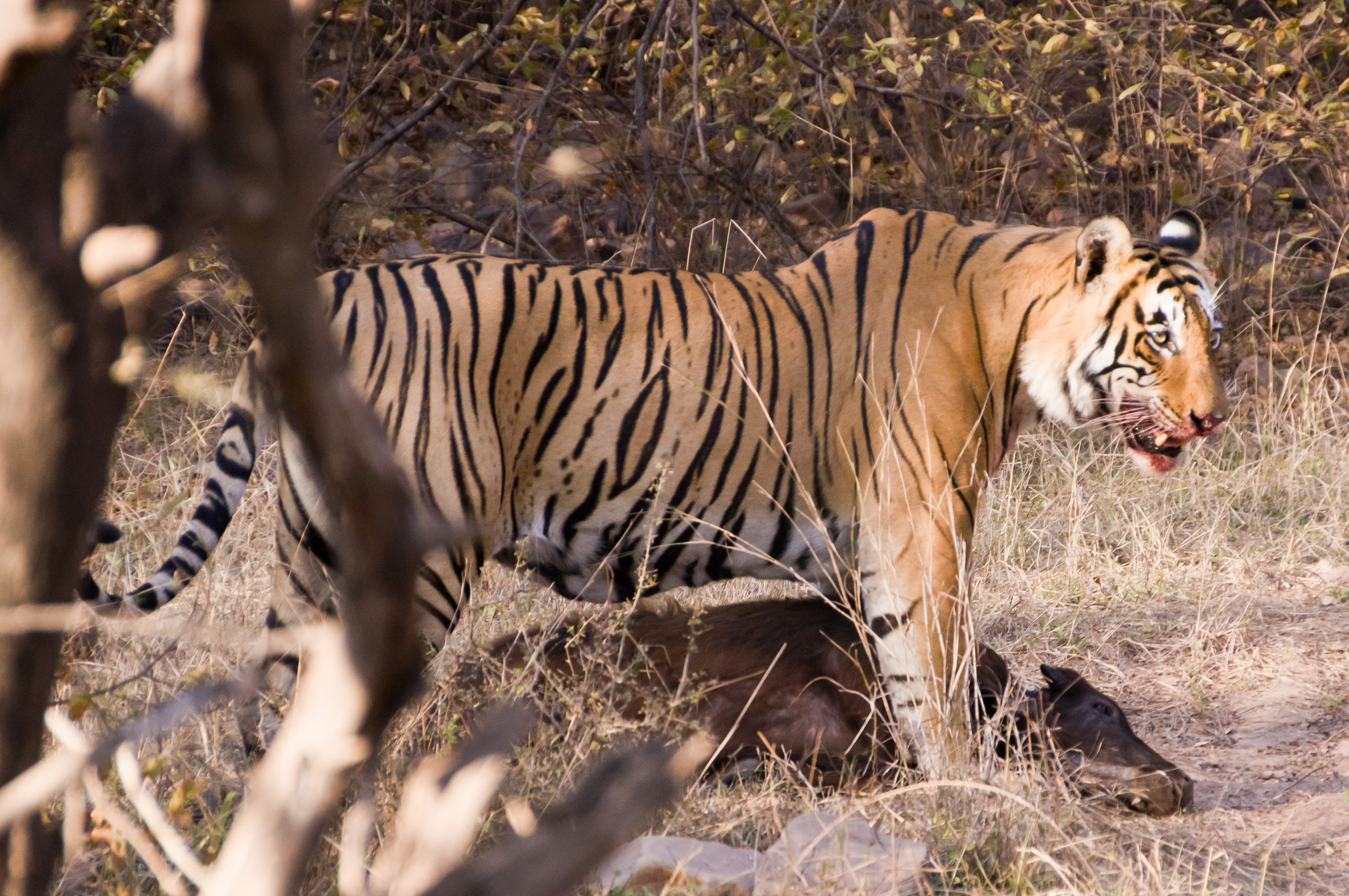
Bengal tiger

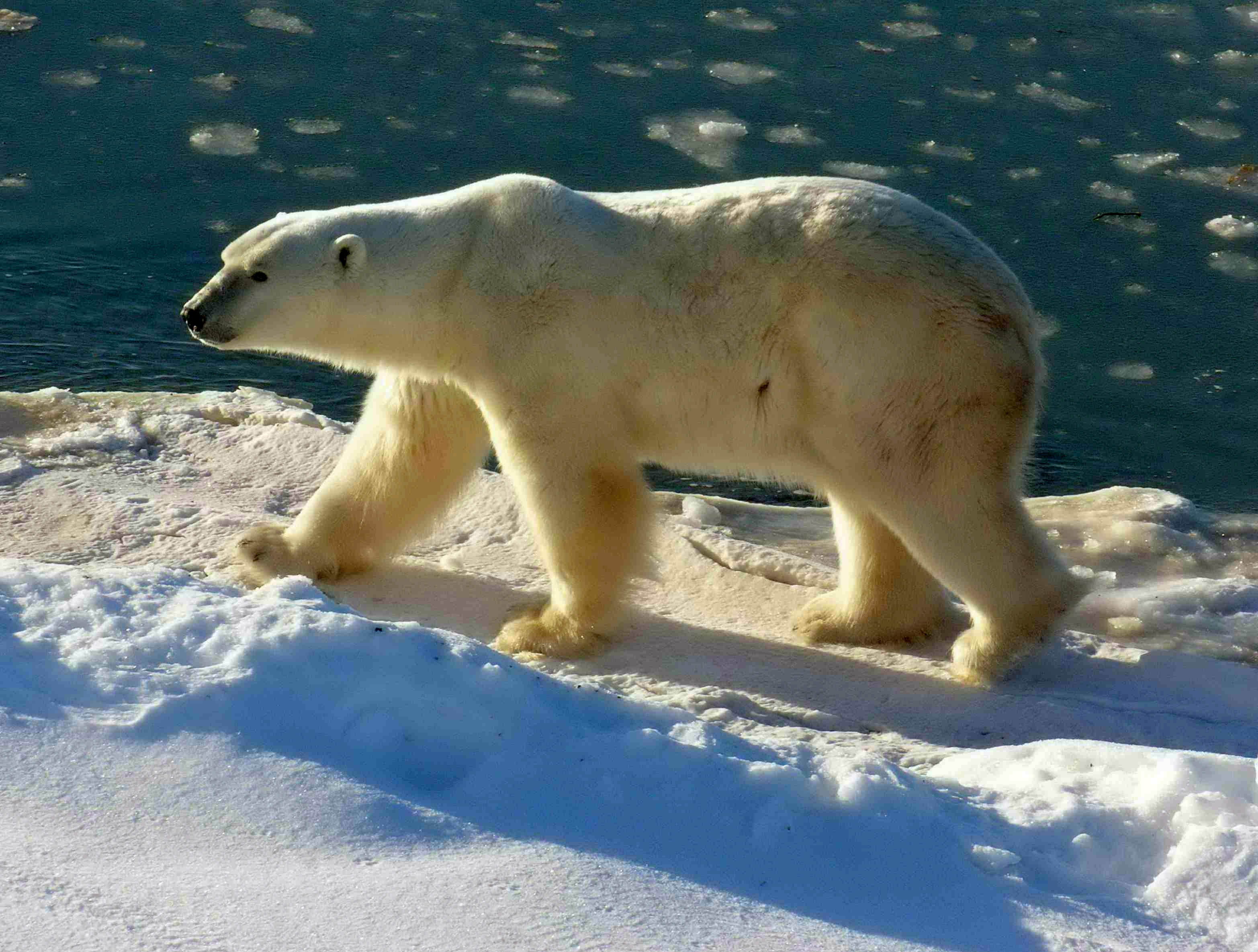
Polar bear

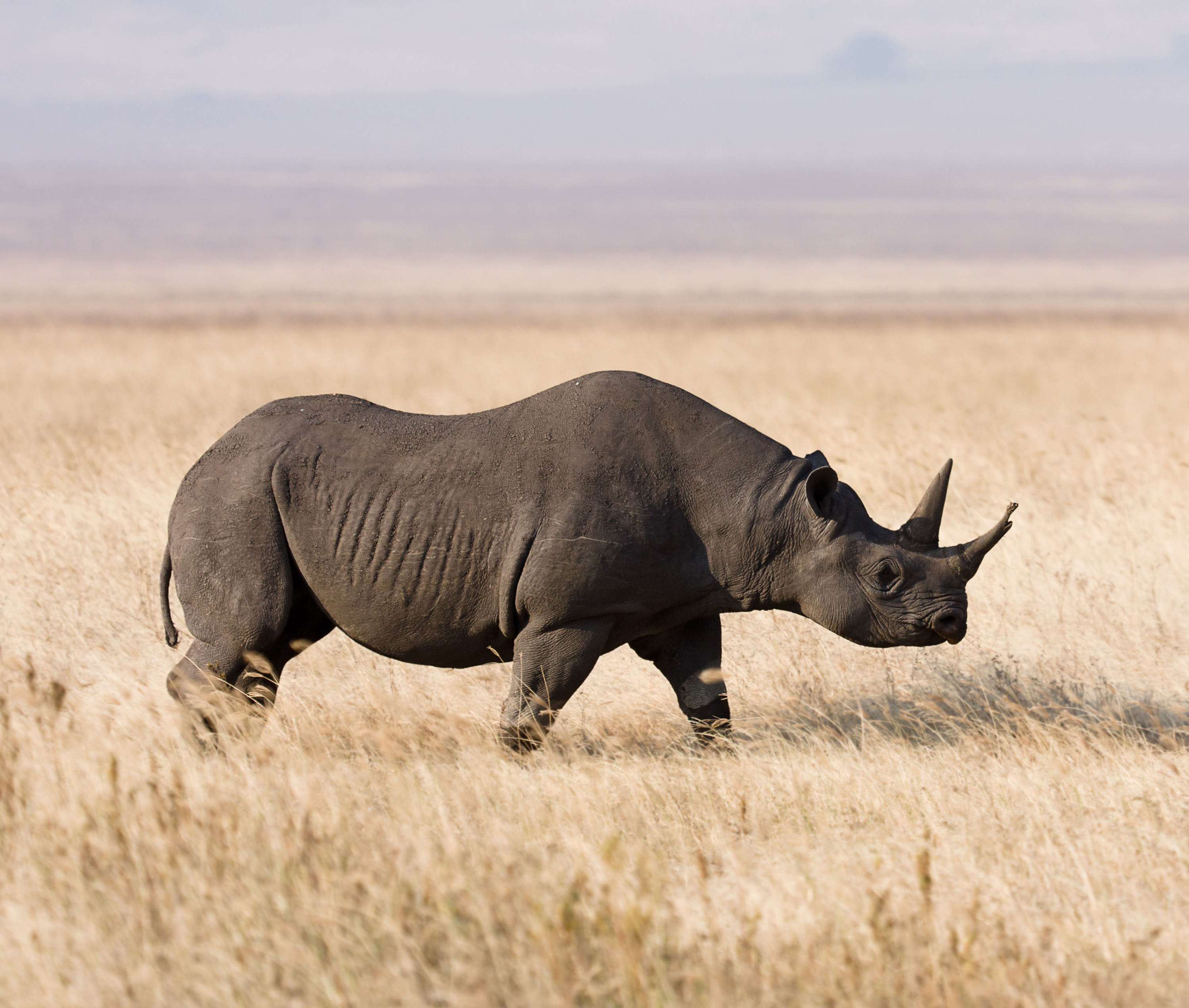
Black rhinoceros

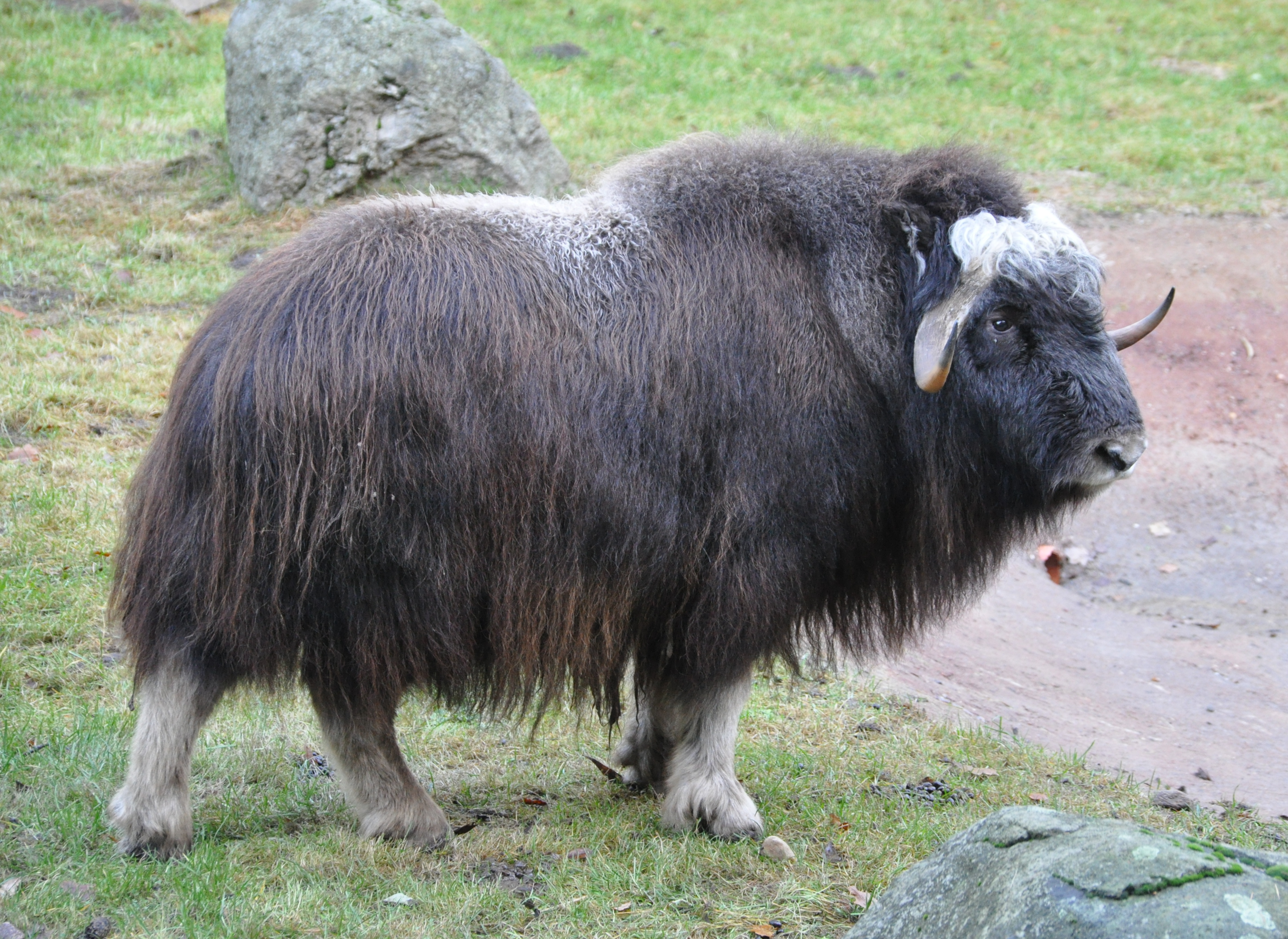
Muskox

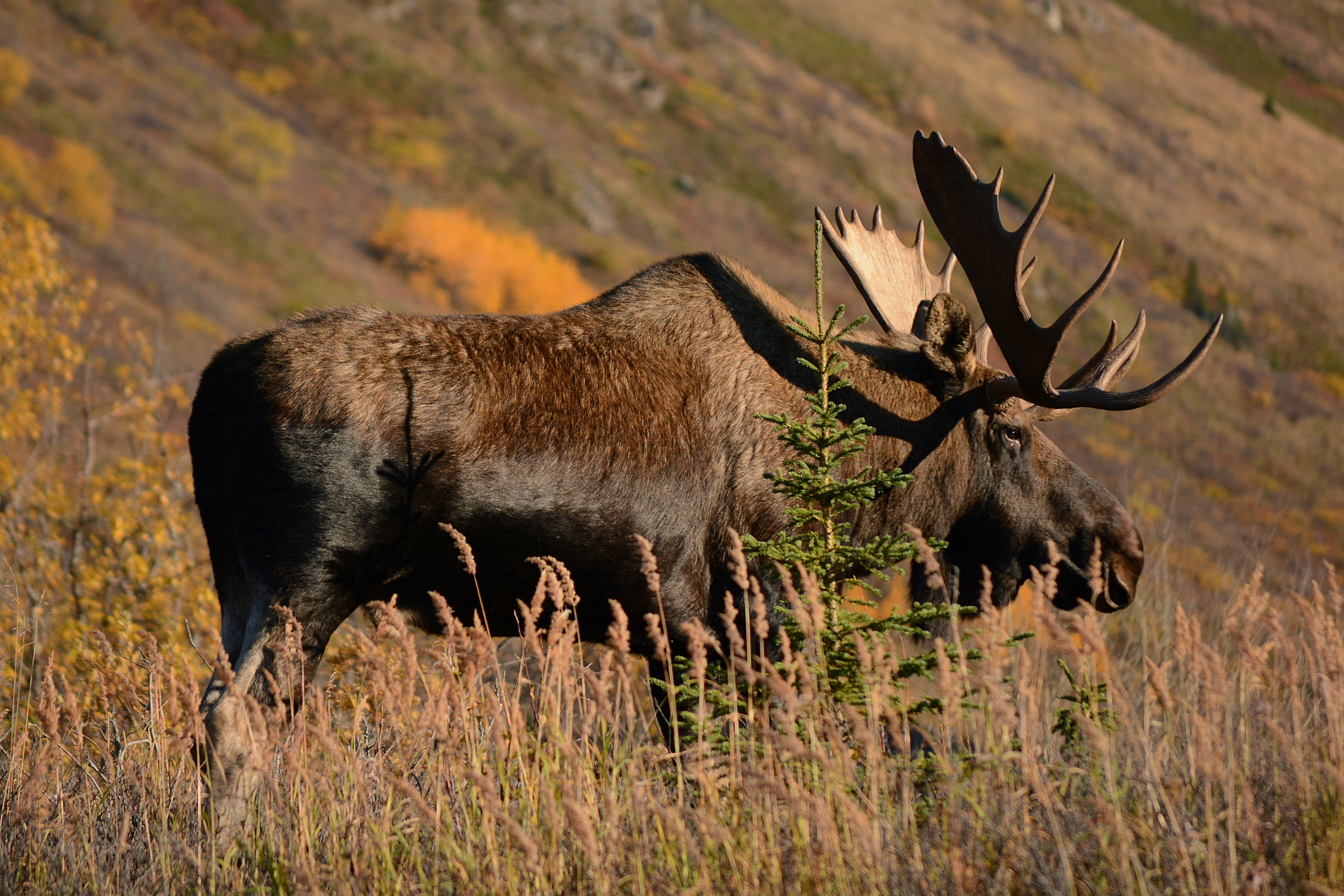
Moose

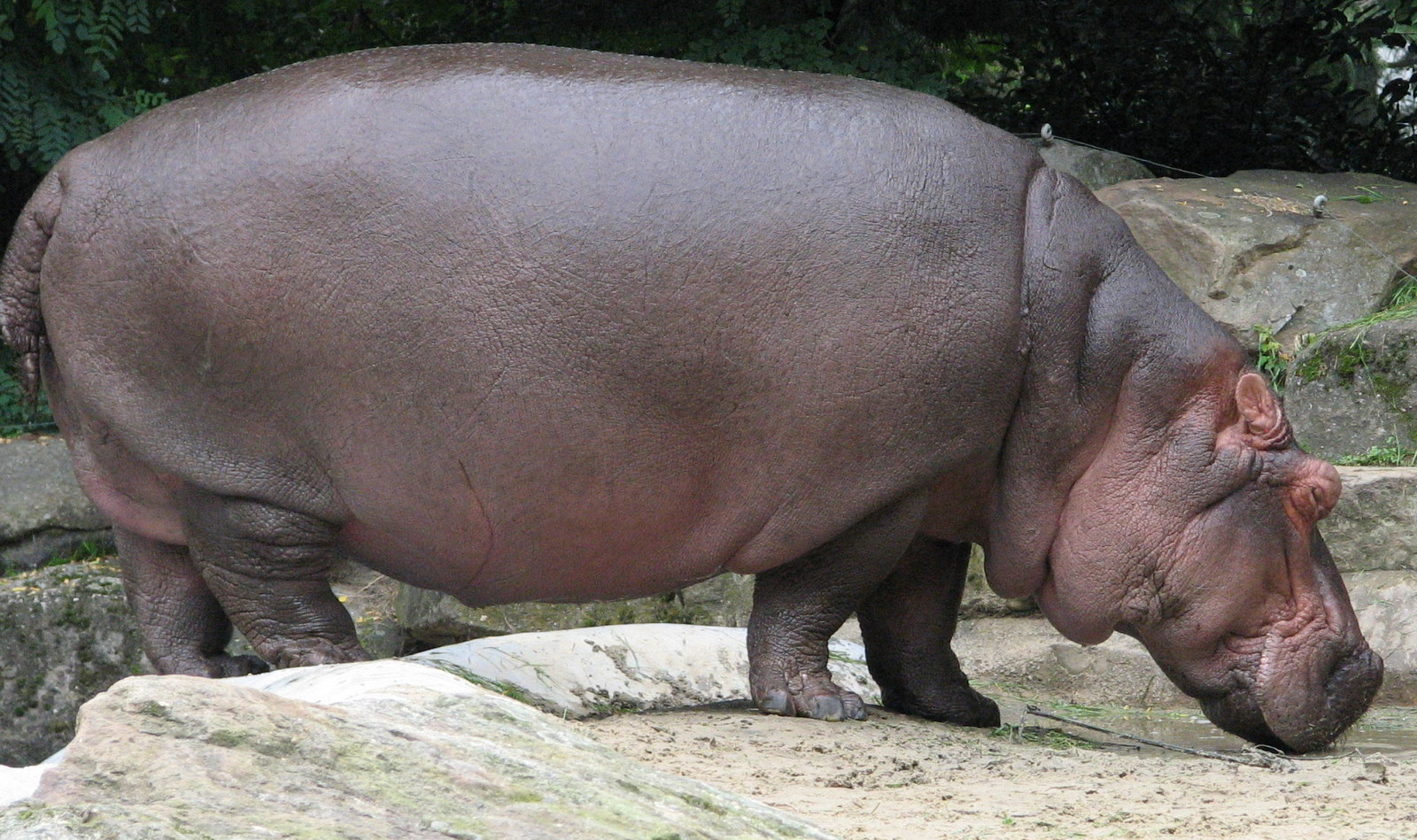
Hippopotamus

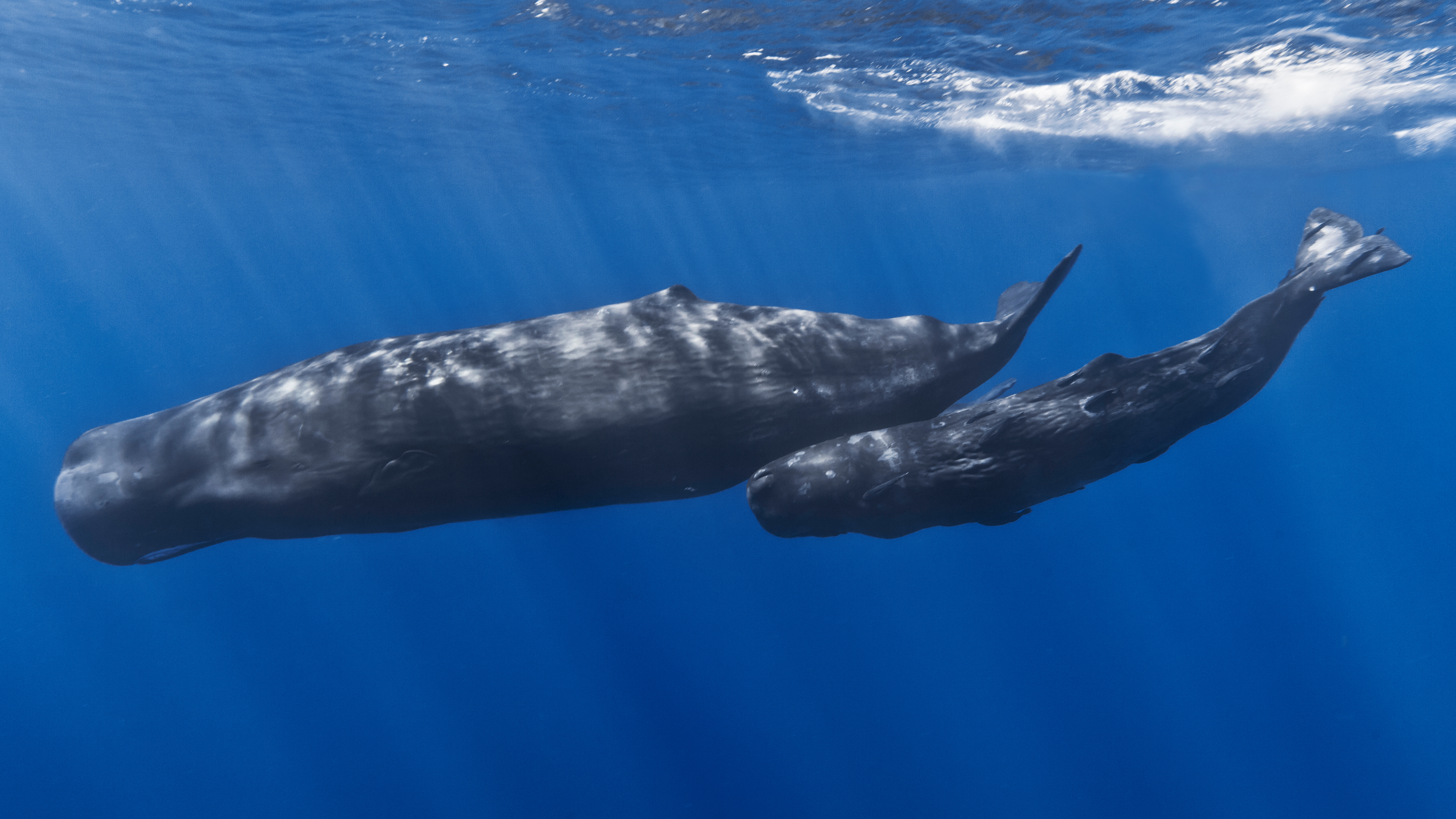
Adult sperm whale and calf

Orcas

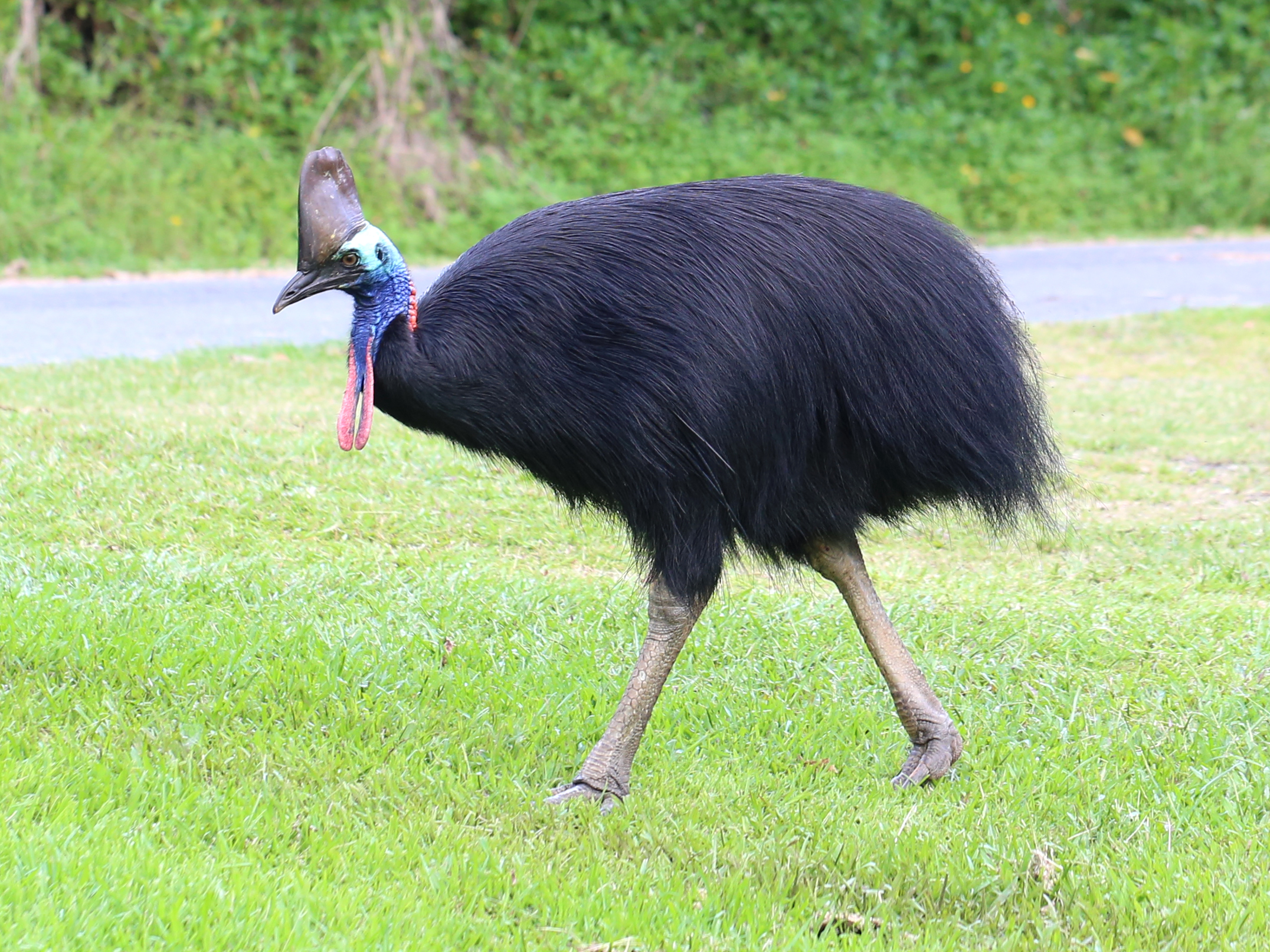
Southern cassowary

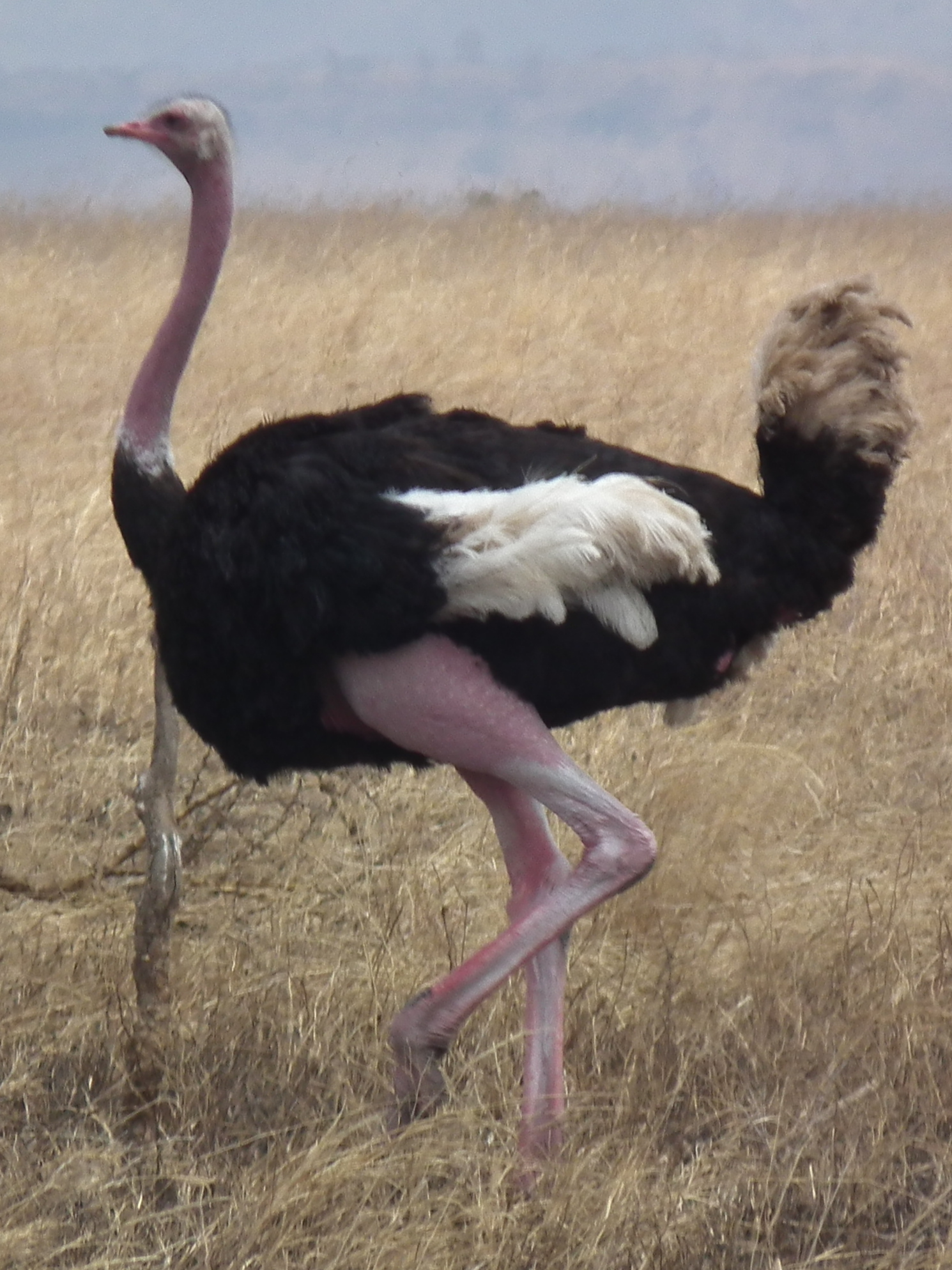
Common ostrich

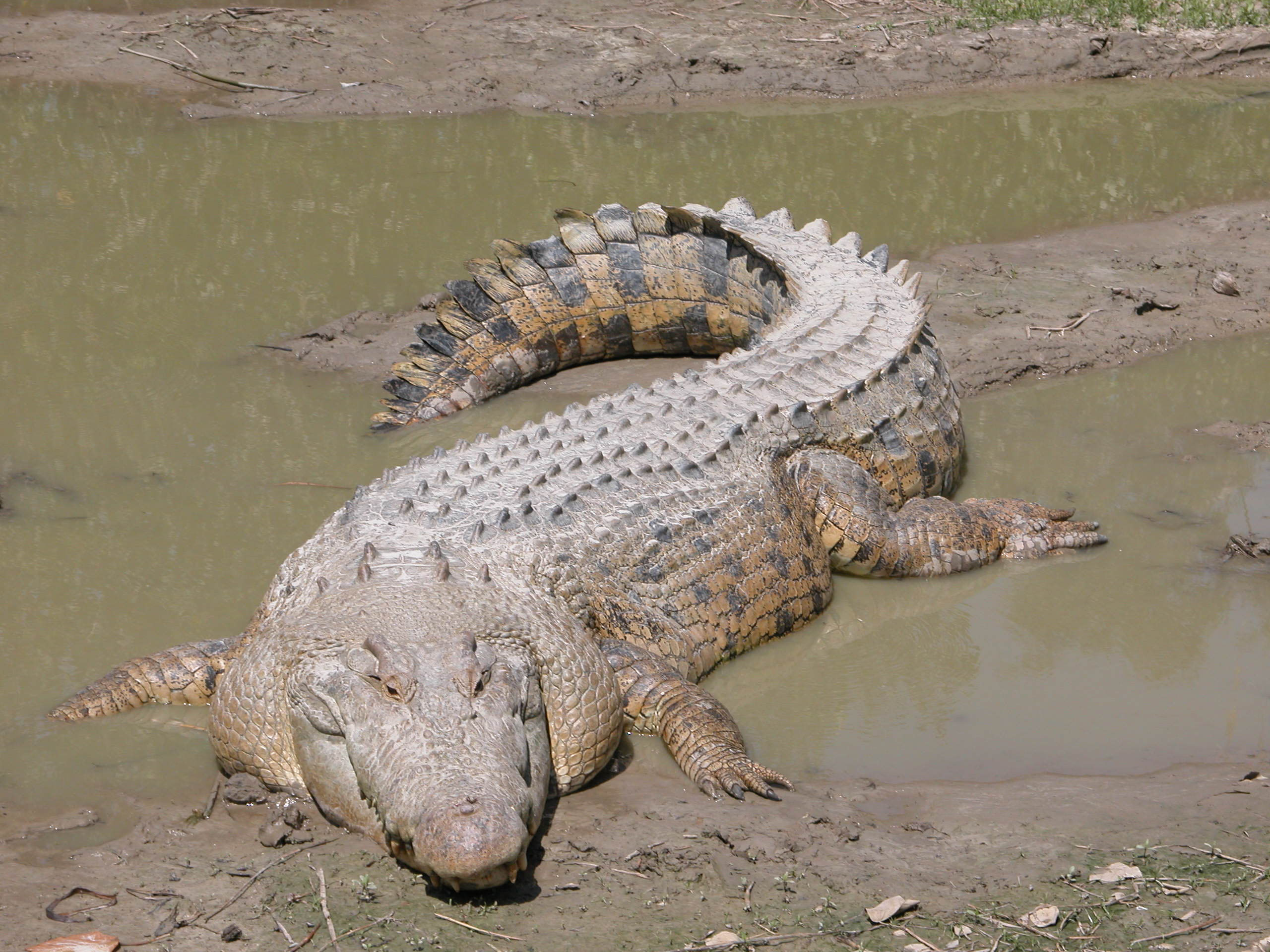
Saltwater crocodile

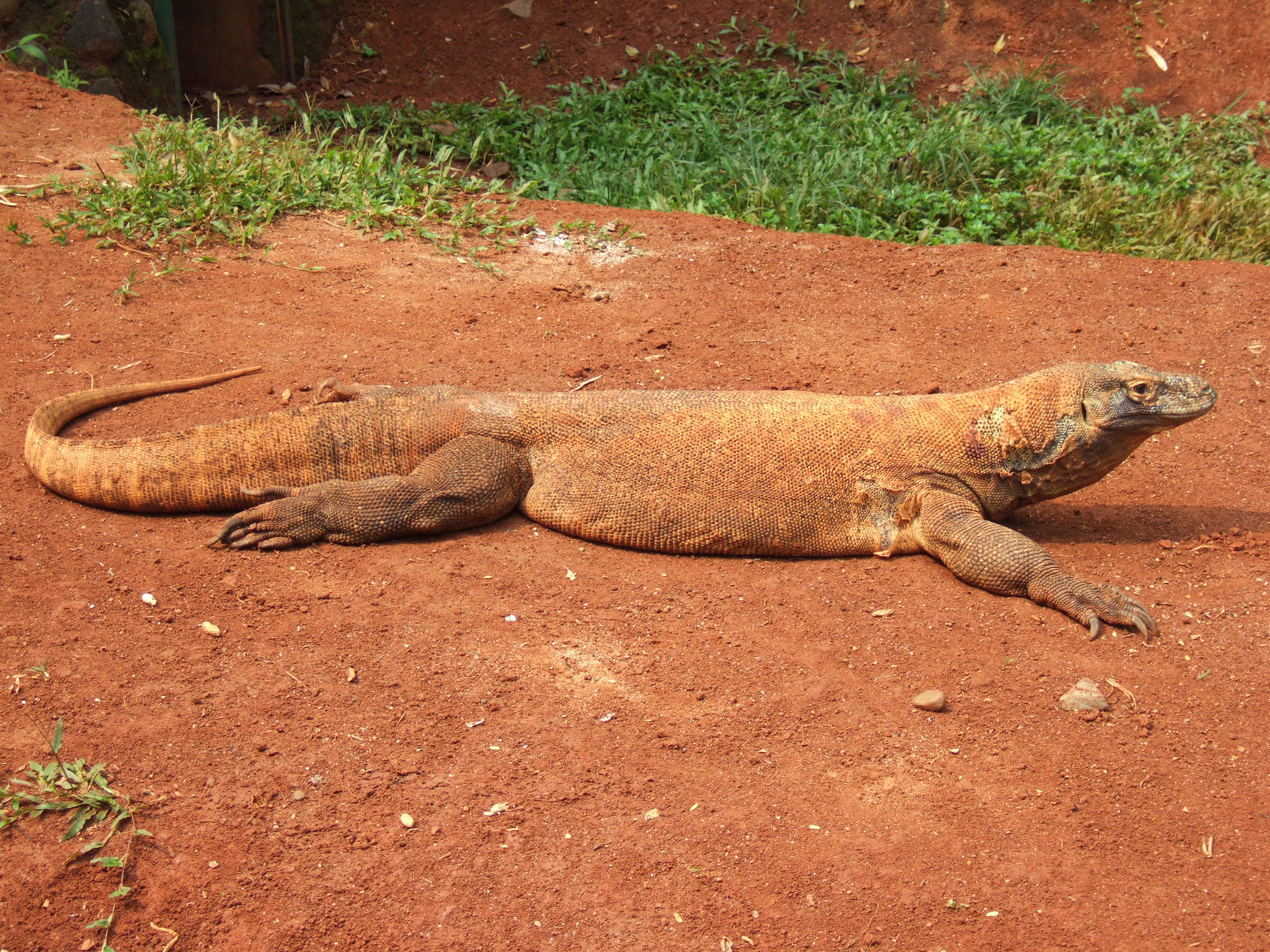
Komodo dragon

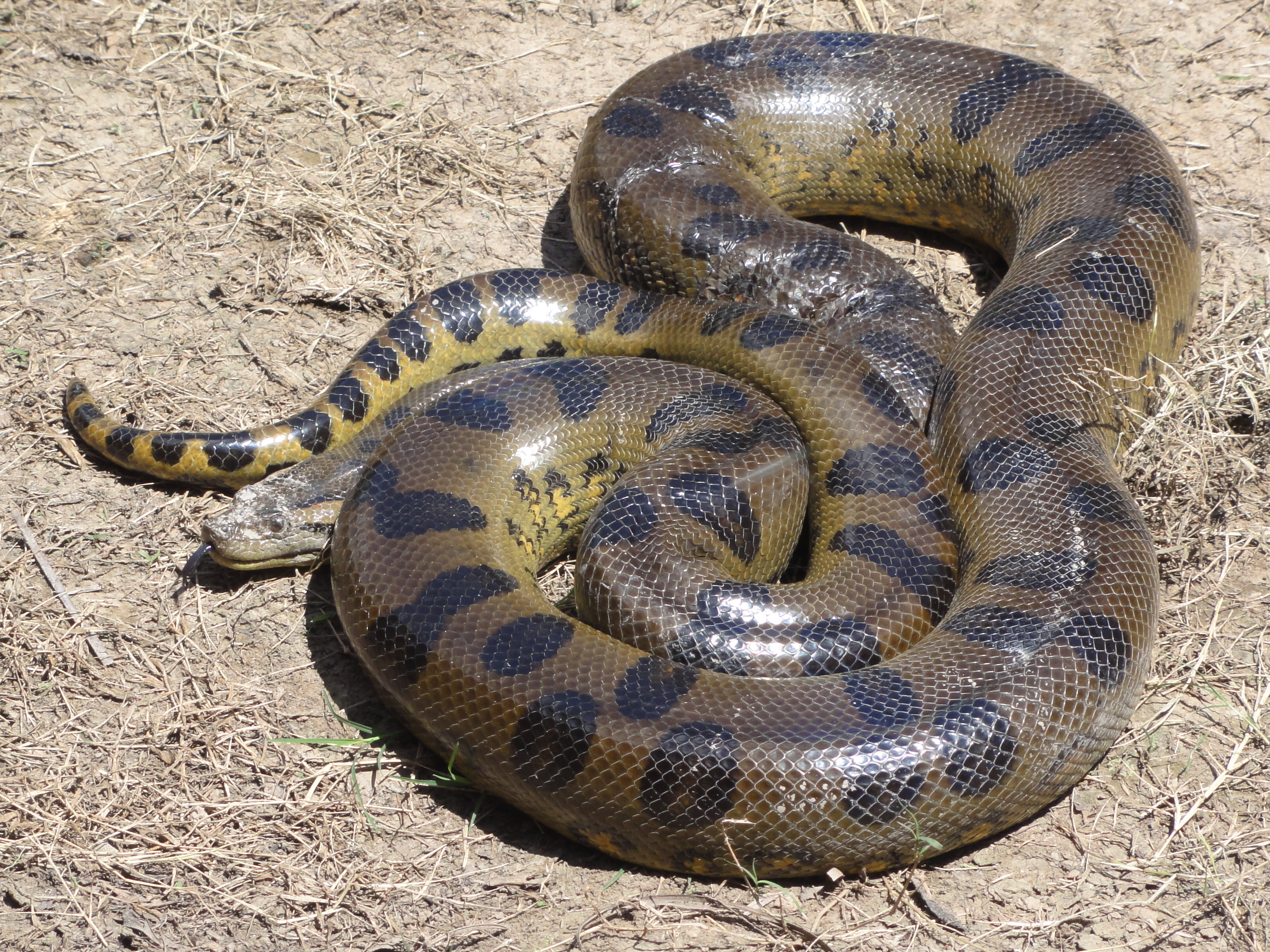
Green anaconda

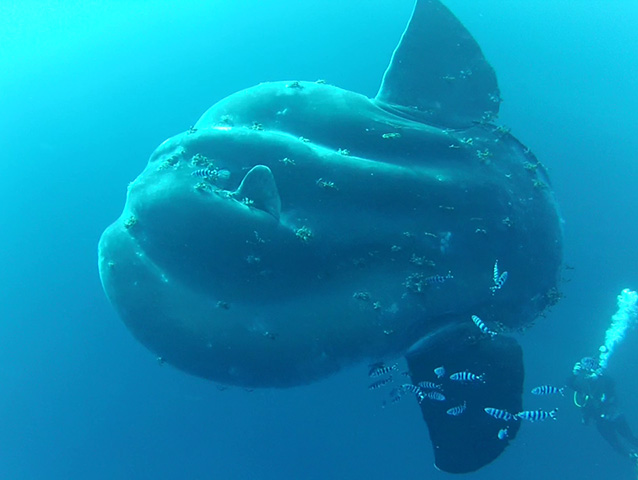
Giant sunfish

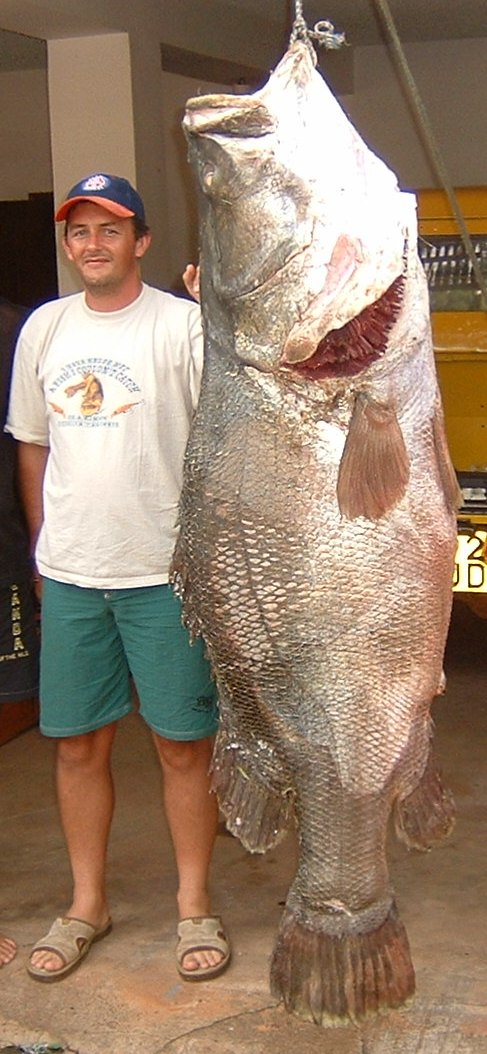
Nile perch

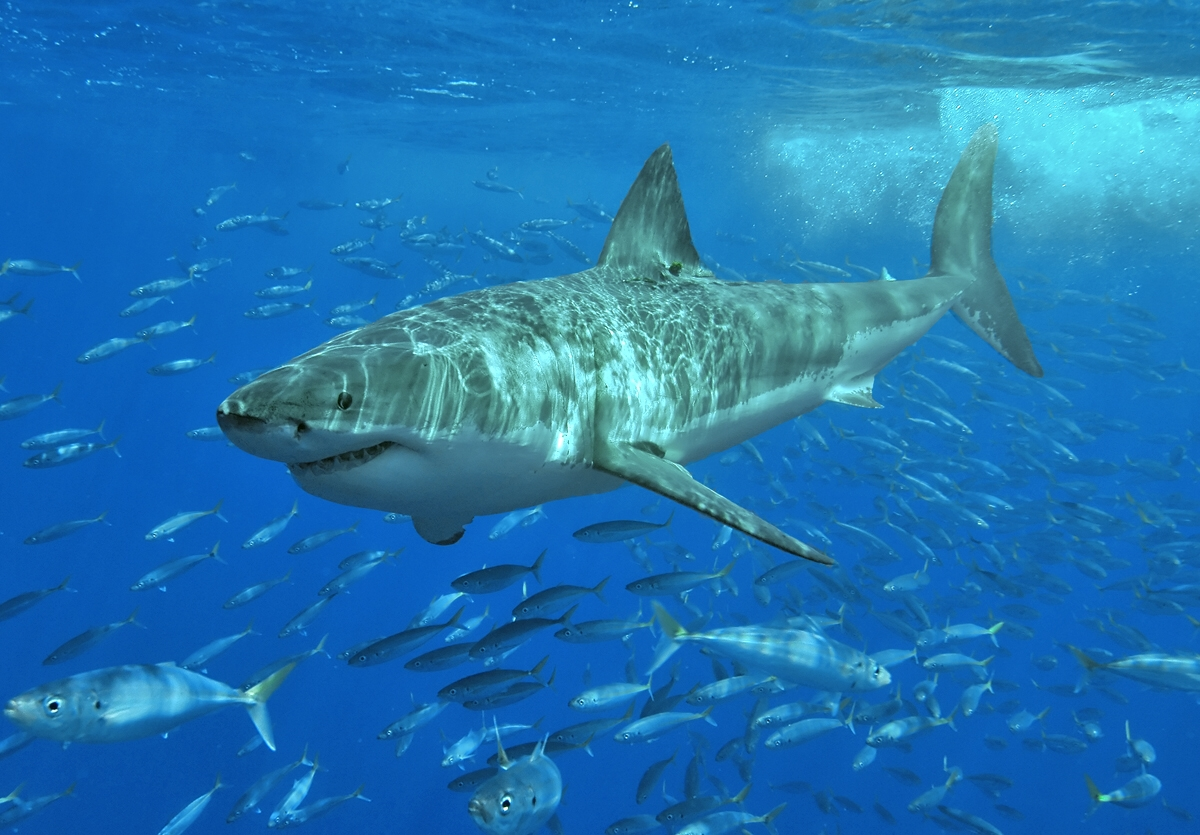
Great white shark

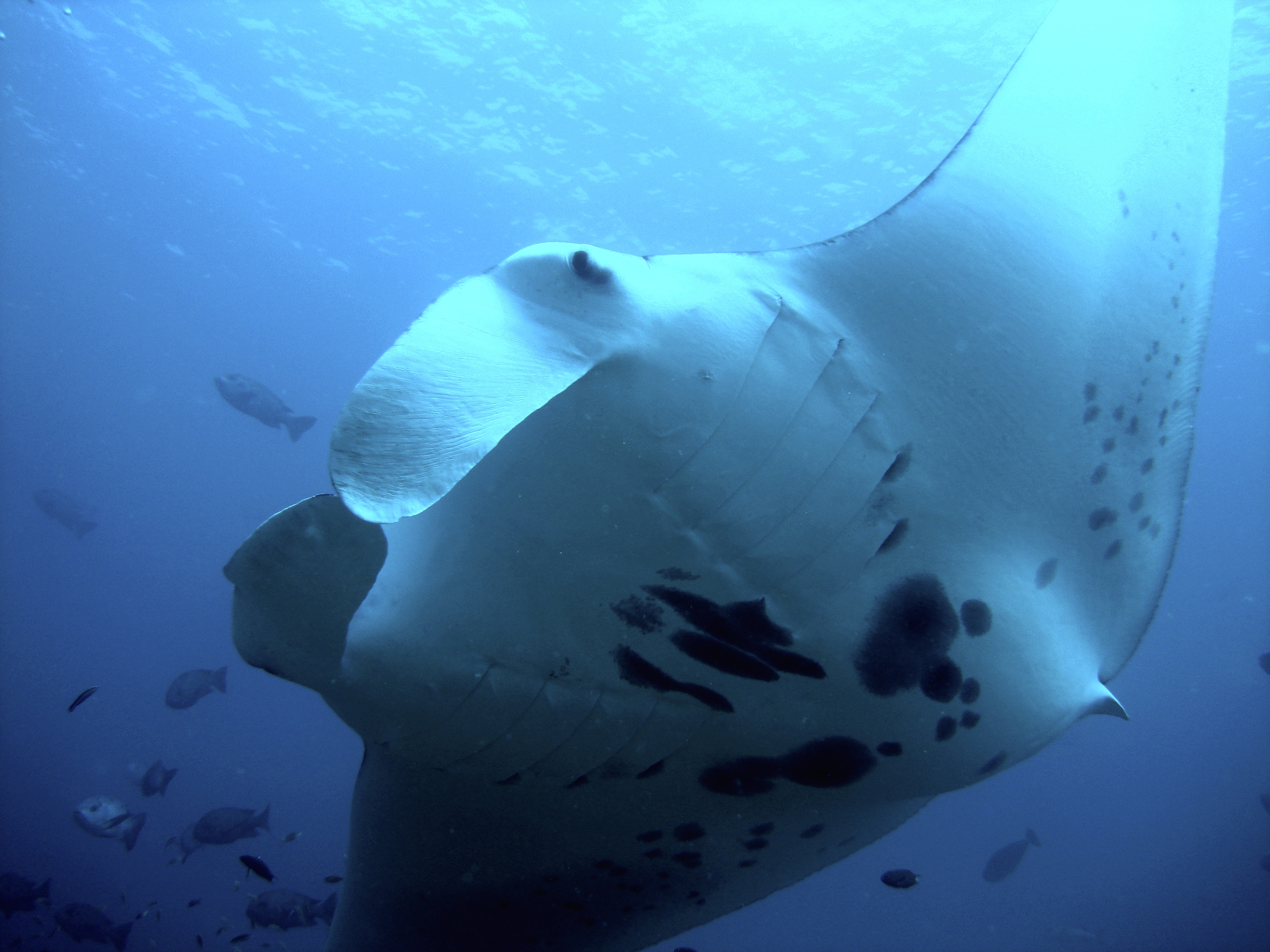
Reef manta ray

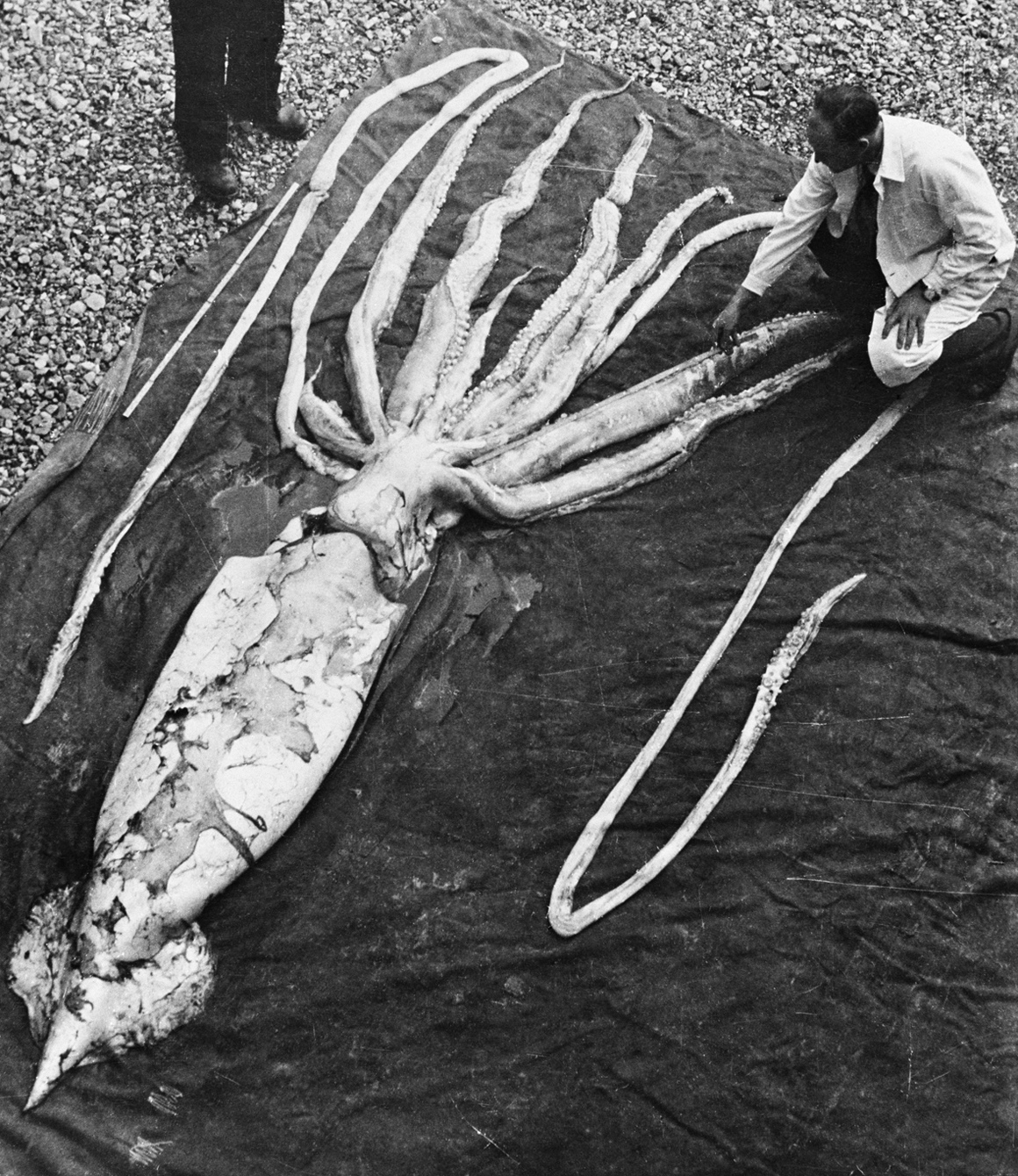
Carcass of a giant squid

== See also ==
- Australian megafauna
- Bergmann's rule
- Charismatic megafauna
- Cope's rule
- Deep-sea gigantism
- Dinosaur size
- Island gigantism
- Largest organisms
- Largest prehistoric animals
- List of heaviest land mammals
- List of largest mammals
- List of megafauna discovered in modern times
- Megafauna (mythology)
- Megafaunal wolf
- Megaflora
- Megaherb
- Quaternary extinction event
