= Lynch's Crater =

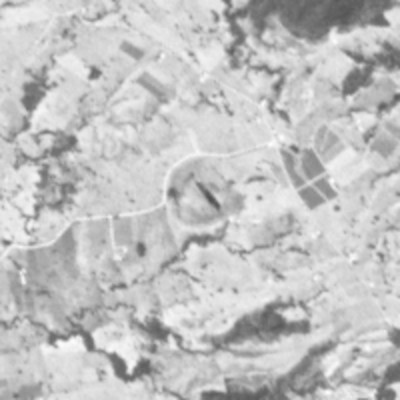
Lynch's crater at center, in 1984. Image is about 5 km wide.

Lynch's Crater (17°21′59″S 145°41′10″E) formed about 230,000 years ago during an explosive volcanic eruption, creating a maar on the eastern edge of the Atherton Tableland in Queensland, Australia. Located at an altitude of about 760 m, the crater is about 80 m deep and has been heavily worn by erosion. Following its formation, a crater lake formed in the depression that was gradually filled in with deposits, so that the surface is now an average of 45 m beneath the rim. The present day interior is filled with swampy ground that is maintained by a stream flowing in from the eastern side. This water exits the crater to form a tributary of the North Johnstone River. The mean annual rainfall at this site is 2,500 mm.

Sedimentary deposits in the crater provide pollen samples covering most of the last 200,000 years of vegetation growth in the region; spanning the last two glacial periods. During the interglacial epochs, the crater was occupied by mesic evergreen rainforest. In the cooler glacial periods, this was replaced by rain forests prevalent in drier climes. From 40,000 years ago, the crater was gradually occupied by sclerophyll vegetation such as Casuarina and Eucalyptus, with the transition being completed 26,000 years ago. Around 10,000 years ago, evergreen vegetation once more regained dominance. Particles of charcoal dated from up to 38,000 years ago are believed to be the result of fires lit by Aboriginal Australians, and are coincident with the appearance of the sclerophyll vegetation and loss of regional megafauna.

Lake Barrine and Lake Eacham, to the northwest of Lynch's crater, are also maars formed by volcanic explosions.
