= Lynch (given name) =

Lynch is a masculine given name which may refer to:

- Lynch Cooper (c. 1905–1971), Aboriginal Australian sprinter
- Sir Lynch Cotton, 4th Baronet (c. 1705–1775), Member of Parliament
- Lynch Davidson (1873–1952), American politician, Lieutenant Governor of Texas from 1921 to 1923
- Lynch Ipera (born 1976), Papua New Guinean boxer
