= Harriet (name) =

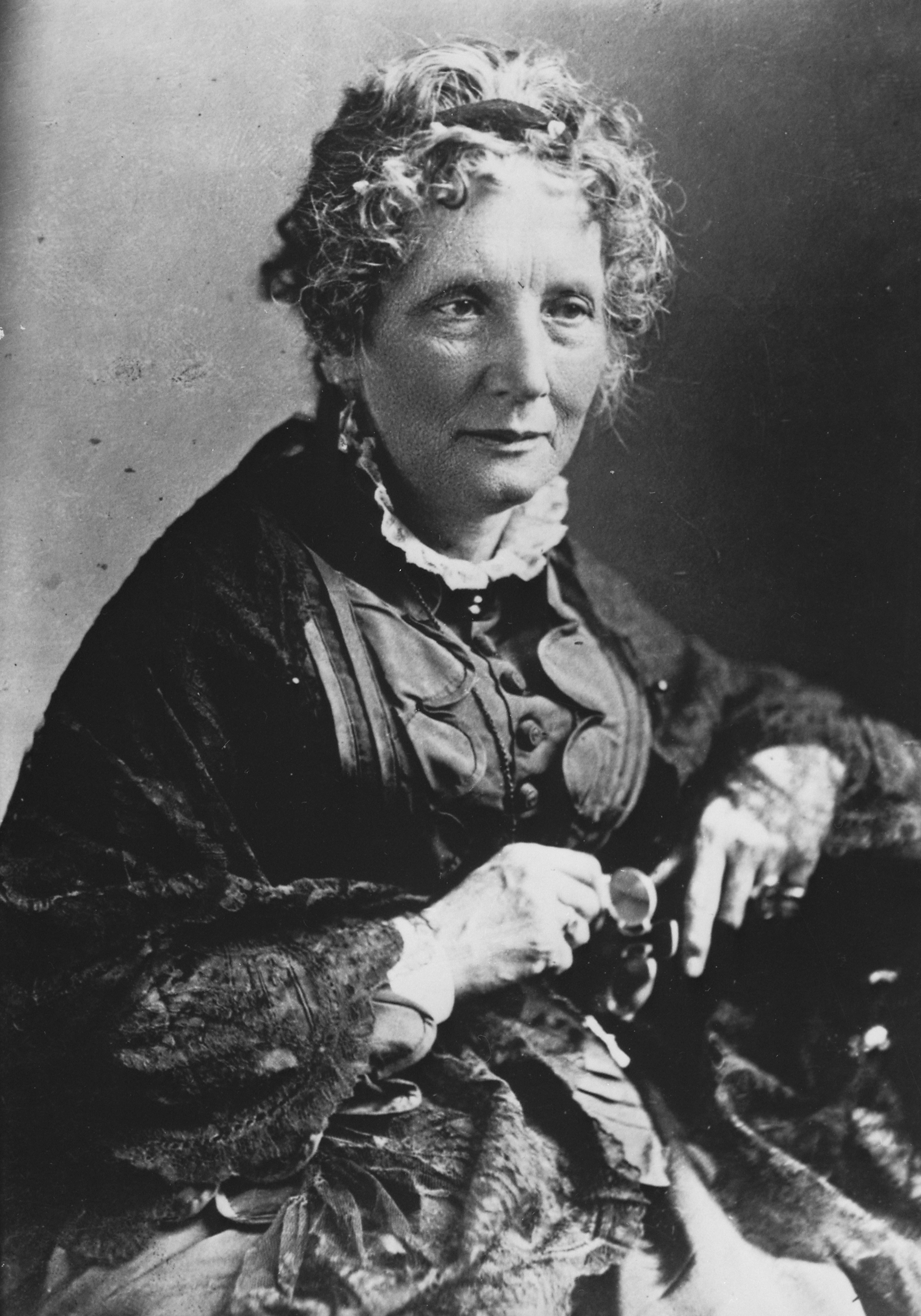
- Harriet Beecher Stowe is one famous Harriet.
- Gender: Female

Origin
- Origin: Germanic
- Meaning: "home ruler"

Other names
- Related names: Henry, Henriette, Henrietta, Harolda, Harry, Henrik, Hattie, Hatty

Harriet is a female given name.

The name is an English version of the French Henriette, a female form of Henri. The male name Harry was formed in a similar way from Henry. All these names are derived from Henrik, which is ultimately derived from the Germanic name Heimiric, derived from the word elements heim, or "home" and ric, meaning "power, ruler". The male name Henry was first used in England by Normans. Popular nicknames for Harriet or Harriett include Hallie, Hattie, Hatty, Hetty, Hettie, Hennie, Harolda, Harry, Harri, Harrie, and Etta or Ettie. The name can be lengthened to Harrietta, Henriette, or Henrietta.

The name was the 73rd most popular name for baby girls born in England and Wales in 2007. It last ranked in the top 1,000 most popular names for girls in the United States in the 1960s.

== Variants ==
- Drika ( Dutch)
- Endika (Basque)
- Enrica, Enrichetta, Errichetta (Italian)
- Enriqueta (Spanish)
- Etta (English)
- Etti (English, Indonesian)
- Ettie (English, Indonesian)
- Eti (Indonesian)
- Etty (English, Indonesian)
- Haliaka (Hawaiian)
- Halle (English)
- Hallie (English)
- Hani (Australian, Arabic)
- Hariala (Hawaiian)
- Hariata (Hawaiian)
- Harrieta (English)
- Harriet (English)
- Harriët (Dutch)
- Harriett (English)
- Harrietta (English)
- Harriette (English)
- Harriot (English)
- Harriott (English)
- Hat (English)
- Hatsy (English)
- Hatt (English/Scots)
- Hatti (English)
- Hattie (English)
- Hatty (English)
- Hazza (English)
- Heike (Dutch, Frisian, German)
- Heina (German)
- Heine (German)
- Heinrike (German)
- Heintje (Dutch)
- Hendrika (Dutch)
- Hendrikje (Dutch)
- Hendrina (Dutch)
- Hendriana (Dutch)
- Hendriëtte (Dutch)
- Henka (Polish)
- Henna (Finnish, Indonesian)
- Heni (Indonesian)
- Hennie (Dutch, English, German)
- Henny (Dutch, German, English, Indonesian)
- Henrieta (Polish, Slovak)
- Henrietta (English, Hungarian, Swedish)
- Henríetta (Icelandic)
- Henriette (Danish, Dutch, French, German, Norwegian, Swedish)
- Henriëtte (Dutch)
- Henriett (Hungarian)
- Henrieke (Dutch)
- Henrike (German)
- Henriikka (Finnish)
- Henrika (Swedish)
- Henrike (German, Scandinavian)
- Henriqueta (Portuguese)
- Henryka (Polish)
- Hetta (English)
- Hetti (English)
- Hettie (English)
- Hetty (English, German, Dutch, Indonesian)
- Jetta (German)
- Jette (Dutch, German, Danish)
- Jet (Dutch)
- Jindřiška (Czech)
- Έρρικα (Errica, Errika) (Greek)
- Riette (French, Dutch)
- Riëtte (Dutch)
- Rieke (Dutch)
- Rika (Dutch, Swedish)
- Rike (German)
- Riri (French)
- Riikka (Finnish)
- Yetta (English)
- Yette (Dutch)
- Yettie (English, Indonesian)
- Yeti (Indonesian)
- Yetty (English, Indonesian)
- Harrie (English)
- Hari (Indonesian)
- Heri (Indonesian)

== As a given name ==
- Harriet Adams (1892–1982), American juvenile novelist
- Harriet Chalmers Adams (1875–1937), American writer, explorer and photographer
- Harriet Ryan Albee (1829–1873), American social reformer and philanthropist
- Harriet Andersson (born 1937), Swedish actress
- Harriet Anena, Ugandan writer and performer
- Harriet Arbuthnot (1793–1834), English diarist, social observer, and political hostess
- Harriett Ellen Grannis Arey (1819–1901), American educator, author, editor, publisher
- Harriet Pritchard Arnold (1858–1901), American author
- Harriet Auber (1773–1862), English poet, hymnwriter
- Harriet Hubbard Ayer (1849–1903), American cosmetics entrepreneur and journalist
- Harriet Backer (1845–1932), Norwegian painter
- Harriett Baldwin (born 1960), British politician
- Harriett Ball (1941–2011), American educator who inspired the KIPP program
- Harriet Bates (1856–1886), American novelist, poet
- Harriet Bibby (born 1998), English actress
- Harriet Blackstone (1864–1939), American artist
- Harriet Bland (1915–1991), American sprinter
- Harriet Bosse (1878–1961), Swedish-Norwegian actress
- Harriet Boyd-Hawes (1871–1945), American archaeologist
- Harriet G. Brittan (1822–1897), British-born American missionary
- Harriet Brooks (1876–1933), Canadian nuclear physicist
- Harriet Browne (1798–1858), British music composer
- Harriet Browne (1932–1997), American tap dancer, educator and choreographer
- Harriet Louisa Browne (1829–1906), New Zealand political salon hostess, community leader, and writer
- Harriet Bruce-Annan (born 1965), Ghanaian programmer and humanitarian
- Harriet Starr Cannon (1823–1896), American nun who founded the Sisterhood of St. Mary
- Harriet Frances Carpenter (1868/75 – 1956), American educator, writer, suffragist
- Harriet Carr (1771–1848), British artist
- Harriet E. Clark (1850–1945), American teacher and author
- Harriet Ludlow Clarke (died 1866), British artist
- Harriet Sophia Cobb (1846–1929), New Zealand photographer
- Harriet Redfield Cobb (1866–1958), American mathematics educator
- Harriet Abbott Lincoln Coolidge (1849–1902), American author, philanthropist, reformer
- Harriet L. Cramer (1847–1922), American newspaper publisher
- Harriet Cross, British politician
- Harriet Dart (born 1996), British tennis player
- Harriet Ball Dunlap (1867–1957), American social reformer
- Harriet Dyer (born 1988), Australian actress
- Harriet Elphinstone-Dick (1852–1902), English-Australian swimmer
- Harriet Farley (1812–1907), American writer, abolitionist, journalist, editor
- Harriet Ford (1863/8–1949), American actress, playwright
- Harriet Mary Ford (1859–1938), Canadian artist
- Harriet Bliss Ford (1876–1964), American writer
- Harriet Putnam Fowler (1842–1901), American writer
- Harriet Schneider French (1824–1906), American physician and temperance movement activist
- Harriet Whitney Frishmuth (1880–1980), American sculptor
- Harriet E. Garrison (1848–1930), American physician, writer
- Harriett Gilbert (born 1948), English writer and broadcaster
- Harriet Glanville (born 1927), American amateur golfer
- Harriet Newell Kneeland Goff (1828–1901), American author, temperance reformer
- Harriet Green (born 1961), British businesswoman
- Harriet Grote (1792–1878), English biographer, political strategist, and supporter of women's suffrage
- Harriet Hageman (born 1962), American politician and attorney
- Harriet Hall (1945–2023), American medical doctor and skeptic
- Harriet Louise Hardy (1905–1993), American physician and professor
- Harriet Harman (born 1950), British politician and life peer
- Harriet Newell Haskell (1835–1907), American educator and administrator
- Harriet Boyd Hawes (1871–1945), American archaeologist, nurse, relief worker, and professor
- Harriet Bell Hayden (1816–1893), African-American antislavery activist
- Harriet Hemings (1801–1870), one of four mixed-race children born to Sally Hemings
- Harriet Herbig-Matten (born 2003), German actress
- Harriet Hosmer (1830–1908), American sculptor
- Harriet Howard (1823–1865), mistress of Napoleon III
- Harriet Hunt (born 1978), English chess player
- Harriet Lane Huntress (1860–1922), American civil servant
- Harriet S. Iglehart (1927–2021), American philanthropist
- Harriet Jacobs (1813–1897), American abolitionist and writer
- Harriet Johnson, multiple people
- Harriet Jones (musician) (born 1993), British singer
- Harriet B. Jones (1856–1943), American physician and politician
- Harriet B. Kells (1842–1913), American educator, activist, suffragist, feminist, editor
- Harriet Keopuolani (1778–1823), Hawaiian queen
- Harriet Byron McAllister (1798–1888), American philanthropist
- Harriet McEwen Kimball (1834–1917), American poet, hymnwriter, philanthropist, hospital co-founder
- Harriet Kemsley (born 1987), English comedian.
- Harriet Kerr (1859–1940) – British suffragette and manager of the Women's Social and Political Union (WSPU)'s headquarters
- Harriet Knowles (fl. 1845), Australian actress
- Harriet Burton Laidlaw (1873–1949), American social reformer and suffragist
- Harriet Lane (1830–1903), First Lady of the United States from 1857 to 1861
- Harriet Nisbet Latta (1853–1910), American civic leader
- Harriet Law (1831–1897), British freethinker
- Harriet Lerner (born 1944), American feminist and clinical psychologist
- Harriet Leve, American theater and movie producer
- Harriet Lindeman (born 1946), Finnish politician
- Harriet Livingston Fulton (1783–1826), Colonial aristocrat and painter
- Harriet Low (1809–1877), American diarist
- Harriet MacGibbon (1905–1987), American actress
- Hattie Mahood (1860–1940), British Baptist deacon and women's suffragist
- Harriet McClintock Marshall (1840–1925), American conductor on the Underground Railroad
- Harriet Gibbs Marshall (1868–1941), African-American musician, writer, and educator
- Harriet Martineau (1802–1876), English writer, feminist philosopher, and political economist
- Harriet McDougal (born 1939), American writer and editor
- Harriet Metcalf (born 1958), American rower
- Harriet Miers (born 1945), American lawyer and politician
- Harriet Taylor Mill (1807–1858), English philosopher and women's rights advocate
- Harriet Mann Miller (1831–1918), American author, naturalist, ornithologist
- Harriet Cornelia Mills (1920–2016), Japanese Chinese scholar
- Harriet May Mills (1857–1935), American politician
- Harriet Monroe (1860–1936), American poet and editor
- Harriet Earhart Monroe (1842–1927), American lecturer, educator, writer, and theater producer
- Harriet Converse Moody (1857–1932), American businesswoman and arts patron
- Harriet Morgan (1830–1907) Australian artist
- Harriet Anderson Stubbs Murphy (1853–1935), British-American artist
- Harriet Mitchell Murphy (1927–2024), African-American judge
- Harriet Nahanee (1935–2007), Canadian Aboriginal rights activist
- Harriet Nāhiʻenaʻena (1815–1836), Hawaiian princess
- Harriet Ndow (1926–2019), Gambian educator
- Harriet Nelson (1909–1994), American singer and actress
- Harriet Noble (1851–1919), American academic and suffragist
- Harriet Hayes Skinner (1817–1893), American writer and editor
- Harriet Wright O'Leary (1916–1999), American teacher and politician
- Harriet Owen (born 1993), British cyclist
- Harriet Pilpel (1911–1991), American attorney and women's rights activist
- Harriet Powers (1837–1910), American female folk artist and quilter
- Harriet Barnes Pratt (1878–1969), American philanthropist, collector, administrator, and horticulturist
- Harriet Waters Preston (1836–1911), American writer and translator
- Harriet Augusta Prunk (1840–1911) American reader, educator, school principal
- Harriet Forten Purvis (1810–1875), American abolitionist
- Harriet Quimby (1875–1912), American aviation pioneer
- Harriet Newell Ralston (1828–1920), American poet
- Harriet Redmond (c.1862–1952), African-American suffragist
- Harriet Roberts, stage name Harriet (born 1966), British dance pop singer
- Harriët van Reek (born 1957), Dutch writer and illustrator
- Harriet Richardson (1874–1958), American carcinologist
- Harriet Hanson Robinson (1825–1911), American suffragist
- Harriet A. Roche (1835–1921), Canadian author
- Harriet Samuel (1836–1908), English businesswoman and founder the jewelry retailer H. Samuel
- Harriet Sansom Harris (born 1955), American actress
- Harriet Schock (born 1941), American singer
- Harriet Scott (born 1972), English radio presenter
- Harriet Scott (born 1993), Irish footballer
- Harriet Anne Scott (1819–1894), English novelist
- Harriet Robinson Scott (c. 1820–1876), African American abolitionist and wife of Dred Scott
- Harriet Smithson (1800–1854), Irish actress and first wife of Berlioz
- Harriet Mabel Spalding (1862–1935), American poet, litterateur
- Harriet Elizabeth Prescott Spofford (1835–1921), American writer
- Harriet Staunton (1841–1877), British murder victim
- Harriet Bradford Tiffany Stewart (1798–1830), American missionary
- Harriet Beecher Stowe (1811–1896), American abolitionist and writer
- Harriet Almaria Baker Suddoth, American writer
- Harriet Anne Thiselton-Dyer (1854–1945), British botanical illustrator
- Harriet Alfarata Thompson (1871–1922), American author
- Harriet Thorpe (born 1957), English actress
- Harriet Toompere (born 1975), Estonian actress
- Harriet Tracy (1834–1918), American inventor
- Harriet Tubman (1822–1913), American abolitionist
- Harriet Taylor Upton (1853–1945), American suffragette and author
- Harriet Vittum (1872–1953), American social reformer
- Harriet Walter, English actress
- Harriet Merrick Warren (1843–1893), American editor
- Harriet Shaw Weaver (1876–1961), Political activist, magazine editor, literary executor of James Joyce
- Harriet Wheeler (born 1963), English rock singer
- Harriet E. Wilson (1825–1900), African-American novelist
- Harriet Wistrich (born 1960), British lawyer and radical feminist
- Harriet Zinnes (1919–2019), American writer
- Harriett Blaisdell (born 1924), American businesswoman and philanthropist
- Harriet Sohmers Zwerling (1928–2019), American writer

=== Animals ===
- Harriet (tortoise), a Galápagos tortoise which had an estimated age of 175 years at the time of her death

== As a surname ==
- Fulchran-Jean Harriet, French painter

== Fictional characters ==
- Mad Harriet, a DC Comics super villain
- Harriet Brindle, a character from the American science fiction sitcom, Small Wonder
- Aunt Harriet Cooper, a character within the DC Universe
- Harriet Jones, British Prime Minister in Doctor Who
- Harriet Schulenburg, character in the British sitcom Green Wing
- Harriet Sims, U.S. Navy officer in the TV show JAG
- Harriet Shelton, police officer in the British soap opera Doctors
- Harriet Vane, fictional mystery author in Dorothy L. Sayers' "Lord Peter" stories
