= Harriet Jones (disambiguation) =

Harriet Jones is a fictional character in British science fiction television series Doctor Who.

Harriet Jones can also refer to:

- Harriet B. Jones (1856–1943), American physician and politician in West Virginia
- Harriet Jones (musician) (active since 2011), British singer and songwriter
- Harriet Jones (swimmer) (born 1997), Welsh swimmer

== See also ==
- Jeannie Mole (born Harriet Fisher Jones, 1841–1912), British socialist and trade union organizer
