= Harriet Cobb =

Harriet Cobb may refer to:

- Harriet Sophia Cobb, New Zealand photographer
- Harriet Redfield Cobb, American mathematics educator
