= Hattie =

Hattie or Hatty is traditionally an English feminine nickname for the name Harriet, long used, however, independently.

It may refer to:

== People ==
- Hattie Alexander (1901–1968), American pediatrician and microbiologist
- Hattie Bessent (1908–2015), American psychiatric nurse
- Hattie Beverly (1874–1904), first African-American schoolteacher in Grand Rapids, Michigan
- Hattie Canty (1933–2012), African-American labor activist
- Hattie Caraway (1878–1950), first female United States senator
- Hattie Carnegie (1889–1956), American clothing and jewelry designer
- Hattie Carthan (1901–1984), community activist in New York
- Hattie Mae Cohens (c. 1963–1992), American lesbian and murder victim
- Hattie Dynevor (born 2003), English actress
- Hattie B. Gooding (1877–1938), American publicity agent
- Hattie Gossett (born 1942), African-American feminist writer
- Hattie Hart (fl. 1928–1934), American Memphis blues singer and songwriter
- Hattie N. Harrison (1928–2013), American politician
- Hattie Hayridge (born 1959), British stand-up comedian and actress
- Hattie Jacques (1922–1980), English comedy actress
- Hattie Johnson (born 1981), American Olympic shooter
- Hatty Jones (born 1988), British child actress in the 1998 movie Madeline
- Hattie Kragten (born 2007), Canadian actress
- Hattie Lawton (c. 1837–?), American Civil War Union spy and detective in Pinkerton's Female Detective Bureau
- Hattie Leslie (allegedly born Libbie Spahn) (1868–1892), American female boxer
- Hattie McDaniel (1895–1952), American actress, first Black performer to win an Academy Award
- Hattie Morahan (born 1978), English actress
- Hatty Nawezhi (born 1994), Belgian basketball player
- Hattie Peterson (1930–2017), a pitcher in the All-American Girls Professional Baseball League
- Hattie Saussy (1890–1978), American painter
- Hattie Williams (1870–1942), American stage actress, comedian and singer
- Hattie Winston (born 1945), American actress best known as Margaret in Becker

== Fictional characters ==
- Hattie Brooks, protagonist of Hattie Big Sky, a children's novel by Kirby Larson
- Hattie Durham, flight attendant in the Left Behind series
- Hattie McDoogal, in the animated television series Futurama
- Hattie Tavernier, in the BBC soap opera EastEnders during the 1990s
- Hattie, protagonist of Hattie and the Wild Waves, a 1990 book by Barbara Cooney
- Hattie, in Live with Yourself!
- Hattie, in Tom's Midnight Garden
- Hattie the Witch, a recurring character in the animated television series Wallykazam!
- Battie Hattie From Cincinnati, a puppet by Larry Smith (puppeteer), also called "Hattie the witch"

== Other ==
- Hattie (film), TV film about Hattie Jacques
- Hattie (elephant) (died 1922), an elephant in New York City's Central Park Zoo

== See also ==
- Hetty (disambiguation), also including Hettie
