= Almaria =

Almaria may refer to:

- Almaria Baker, American politician
- Harriet Almaria Baker Suddoth, American writer
- Prefatio de Almaria, Latin epic poem
- Pachyodes almaria, moth

== See also ==
- Almarian Decker
- Almería
