= Hetty =

Hetty or Hettie is a female first name, often a diminutive form (hypocorism) of Henrietta. Another, less common spelling is Hetti.

Hetty or Hetti may refer to:

== People ==
- Hettie Anderson (1873–1938), born Harriette Dickerson, African-American art model and muse
- Hettie Gray Baker (1880–1957), American film editor
- Hetty Balkenende (born 1939), Dutch former freestyle and synchronized swimmer
- Hettie Vyrine Barnhill, (born 1984), American dancer and choreographer
- Henrietta Hetty Baynes (born 1956), English actress
- Hetty Burlingame Beatty (1907–1971), American sculptor, children's author, and illustrator
- Hetti Bywater (born 1994), English actress
- Hetty Cary (1836–1892), a noted beauty of the Confederacy and one of the makers of the Confederate battle flag
- Hettie Ewing (1896–1986), American missionary in Japan
- Henrietta Hetty Green (1834–1916), American businesswoman and notorious miser
- Hetty Goldman (1881–1972), American archaeologist, the first woman faculty member at the Institute for Advanced Study
- Hettie Inniss (born 1999), British Caribbean artist
- Hetty Johnston (born 1958), Australian child protection activist and founder of the Bravehearts children's charity
- Hettie Jones (born 1934), American poet and writer
- Hettie Judah, British art critic, writer and columnist
- Hetty King (1883–1972), stage name of English music hall entertainer Winifred Emms
- Hetty Krist (born 1942), illustrator
- Hettie Macdonald, British film, theatre and television director
- Hetti Perkins, Aboriginal Australian art curator and writer
- Hetty Perkins (1900–1979), elder of the Arrernte people of central Australia
- Henrietta Tayler (1869–1951), Scottish Jacobite scholar
- Hetty Verolme (born 1930), Belgian-born Australian writer and Holocaust survivor

== Fictional characters ==
- Hetty Birtwisle/Beauchamp, protagonist of the novel What Hetty Did by J. L. Carr
- Henrietta "Hettie" Hubble, the heroine of The New Worst Witch, a sequel television series of The Worst Witch
- Henrietta "Hetty" King, a major character in the television show Road to Avonlea
- Henrietta "Hetty" Lange, from the American television show NCIS: Los Angeles
- Hetty Sorrel, a major character in George Eliot's novel Adam Bede
- Hetty Wainthropp, heroine of the British television series Hetty Wainthropp Investigates
- Henrietta "Hetty" Woodstone, one of the ghosts on the CBS television sitcom Ghosts
- Mad Hettie, in The Sandman comic book universe

== See also ==
- Harriet (name)
