= Henrietta =

Henrietta may refer to:

- Henrietta (given name), a feminine given name, derived from the male name Henry

== Places ==
- Henrietta Island in the Arctic Ocean
- Henrietta, Mauritius
- Henrietta, Tasmania, a locality in Australia

=== United States ===
- Henrietta, Missouri
- Henrietta, Johnson County, Missouri
- Henrietta, New York
- Henrietta, Ohio
- Henrietta, Pennsylvania
- Henrietta, Texas
- Henrietta, West Virginia
- Henrietta, Wisconsin, a county subdivision
  - Henrietta (ghost town), Wisconsin, a ghost town
- Henrietta Township:
  - Henrietta Township, Michigan
  - Henrietta Township, Hubbard County, Minnesota
  - Henrietta Township, Lorain County, Ohio
  - Henrietta Township, LaMoure County, North Dakota

== Fictional characters ==
- Henrietta de Tristain a fictional character from the Japanese light novel/anime Zero no Tsukaima
- Henrietta the coach, a fictional character of The Railway Series
- Henrietta (Gunslinger), a fictional character from the Japanese manga/anime Gunslinger Girl
- Henrietta Coles, the main protagonist of YouTube's online television show Impulse
- Ms. Henrietta Vanderpeen, character on Bear in the Big Blue House
- Henrietta Twombly, a character on Littlest Pet Shop

== Other ==
- 225 Henrietta, an asteroid
- Henrietta (novel), a novel by Charlotte Lennox published in 1758
- Henrietta (film), a 1983 Swedish film based on book of the same name by Stig Claesson
- "Henrietta" (song), a single by the Scottish band The Fratellis
- Henrietta the four-legged chicken, a famous animal with a birth defect
- Henrietta Barnett School, Hampstead Garden Suburb, London, England, a top girls' school
- Nickname for Jon Fishman of the band Phish
- Henrietta Award, a retired Golden Globe Award category given to actors from 1950 to 1979
- Henrietta (ship), yacht schooner designed and built in 1861 by Henry Steers for James Gordon Bennett Jr.

== See also ==
- Henriette (disambiguation)
