= Hetty (disambiguation) =

Hetty or Hettie is a feminine given name. It may also refer to:

- Fredrik Hetty (1905–1992), Norwegian footballer
- Chic Hetti, stage name of pianist Carl Cicchetti (born 1930) of the band The Playmates
- List of storms named Hettie
- Hetty Rock, Livingston Island, Antarctica
- Hetty (vacuum), a vacuum cleaner
