= Harriet Hardy =

Harriet Hardy may refer to:

- Harriet Hardy, birth name of Harriet Taylor Mill (1807–1858), English philosopher and women's rights advocate
- Harriet Louise Hardy (1905–1993), US physician and professor
