= Inniss =

Inniss is a surname. Notable people with the surname include:

- Brandon Inniss (born 2004), American football player
- Clifford Inniss (1910–1998), Barbadian cricketer and judge
- Elton Anthony Carlisle Inniss (1947–2010), one of the Mangrove Nine
- Hettie Inniss (born 1999), British Caribbean artist
- Jennifer Inniss (born 1959), American long jumper and sprinter of Guyanese descent
- Probyn Inniss (born 1936), Governor of Saint Christopher-Nevis-Anguilla and Governor of Saint Christopher and Nevis
- Ryan Inniss (born 1995), English footballer
