= Ruth Wood =

Ruth Wood may refer to:

- Ruth Wood, Countess of Halifax, British racehorse owner
- Ruth Goulding Wood, professor of mathematics
