= Harriet Murphy =

Harriet Murphy may refer to:

- Harriet Mitchell Murphy, African-American judge in Texas
- Harriet Anderson Stubbs Murphy, British-American portrait artist
