= Pachyodes amplificata =

Scientific classification
- Kingdom: Animalia
- Phylum: Arthropoda
- Class: Insecta
- Order: Lepidoptera
- Family: Geometridae
- Genus: Pachyodes
- Species: P. amplificata

Binomial name
- Pachyodes amplificata (Walker, 1862)

Synonyms
- Abraxas amplificata Walker, 1862; Terpna amplificata; Hypochroma abraxas Oberthür, 1913

Species of moth

Pachyodes amplificata is a moth of the family Geometridae first described by Francis Walker in 1862. It is found in China (Hubei, Hunan, Gansu, Guangxi, Anhui, Zhejiang, Fujian, Jiangxi, Sichuan).
