= Henriëtte =

Henriëtte is a Dutch version of the feminine given name Henrietta. The diaeresis is sometimes omitted in foreign texts. People with the name include:

- Henriëtte Amalia of Anhalt-Dessau (1666–1726), mother of John William Friso, Prince of Orange
- Henriëtte Bosmans (1895–1952), Dutch composer
- Aletta Henriëtte Jacobs (1854–1929), Dutch physician and women's suffrage activist
- Henriëtte Geertruida Knip (1783–1842), Dutch flower painter
- Henriëtte van Lynden-Leijten (1950–2010), Dutch diplomat
- Louise Henriëtte van Nassau (1627–1667), daughter of Frederick Henry, Prince of Orange
- Henriëtte Gesina Numans (1877–1955), Dutch painter
- Henriëtte Catharina van Oranje (1637–1708), daughter of Frederick Henry, Prince of Orange
- Henriëtte d'Oultremont de Wégimont (1792–1864), second, morganatic wife of the first Dutch king, William I
- Henriëtte Roland Holst (1869–1952), Dutch poet and socialist
- Henriëtte Ronner-Knip (1821–1909), Dutch-Belgian animal painter
- Henriëtte Roosenburg (1916–1972), Dutch journalist and political prisoner
- Henriëtte Elisabeth de Swart (born 1961), Dutch linguist
- Henriëtte Weersing (born 1965), Dutch volleyball player
- Henriëtte Willebeek le Mair (1889–1966), Dutch illustrator of children's books
- Henriëtte Wolters-van Pee (1692–1741), Dutch miniature painter
