= Pachyodes pratti =

Scientific classification
- Kingdom: Animalia
- Phylum: Arthropoda
- Clade: Pancrustacea
- Class: Insecta
- Order: Lepidoptera
- Family: Geometridae
- Genus: Pachyodes
- Species: P. pratti

Binomial name
- Pachyodes pratti (L. B. Prout, 1927)

Synonyms
- Terpna pratti Prout, 1927

Species of moth

Pachyodes pratti is a moth of the family Geometridae first described by Louis Beethoven Prout in 1927. It is found in Peninsular Malaysia, and on the islands of Sumatra and Borneo. The habitat consists of hill dipterocarp forests and lower montane forests.
