= Pachyodes ornataria =

Scientific classification
- Kingdom: Animalia
- Phylum: Arthropoda
- Class: Insecta
- Order: Lepidoptera
- Family: Geometridae
- Genus: Pachyodes
- Species: P. ornataria

Binomial name
- Pachyodes ornataria Moore, 1888

Synonyms
- Pseudoterpna ornataria; Terpna ornataria

Species of moth

Pachyodes ornataria is a moth of the family Geometridae first described by Frederic Moore in 1888. It is found in India and in the Chinese provinces of Hubei, Hunan, Yunnan, Tibet and Sichuan.
