= Pachyodes leucomelanaria =

Scientific classification
- Kingdom: Animalia
- Phylum: Arthropoda
- Class: Insecta
- Order: Lepidoptera
- Family: Geometridae
- Genus: Pachyodes
- Species: P. leucomelanaria

Binomial name
- Pachyodes leucomelanaria Poujade, 1895

Synonyms
- Archaeopseustes leucomelanaria; Terpna leucomelanaria

Species of moth

Pachyodes leucomelanaria is a moth of the family Geometridae first described by Gustave Arthur Poujade in 1895. It is found in Sichuan, China.
