= Pachyodes =

Scientific classification
- Kingdom: Animalia
- Phylum: Arthropoda
- Class: Insecta
- Order: Lepidoptera
- Family: Geometridae
- Tribe: Pseudoterpnini
- Genus: Pachyodes; Guenée, [1858]

Synonyms
- Archaeopseustes Warren, 1894

Genus of moths

Pachyodes is a genus of moths in the family Geometridae described by Achille Guenée in 1858.

== Species ==
- Pachyodes amplificata (Walker, 1862) (=Hypochroma abraxas Oberthür, 1913)
- Pachyodes haemataria (Herrich-Schäffer, [1854]) (=Pachyodes almaria Guenée, [1858])
- Pachyodes jianfengensis H.X.Han & D.Y.Xue, 2008
- Pachyodes leucomelanaria Poujade, 1895
- Pachyodes novata H.X.Han & D.Y.Xue, 2008
- Pachyodes ornataria Moore, 1888
- Pachyodes pratti (Prout, 1927)
- Pachyodes subtrita (Prout, 1914)
  - Pachyodes subtrita subtrita (Prout, 1914)
  - Pachyodes subtrita simplicior (de Joannis, 1929)
