= Pachyodes jianfengensis =

Scientific classification
- Kingdom: Animalia
- Phylum: Arthropoda
- Clade: Pancrustacea
- Class: Insecta
- Order: Lepidoptera
- Family: Geometridae
- Genus: Pachyodes
- Species: P. jianfengensis

Binomial name
- Pachyodes jianfengensis H.X. Han & D.Y. Xue, 2008

Species of moth

Pachyodes jianfengensis is a moth of the family Geometridae first described by Hong-Xiang Han and Da-Yong Xue in 2008. It is found in Hainan, China.
