= Teviotdale (Linlithgo, New York) =

Historic house in New York, United States

- U.S. National Register of Historic Places
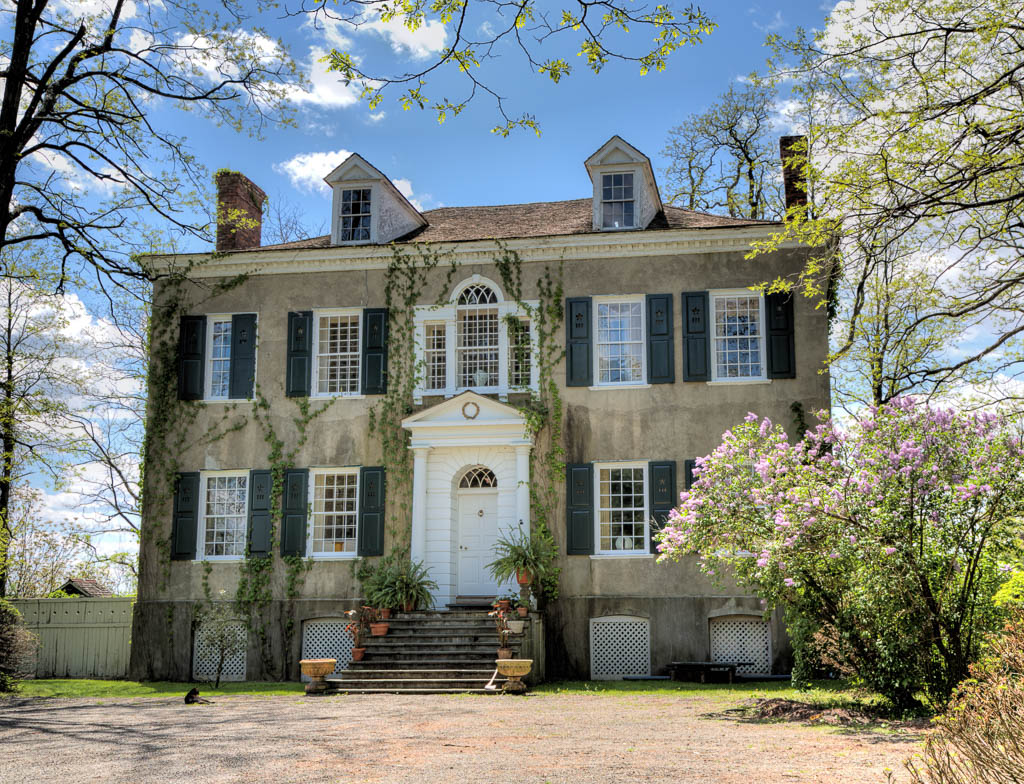

- Location within New York Location within the United States
- Nearest city: Linlithgo, New York
- Coordinates: 42°9′13″N 73°50′26″W
- Area: 4 acres (1.6 ha)
- Built: 1774
- Architect: Livingston, Walter; Sperling, George
- Architectural style: Georgian, Federal
- NRHP reference No.: 79003794
- Added to NRHP: October 10, 1979

Teviotdale is a historic home located at Linlithgo in Columbia County, New York. It was built about 1773 by Walter Livingston (1740–1797). It was added to the National Register of Historic Places in 1979.

== History ==
Walter was the son of Robert Livingston, third and final Lord of Livingston Manor. Upon his death in November 1790, aged eighty-one, Robert broke with the family tradition of leaving the estate to his eldest son and shared Livingston Manor among his five sons. While the eldest, Peter Robert Livingston (1737–1793), inherited "Clermont" proper, Robert devised his land lying east of the Post Road to four of his sons, Walter, Robert C., Henry, and John, each receiving about 28,000 acres; the several lots being located from north to south, along the post-road, in the order named. Each received also a part of the domain to the west of that road. Originally the land was covered with timber, principally pine and oak.

Walter built the "Teviotdale" mansion as a country home, on an elevation, between the Klein and Roeloff Jansen Kills. He died in 1797, and was buried at Trinity Churchyard in New York.

Walter had married his cousin, Gertrude Schuyler sometime prior to 1768. Their youngest daughter Harriet Livingston (1783–1826), married Robert Fulton (1765–1815) in 1806. During their marriage Teviotdale was their country home. After Fulton's death in 1815, Harriet her children, moved to "Teviotdale". She afterwards married Charles Augustus Dale, an Englishman of expensive habits and great fondness for horses. It is related that on one occasion he drove a team of thoroughbreds from New York City to Teviotdale, on a wager that he could make faster time than the steamboat, accomplishing the feat between sunrise and sunset. He won the wager, although at the sacrifice of one of his horses.

At one point, the house came into the possession of Christian Cooper, a former servant of the family, who served in the War of 1812. Christian Cooper died in 1895 aged 110. That same year, his granddaughter Jesse was born to Russell and Jessie Cooper in the Fulton house at Teviotdale. In 1914, she married Antonio Bartolotta; they bought a nearby farm and established Klein Kill's Fruit Farms.

The house was abandoned by the 1920s, but in the 1970s was restored by late interior designer Harrison Cultra and his partner, Richard Barker. It was featured in the June 1980 issue of Architectural Digest.

== Description ==
It is a 2 1/2-story, Georgian / Federal-style structure. It is built of stone and brick. Robert and Harriet Livingston Fulton added a piazza, a central Palladian window on the front facade, and a stucco exterior in the early 1800s.
