= Henrietta Township =

Henrietta Township may refer to the following places in the United States:

- Henrietta Township, Michigan
- Henrietta Township, Hubbard County, Minnesota
- Henrietta Township, Lorain County, Ohio
- Henrietta Township, LaMoure County, North Dakota

== See also ==
- Henrietta (disambiguation)
