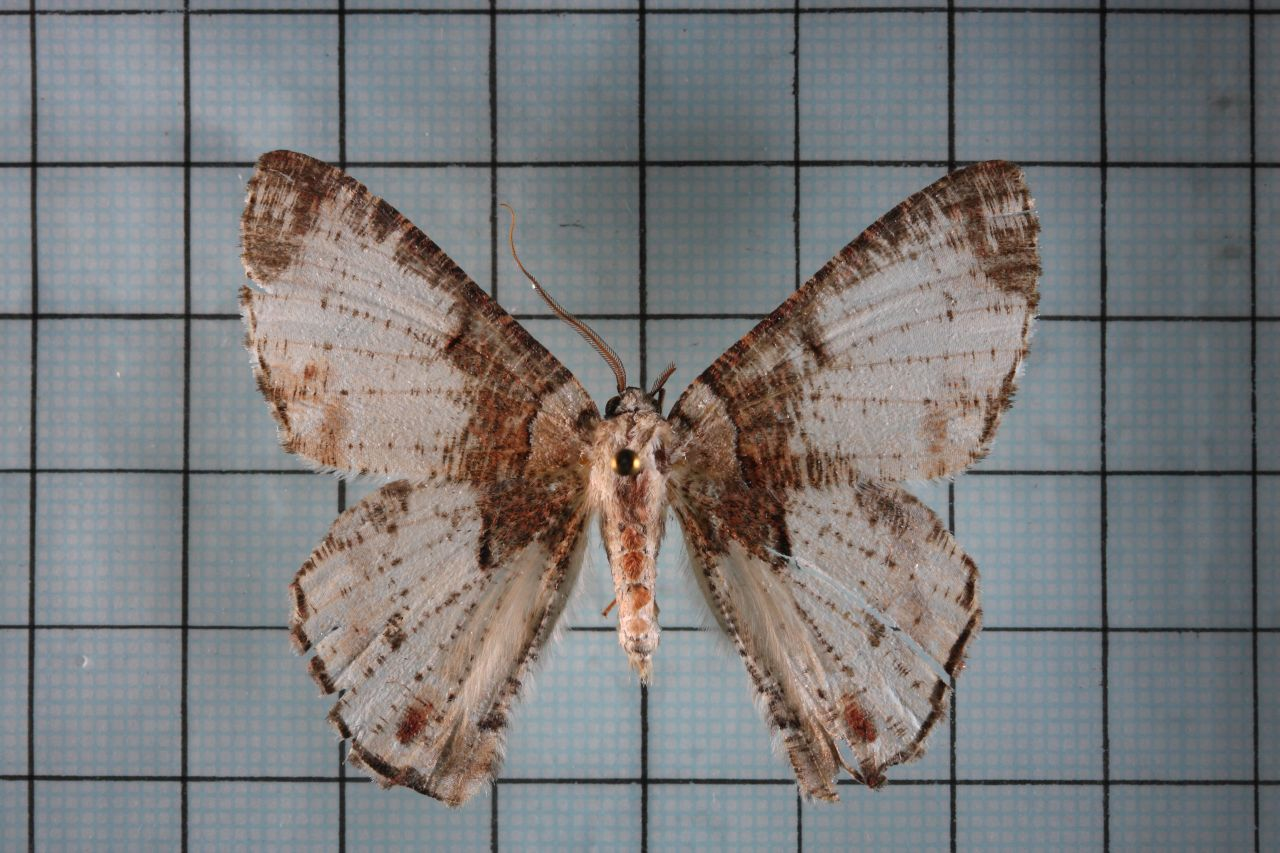

Scientific classification
- Kingdom: Animalia
- Phylum: Arthropoda
- Class: Insecta
- Order: Lepidoptera
- Family: Geometridae
- Genus: Pachyodes
- Species: P. subtritus

Binomial name
- Pachyodes subtritus (L. B. Prout, 1914)

Synonyms
- Pachyodes subtrita; Terpna subtrita Prout, 1914; Terpna simplicior de Joannis, 1929

= Pachyodes subtritus =

Species of moth

Pachyodes subtritus is a moth of the family Geometridae first described by Louis Beethoven Prout in 1914. It is found in China and Taiwan.

== Subspecies ==
- Pachyodes subtrita subtrita (Prout, 1914) (Taiwan)
- Pachyodes subtrita simplicior (de Joannis, 1929) (China)
