= Pachyodes haemataria =

Scientific classification
- Kingdom: Animalia
- Phylum: Arthropoda
- Class: Insecta
- Order: Lepidoptera
- Family: Geometridae
- Genus: Pachyodes
- Species: P. haemataria

Binomial name
- Pachyodes haemataria (Herrich-Schäffer, [1854])

Synonyms
- Terpna haemataria Herrich-Schäffer, [1854]; Pachyodes almaria Guenée, [1858]

Species of moth

Pachyodes haemataria is a moth of the family Geometridae first described by Gottlieb August Wilhelm Herrich-Schäffer in 1854. It is found in India.
