= Harriet Livingston Fulton =

Colonial aristocrat and painter (1783–1826)

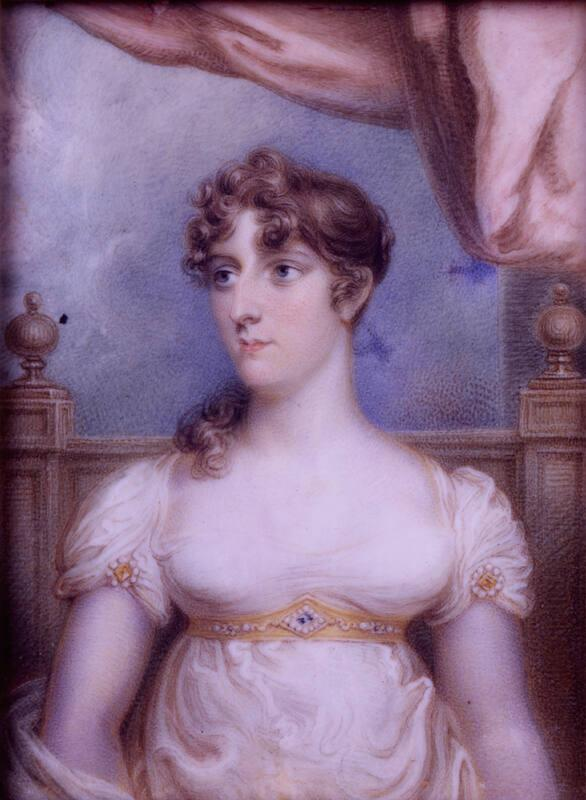
- Watercolor c. 1810–1815
- Born: December 12, 1783; Clermont, New York
- Died: March 24, 1826 (aged 42)
- Resting place: Reformed Dutch Church of Claverack; 42.2291°N 73.7331°W
- Known for: Portrait miniatures
- Spouses: Robert Fulton (m. 1808–1815); Charles Dale (m. 1816–1826)
- Children: 4
- Father: Walter Livingston
- Relatives: Henry W. Livingston (brother); Robert R. Livingston (uncle)
- Family: Livingston family; Schuyler family

Harriet Livingston Fulton (1783–1826) was a painter known for portrait miniatures.

== Biography ==
Harriet Livingston was born on December 12, 1783, in the family home in Clermont, New York to Cornelia Schuyler and Walter Livingston. Cornelia and Walter's great-grandparents, Alida Schuyler and Pieter Schuyler respectively, had been siblings – making Harriet's parents cousins. The Livingstons belonged to a well-established family whose direct ancestry included important early American figures like Robert Livingston the Elder, Philip Pieterse Schuyler, and Rip Van Dam.

Walter Livingston, Harriet's father, organized the construction of Teviotdale House in Clermont, New York, in 1774 after purchasing 28,000 acres of land from his father. He designed the home himself, creating one of the first American homes oriented specifically for the best view and sunlight. As the house was being constructed, Walter was serving on the Committee of Sixty to boycott British goods in the American colonies. He became the first speaker of the New York State Assembly in 1777 and served as a member of the Continental Congress in 1784, soon after Harriet's birth. In 1790, when Harriet was six years old, George and Martha Washington visited Teviotdale for tea, and Martha stayed overnight in one of the home's three bedrooms.

Harriet studied art and music from a young age, becoming an accomplished painter and harpist by her early 20s.

=== Marriage to Robert Fulton ===
In the early 1800s, Harriet's uncle Robert R. Livingston met inventor Robert Fulton while working as the US Ambassador to France in Paris. Robert R. Livingston was one of three signatories of the Louisiana Purchase while on the same assignment. Soon after returning to New York, Livingston introduced his unmarried niece to his new business partner and the two quickly began seeing each other. As Harriet herself was a painter and Fulton had spent many years studying painting under Benjamin West in Europe before he had become an inventor, the two were a fast pairing.

Robert Fulton and Robert R. Livingston worked together on the Hudson River to launch America's first commercially successful steamboat on August 8, 1807. A route that had previously taken a week by sloop suddenly took only 32 hours to navigate with the North River Steamboat. The vessel set off from New York City, briefly stopped by Teviotdale, and continued up the Hudson before arriving in Albany. Harriet likely accompanied Fulton on this excursion, as the two are said to have taken advantage of the excitement of the event to announce their recent engagement to their friends and family members. A contemporary newspaper article recorded a conversation between Robert R. Livingston and Robert Fulton, in which the latter asked the former if it would be presumptuous of him to "aspire for the hand of Harriet Livingston." Livingston is said to have responded:

"By no means, her father may object because you are a humble and poor inventor, and the family may object, but if Harriet does not object – and she seems to have a world of good sense – go ahead, and my best wishes and blessings go with you."

— Robert R. Livingston

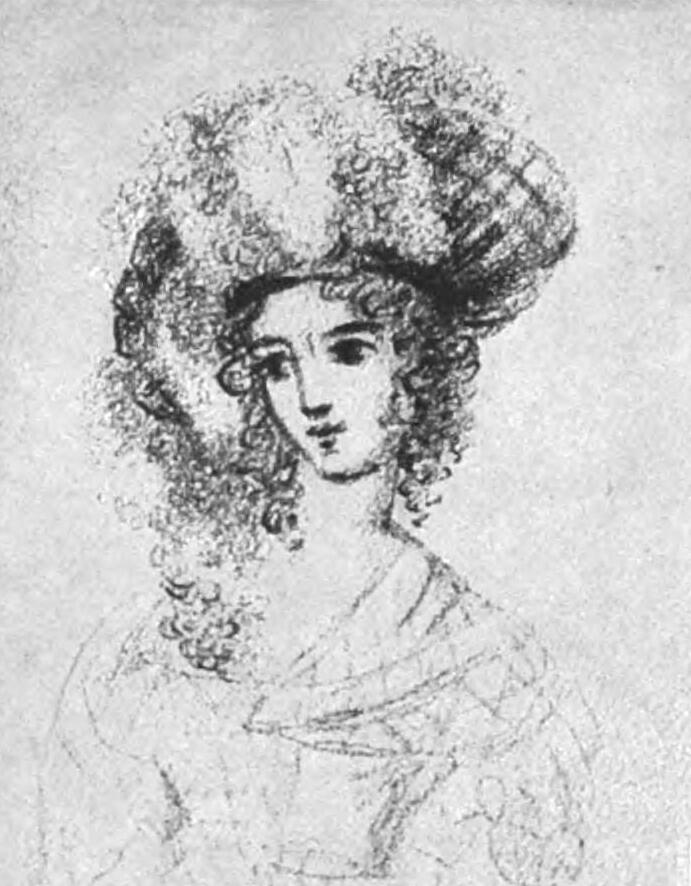
Julia Fulton Blight, sketch by Harriet Livingston Fulton, c. 1825.

Harriet and Robert were married in front of the fireplace in Teviotdale on June 8, 1808. At the time of their marriage, Robert was 42 and Harriet was 24. They spent several weeks at Teviotdale following their wedding, painting and enjoying each other's company. The pair eventually had four children: one son and three daughters, the first of whom was born later that year. Their eldest daughter, Julia Fulton Blight, eventually followed in her parents' footsteps by becoming a painter, though she quit the arts entirely in 1831 following her marriage to Charles Blight of Philadelphia.

- Robert Barlow Fulton (1808–1841).
- Julia Fulton (1810–1848), wife of lawyer Charles Blight.
- Cornelia Livingston Fulton (1812–1893), wife of lawyer Edward Charles Crary.
- Mary Livingston Fulton (1813–1861), wife of Robert Morris Ludlow.

During the seven years of their marriage, Robert Fulton was credited with seventeen boats that brought the couple significant wealth, including the first torpedo boat, the first steam war frigate, and the first steam ferries. In one of Harriet's only surviving letters, she writes to her uncle Robert Livingston bemoaning Robert's constant work schedule. At the time of writing, Harriet was well into her third pregnancy and she was openly frustrated with how little time Robert was spending with the family. She complained sarcastically that her husband, referred to as simply "Fulton," had accidentally given away money that was meant for her, in his "good nature and thoughtless way."

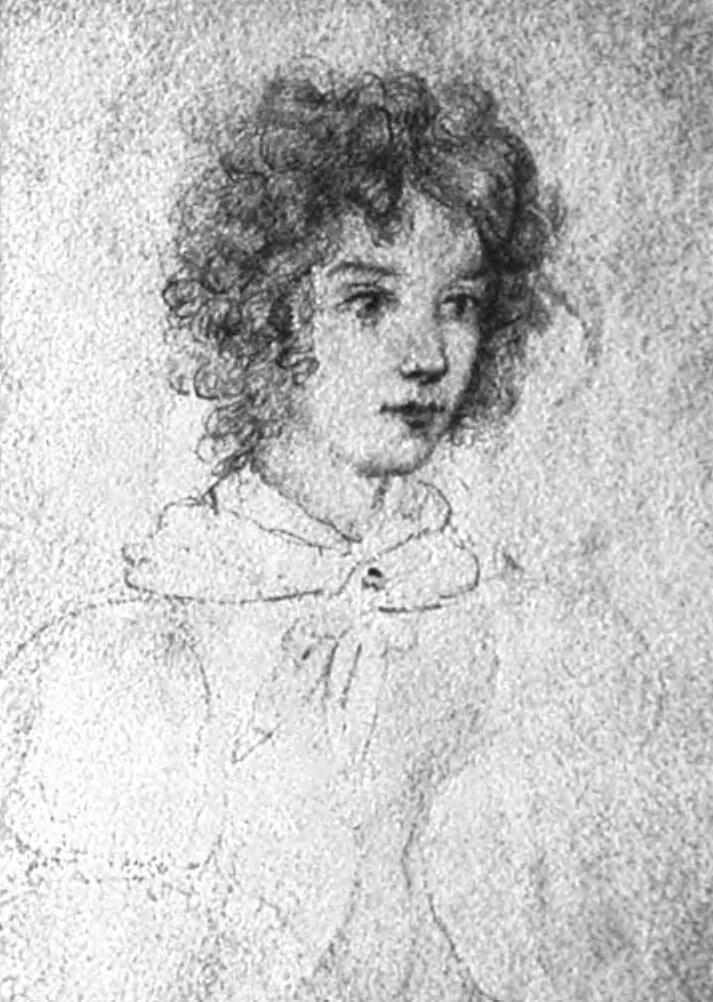
Cornelia Livingston Fulton, sketch by Harriet Livingston Fulton, c. 1820.

While walking home on the frozen Hudson River, one of Fulton's friends, Thomas Addis Emmet, is said to have fallen through the ice. Robert jumped to the rescue, saving Emmet but soaking himself in ice water in the process. Fulton caught pneumonia as a result of his heroics and died of "consumption" on February 24, 1815, at the age of 49. He was buried in the Livingston family vault at Trinity Church Cemetery, near Alexander Hamilton and Albert Gallatin.

As a result of Robert's death in 1815, Harriet was left as the sole parent to four children, aged two, three, five and seven. Robert Fulton prepared a will and testament for use in the event of his death on December 13, 1814. He designated all of his possessions and $9,000 a year to Harriet for the remainder of her life, and $500 a year to each of his children while they were under 12, followed by $1,000 a year until they turned 21. This meant that Harriet, the children's financial guardian, received $11,000 (equivalent to $212,000 in 2022) a year for the first five years after Robert's death, and $11,500 ($221,000 in 2022) a year from 1820 until her subsequent death in 1826.

=== Later life ===
Harriet married Charles Augustus Dale on November 26, 1816, a year and a half after Robert Fulton's death. Said to be a man of expensive taste with a particular affinity for horses, many stories about Charles Dale recount him racing his thoroughbred horses against steamboats from New York City to Teviotdale. Shortly after their marriage, Dale took Harriet back to England with him and proceeded to spend what remained of her fortune.

Harriet Livingston Fulton Dale died in England on March 24, 1826, when she was 42. Her final request was for her body to be shipped back to her family in New York. Rather than be buried in the Livingston family vault at Trinity Church alongside Robert Fulton, Harriet was laid to rest beneath a marble obelisk in the cemetery of the Reformed Dutch Church of Claverack. Though her second husband was not buried in the same cemetery and she remains best known as Harriet Livingston Fulton, she was buried under the name Harriet Livingston Dale. Her daughter Mary Fulton Ludlow (1813–1861) and grandson Robert Fulton Ludlow (1846–1930) are her only relatives in the cemetery.

== Legacy ==
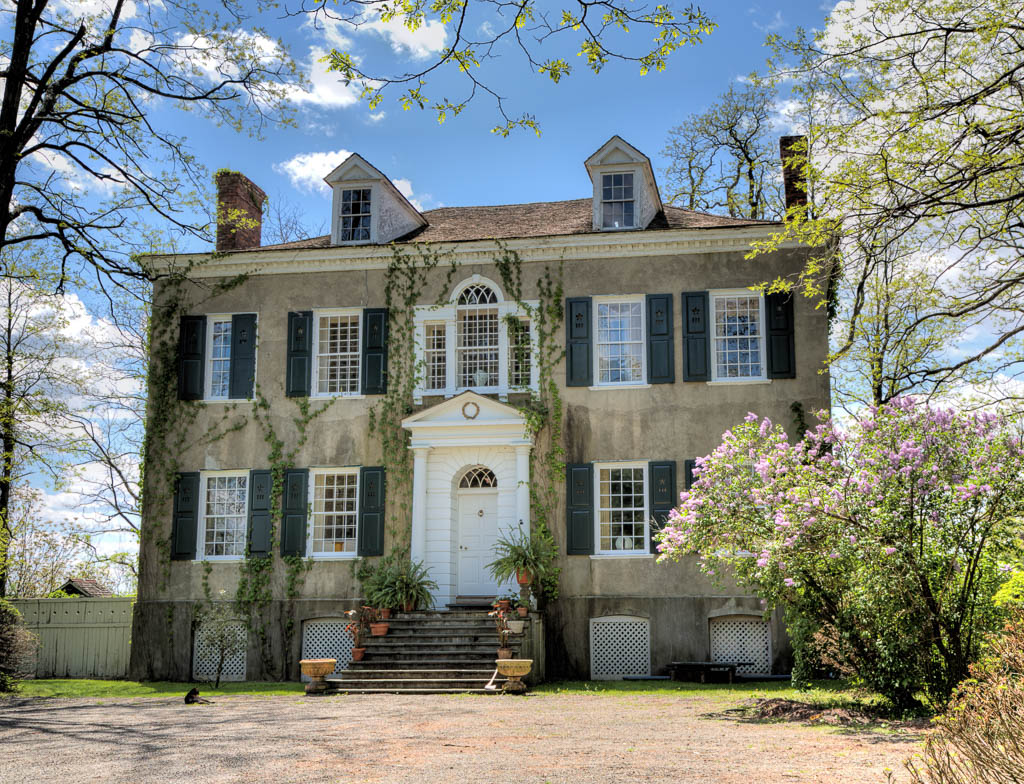
Teviotdale, post-restoration.

During her first marriage, Harriet and Robert had cared for the Teviotdale House while using it as their summer home. Following Robert's death, Harriet and the children moved to the house permanently until her second husband chose to mortgage the property for $10,000 in 1820. After Harriet lost the house it had numerous owners throughout the mid-to-late 1800s before the property fell into near-total disrepair by the 1930s. The building was fully restored, refurnished, and equipped with modern heating, electricity, and plumbing by interior designers Harrison Cultra and Richard Barker in the 1970s. As the house had significantly deteriorated by that time, the pair relied on a single drawing created by Harriet (c. 1825) of the house's original design to achieve authenticity in their restoration. Teviotdale was officially added to the National Register of Historic Places on October 10, 1979.

=== Pop culture ===
Playwright Rida Johnson Young produced one of her most popular plays, Little Old New York, in 1920. The stage production was a fictionalized account of the life of Harriet's first husband, Robert Fulton, and it ran for more than three hundred performances at Plymouth Theatre between September 8, 1920, and June 4, 1921. Twenty years later in 1940, 20th Century-Fox premiered a black-and-white film version of Little Old New York, directed by Henry King. This iteration marked the first appearance of a Harriet Livingston character, played by actress Brenda Joyce. The role of Robert Fulton was played by Richard Greene.
