= Harriet Ndow =

Gambian Educator (born 1926)

Harriet Martha Ndow
- Born: Harriet Martha Ndow; October 28, 1926; Banjul, The Gambia
- Died: June 18, 2019 (aged 91)
- Occupation: Educationist

Harriet Margaret Ndow (née Njie) (born October 28, 1926 ) was a Gambian educator and educational entrepreneur. Ndow dedicated her life to education, leadership, and youth development which left an indelible mark on the community

== Early life and education ==
Ndow was born in 1926 as the first daughter of the shop owner William Njie and Elizabeth Njie. She belonged to the Wolof ethnic group and was Catholic. She had her primary and secondary education at St. Joseph's Infant Primary and Secondary schools. After graduating from school in 1945, she went to Achimota College in the Gold Coast (now Achimota School in Ghana ) with a scholarship to train as a primary school teacher. She successfully completed her studies in 1948 and returned home to begin her career as a qualified teacher at St. Joseph's Primary School in Banjul. In 1955, she was awarded another scholarship to attend Portsmouth Training College in the United Kingdom, where she specialised in leadership in primary education. Her dedication to advancing her expertise led her to further studies at Oxford University, where she focused on teaching reading and mathematics in primary schools, as well as school management.

== Career ==
Ndow began her teaching career 1948 as a qualified teacher at St. Joseph's Primary School in Banjul.In 1963, Harriet's passion for education and leadership culminated in the opening of Kampama School, where she served as the head teacher.Her leadership and commitment to excellence in education led to her promotion in 1966 to Serrekunda Primary School, where she served as head teacher until her retirement in 1981. In the 1980s, with the support of the government and a World Bank loan of over $7 million, she founded several of her own schools, first the St. Joseph Nursery School and then secondary schools. In 2009, eight schools were part of their Ndow's Group of Schools. Among them is the Ndow's Comprehensive Senior Secondary School in Bakau New Town with 575 students from grades 10 to 12 (as of 2009).

== Awards ==
In 2014 she received a Lifetime Achievement Award from the Gambia Chamber of Commerce and Industry (GCCI).

== Personal life ==
Ndow was married to Chips Ndow.
