= Harriet Elphinstone-Dick =

English-Australian swimming champion and physical fitness teacher

Harriet Elphinstone-Dick (1852–1902), also known as Harriet Elizabeth Rowell, was an early English and Australian swimming champion, and physical fitness teacher.

Originally from Brighton, England, she taught swimming at Brill's Baths in Pool Valley and won local fame with a series of public swimming feats including a 2-hour 43 minute swim in a rough September sea from Shoreham to Brighton.

In 1875, she migrated to Melbourne, Australia aboard the Newcastle with her partner, Alice Moon, and started to teach swimming at the St Kilda Sea Baths, while also winning prizes in swimming competitions at various venues around Melbourne’s Port Phillip Bay.

She had an intense interest in physical fitness and in 1879 opened Melbourne's first women's only gymnasium, in the Queen Victoria Building, which used to stand where the Melbourne City Square is now. Physical fitness for women was a popular idea of the 1880s and the gym attracted many of Melbourne's independent career women, particularly teachers from the city's growing number of private girls' schools. Miss Dick taught the Swedish Ling Method and ran her gym until 1901.

Miss Dick and Miss Moon lived at the Melbourne suburb of Brighton. She died at home in South Brighton in 1902 and was buried in the Cheltenham Cemetery.

In 2019, Sue Ingleton's book, Making Trouble: Tongued with fire: An Imagined History of Harriet Elphinstone Dick and Alice C. Moon, was published by Spinifex Press.
