= List of storms named Hettie =

The name Hettie has been used for three tropical storms in the South Pacific Ocean.

- Cyclone Hettie (1982)
- Cyclone Hettie (1992)
- Cyclone Hettie (2009)
