= Hattie Saussy =

American painter

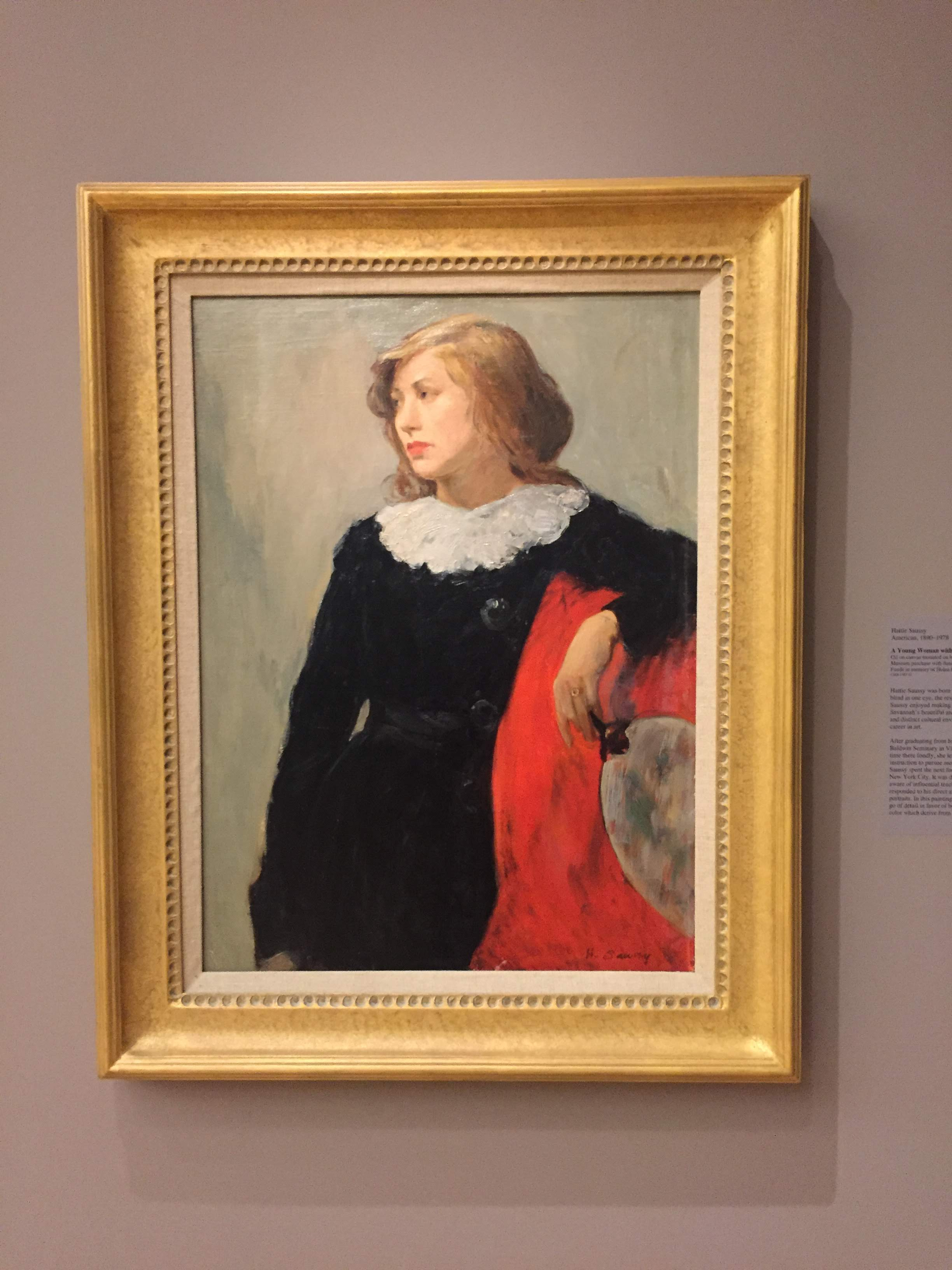
Hattie Saussy's A Young Woman with Fan (c. 1930) displayed in the Columbia Museum of Art

Hattie Saussy (1890 – 1978) was a painter from Savannah, Georgia. In her youth, she studied at the Telfair Academy of Arts and Sciences, where she learned about Impressionist art. She later studied for a year at Mary Baldwin Seminary, the National Academy of Design Antique School, and the New York School of Fine and Applied Art.

Saussy's work includes landscapes and portraiture. It can be found in several Southeastern museums such as the Columbus Museum, the High Museum of Art, the Telfair Museum, the Ogden Museum of Southern Art, and the Spartanburg Art Museum.

Throughout her life, Saussy comprised 38 original works of art that were selected from 19 private and institutional collections throughout the United States.

Saussy, an American painter, whose work is characterized by the integration of Impressionist elements within a Realist framework, formulating her own unique painting aesthetic. This approach combined traditional composition with stylistic techniques that diverged from strict Realism, resulting in a distinct aesthetic within American painting.

== Early life ==
Hattie Saussy was born to Rachel Louise Shivers and Joachim Radcliffe Saussy III on March 17, 1890, and was their only child to live to advanced age. Saussy came to age during a time of dramatic growth and activity in the Savannah art community, being born just a few years after the Telfair Academy of Arts and Sciences, now the Telfair Museums, was opened in 1886. Over the next few decades, more opportunities for private art lessons began to appear and be incorporated in Savannah's public schools in 1915 by Lila Cabaniss. She was introduced to art and painting in her fifth-grade public school, and went on to take private lessons. Saussy left Savannah after high school, in 1906, for college at the Mary Baldwin College in Virginia. This is where her passion for art really took off.

During her year in Virginia, Saussy attended classes and studied both still life drawing as well as en plein air painting. Saussy especially enjoyed studying en plein air. While she was studying in Virginia, Saussy's work was chosen to be displayed at the Jamestown Tercentennial Exposition (Jamestown Exposition.

Because her parents were both from prominent local families, they were able to grant Saussy the financial independence that she needed to study in New York and abroad. During this time Saussy was able to pursue her artistic practice without having to rely on the sales of her work. This means that Saussy didn't sell her work and only exhibited it, this caused her not to receive as much recognition as she could have during this time. Saussy ended up comprising 38n original art pieces that were selected from 19 private and institutional collections throughout the United States to be exhibited. Saussy then left Baldwin after one year and moved to New York with her widowed mother in 1907. During her time there she enrolled at the New York School of Fine and Applied Art (Parsons School of Design), the National Academy of Design, and the Art Students League of New York. They spent four years in New York, and Saussy studied art with many different professors at the National Academy of Design and at the Art Students' League under the instructors Rae Sloan Bredin, George Bridgman, Frank DuMond, Eliot O'Hara, and Eugene Speicher. After New York she and her mother moved to Paris, where they stayed until World War 1 started in 1913 until 1914.

== Adult life ==
In Paris, Saussy studied watercolors and oils with E. A. Taylor. Saussy would travel the continent and while doing so she would create watercolor paintings as well as a few oil paintings to document her travels abroad. Upon her return to the United States, she divided her time between Savannah, New York, and Washington where she worked for the government from 1915 until the end of World War I. Following the war, Saussy spent the remainder of her life in Savannah, where she became a founding member and eventual president (1933–1934) of the Association of Georgia Artists. Although Saussy was to spend the remainder of her life in Savannah, she spent one year teaching at Chatham Episcopal Institute (Chatham Hall). After that one year she returned to Savannah where she lived for the rest of her life. During one of her en plein air painting trips outdoors, Saussy suffered from a broken hip and was largely confined to her home in Savannah. She was also a member of the Savannah Arts Association and the Southern States Art League. Saussy embraces an emphasis on the momentary effects of color and light in her paintings, which identifies her as one of the South's leading impressionists.

== Artwork ==
- Landscape with Sailboat at Bonaventure
- Path with Mossy Trees
- Wisteria
- Sunday Afternoon in Savannah
- The Footbridge
