= Henriette =

Henriette may refer to:

== People ==
=== Nobles ===
Ordered chronologically

- Henriette, Countess of Montbéliard (1387–1444), Sovereign Countess of Montbéliard
- Henriette of Cleves (1542–1601), Duchess of Nevers, Countess of Rethel and Princess of Mantua
- Henriette Marie of the Palatinate (1626–1651), daughter of Elizabeth Stuart, Queen of Bohemia
- Princess Henriette Adelaide of Savoy (1636–1676), Electress of Bavaria
- Henriette Louise de Bourbon (1703–1772), French princess and abbess
- Henriette of France (1727–1752), French princess, daughter of King Louis XV

=== Other ===
Ordered alphabetically

- Dianette Henriette-Manan, Mauritian politician
- Henriette Chandet (1901-1989), French feminist, columnist, and historian
- Henriette Willemina Crommelin (1870-1957), Dutch labor leader and temperance reformer
- Henriette Delamarre de Monchaux (1854–1911), French naturalist, geologist and paleontologist
- Henriette DeLille (1813–1862), Louisiana Creole nun and founder of the Sisters of the Holy Family in New Orleans
- Henriette Dibon (1902–1989), French poet and short story writer
- Henriette Hansen (disambiguation)
- Henriette Homann (1819–1892), Norwegian photographer and painter
- Henriette Krebs (born 1985), German politician
- Henriette Tabita Hutabarat Lebang (born 1952), Indonesian religious leader and former the General Chairperson of the Communion of Churches in Indonesia
- Henriette Löfman (1784–1836), Swedish composer
- Henriette Mankiewicz (1852-1906), art embroiderer
- Henriette Mathieu-Faraggi (1915–1985), French nuclear physicist, the first woman to lead the Société Française de Physique
- Henriette Nissen-Saloman (1819–1879), Swedish opera singer
- Henriette Perrin-Duportal (1869-1938), French historian, writer, author of children’s books and school textbooks, friend of Marie Curie, married to Jean Perrin
- Henriette Petit (1894–1983), Chilean painter
- Henriette Pressburg (1788–1863), mother of Karl Marx
- Henriette Reker (born 1956), German politician and first woman to be mayor of Cologne
- Henriette Sauret (1890–1976), French feminist, author, pacifist, journalist
- Henriette Strobel (born 1953), Dutch singer and model
- Henriette Yvonne Stahl (1900–1984), Romanian novelist, short story writer and translator
- Henriette Widerberg (1796–1872), Swedish opera singer
- Henriette Wienecke Stadfeldt (1819–1907), Norwegian-Danish composer
- Henriette Wulfsberg (1843–1906), Norwegian school owner and writer

== Other uses ==
- Henriette, Minnesota
- Hurricane Henriette (disambiguation)
- La fête à Henriette, a 1952 French film often known simply as Henriette

== See also ==
- Henrietta (disambiguation)
