= Harriet Glanville =

American amateur golfer

Harriet Glanville (August 23, 1927 – January 1, 2012) was an American amateur golfer and physical education teacher from Long Beach, California.

Glanville was born in 1927 in Mason City, Iowa. She moved to Long Beach in 1938 and graduated from Long Beach Poly High School before attending UCLA and Long Beach State University.

While employed as a school teacher, she played in the inaugural California Women’s Amateur Championship at Pebble Beach Golf Links where she earned medalist honors in 1967. She also played in the U.S. Women's Open as an amateur. Glanville is a six-time winner of the Long Beach Women's Golf Championship and inducted into the Long Beach Golf Hall of Fame in 2000.
