= Henriette Krebs =

German politician (born 1985)

Member of the Landtag of Saxony-Anhalt
- Incumbent
- Assumed office 6 October 2026

Personal details
- Born: 29 August 1985 (age 41)
- Party: Die Linke

Henriette Krebs (born 29 August 1985) is a German politician who was elected member of the Landtag of Saxony-Anhalt in 2026. She has served as co-chair of Die Linke in the Salzlandkreis since 2019. From 2017 to 2019, she served as managing director of Die Linke in Saxony-Anhalt.
