= Harriet Tracy =

American inventor (1834–1918)

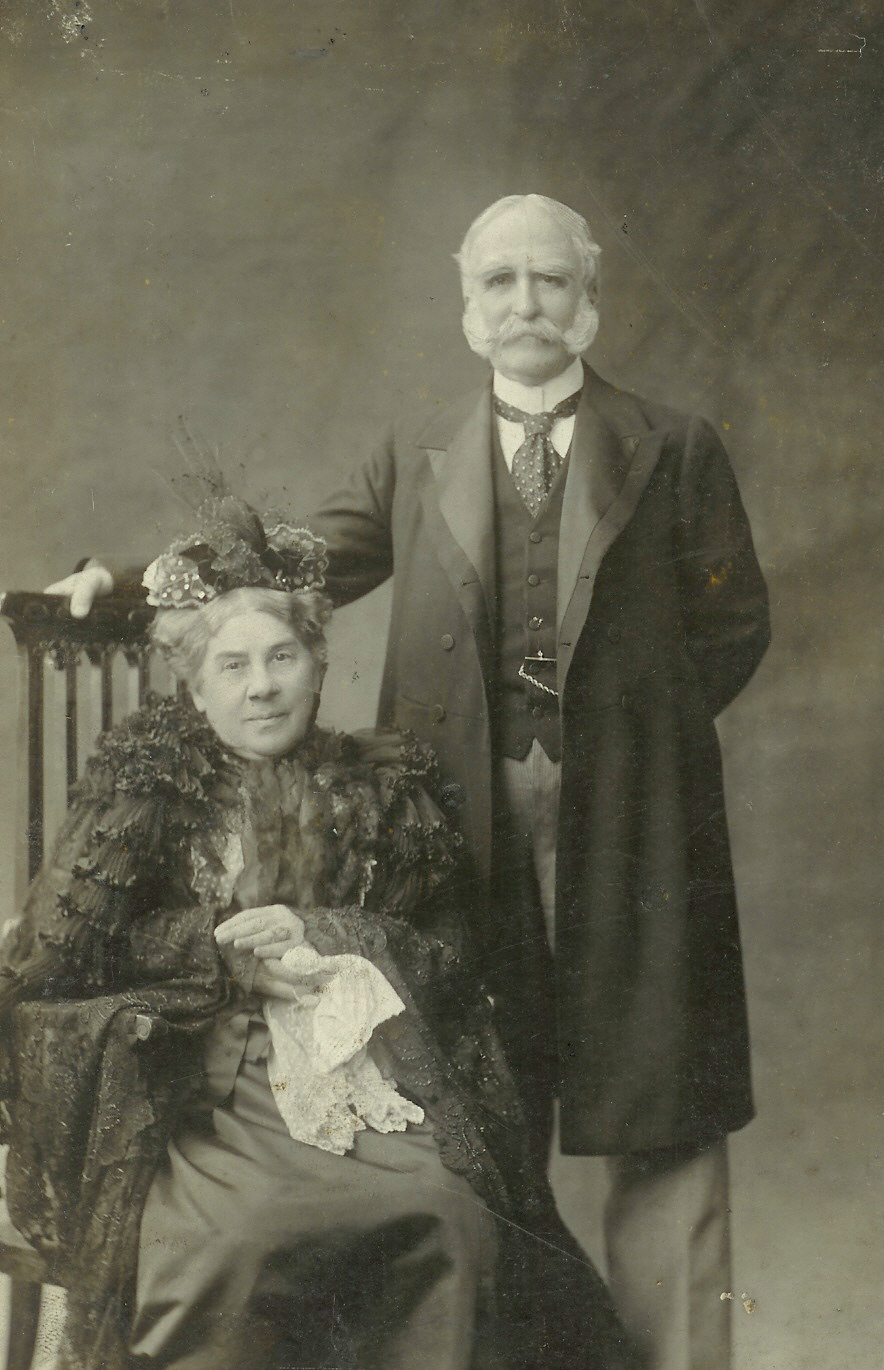
- Born: Harriet Ruth Brisbane; December 6, 1834; Charleston, NC.
- Died: May 30, 1918 (84 years old); Brentford, England
- Notable work: Tracy Gravity Safety Elevator

Harriet Ruth Brisbane Tracy (1834–1918) was an American inventor who is credited to have received 27 patents from 1868 to 1915. These patents were in a multitude of fields such as elevators, sewing machines, and crib attachments. Of the 27 patents, six were for elevators and seventeen were for sewing machines. Ten of these patents came during a very productive period from 1890 to 1893. Of her inventions, the most renowned was her Tracy Gravity Safety Elevator. This system was designed to address the pain point of inefficiencies and frequent accidents in elevator systems at the time. This innovation was first installed and recognised in the Women's Building at the Chicago World's Columbian Exposition. Tracy’s other notable innovations were her sewing machines and crib attachments. One demonstration of Tracy's ability to adapt and her knack for innovation are her multiple other contributions, for example her contributions to innovation in folding beds. She died on May 30, 1918, at the age of 83; according to her obituary she was also "gifted as a writer of verse and prose", contributing frequently to "magazines and periodicals."

== Personal life ==
Harriet Ruth Tracy was born on December 6, 1834, in Charleston, South Carolina; her parents were William Brisbane (1809–1860) and Julia Hall Lowndes (1811–1847). The noted abolitionist William Henry Brisbane (1806–1878) was her first cousin once removed.

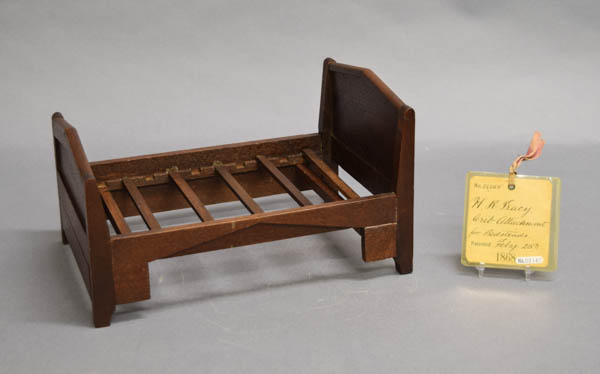
Patent Model – Improved Crib-Attachment for Bedsteads, 1868, Patent Number 74,865, Hagley Museum and Library, Wilmington, DE

In 1860 she married Cadwallader Colden Tracy (1830–1921), a baseball player who had been a member the New York Knickerbockers in 1854.She then moved to Staten Island, in the village of New Brighton, to live with her husband in 1860. Tracy and her husband had four daughters. In 1890 Tracy and her family moved to Paris, France, and then to London, England.

== Inventions ==
One demonstration of Harriet Tracy's adaptability and her knack for innovation is the versatility of her inventions. With regards to the pain points Tracy aimed to address, many of them surrounded issues with uban living spaces and making them more efficient. Her life time was post-Industrial Revolution, and as such, adapting to the growing consumer needs for industrial efficiency was essential, and she was a front-liner in this effort. Tracy's first innovation was a patent for a crib attachment for bedsteads in 1868. The innovation solved a problem that crib owners had been experiencing: the crib disrupting the appearance of the parent’s bedroom. The invention furnished an improved bedstead and crib that was designed in a way that when it’s not in use can present a neat and uniform appearance, giving no indication of the presence of the crib-attachment.

Another one of Tracy’s prominent innovations was her lock-stitch and chain-stitch sewing machine. This sewing machine was so impressive, for its time, because “her improved bobbin which held up to 1,000 yards of thread hence reducing the number of times the bobbin thread had to be replaced, making it a time saver”. These sewing machines were used in both industrial and domestic settings.

Tracy’s most prominent innovation was her Tracy Gravity Safety Elevator. The invention increased the safety measures of elevators by installing automatic platforms that kept the elevator shaft constantly closed, preventing any person falling through it. This innovation was so groundbreaking, for its time, that it was installed in Women’s Building at the World's Columbian Exposition in Chicago, where “it was used to transport visitors to the roof-top restaurant.” It was also commercialised in New York City. The pain point that Tracy addressed with this innovation was the recurring failures occurring with elevator systems at the time. With this innovation, she made this process easier for the every-day consumer in a time at which these inventions were making their way in to commercial and residential spaces.

Tracy also received a patent for a cooking stove, and a fire escape, which she described in her 1883 patent application as a "simple, cheap, durable, compact, and efficient fire-escape ladder which may be folded into a small compass."

== Death and legacy ==
Tracy, died on May 30, 1918, aged 83. According to her obituary she was also "gifted as a writer of verse and prose", contributing frequently to "magazines and periodicals." Tracy was well known for her inventions during the late nineteenth century and was one of the first prominent American female innovators. In the nineteenth century, woman made up just 1% of all inventors who received United States patents. Unfortunately, little is known about most of these women, but Tracy is an exception. Tracy received much notoriety and fame for her innovations. So much so that many of her inventions received extensive public acclaim in Chicago newspapers. For example, “The Chicago Mail said about her sewing machine: ‘All ladies who see the machine are delighted with it and her other meritorious inventions are proud that a woman has accomplished what man failed to do….’” Many of Tracy’s inventions were also showcased in expositions, such as her lock-stitch and chain-stitch sewing machine which was shown at Chicago Columbian Exposition, in the Liberal Arts Building. Despite being renowned, in her time for her innovations, she has mostly been forgotten about in modern times; there are very few books or other materials dedicated to her accomplishments. Despite this, Harriet Tracy's work in her field created a legacy that goes far beyond the span of her life.

Moreover, Harriet Tracy is an inspiring figure for women and girls who are looking into pursuing STEM careers. During the Columbian Exhibition where her gravity elevator was displayed, "she was among a number of women whose inventions were displayed, and sold." Harriet Tracy decided to use her creative expertise combined with her vast knowledge of different fields to innovate in a way that was not popular at the time. But this did not stop Tracy, as she made a presence for herself in fields where women were undermined and were thought to have a lack of expertise.

Harriet Tracy worked in a largely male-dominated field and established a reputation through her inventions and technical work. Her career reflects the challenges faced by women innovators of the period and their contributions to industrial and technological development. Recognition of Tracy’s work highlights the broader role played by women inventors in the history of innovation.

== Collections ==
Patent Model – Improved Crib-Attachment for Bedsteads, February 25, 1868, Hagley Museum and Library
