= Hetty Athon Morrison =

Indiana writer (1837–1885)

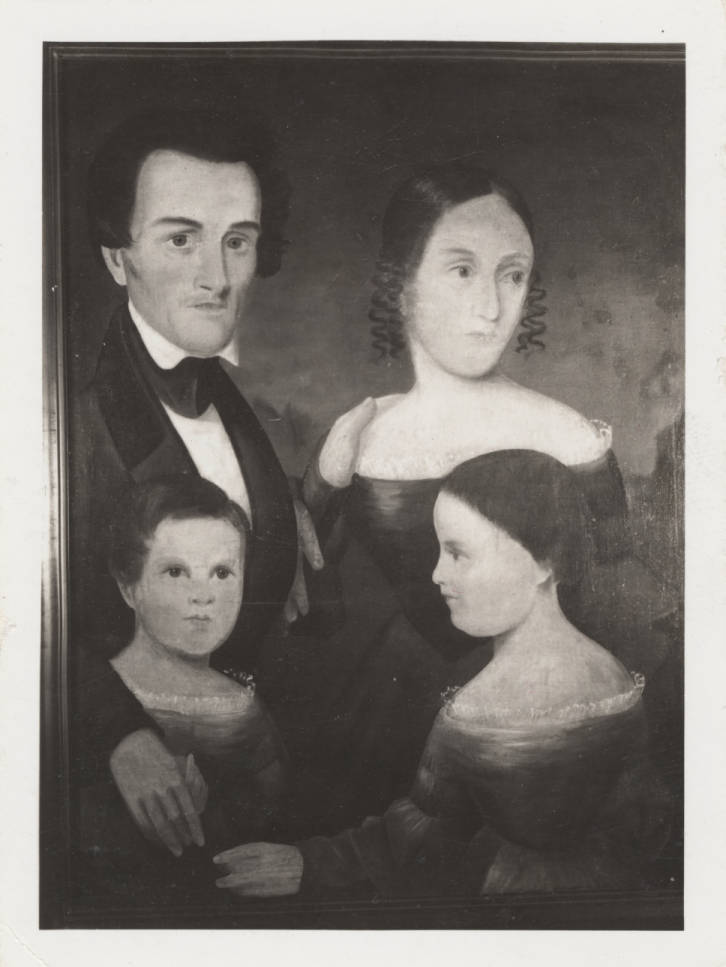
- portrait of Henrietta Athon, her sister, and her parents, c. 1844, attributed to Richard Terrell
- Born: May 4, 1837; Charlestown
- Died: March 4, 1885
- Occupation: Writer
- Father: James S. Athon

Henrietta Wilson Athon Morrison (May 4, 1837 – March 4, 1885) was an American writer from Indiana.

Hetty Athon Morrison was born on May 4, 1837 in Charlestown, Indiana. She was the daughter of Dr. James S. Athon, a physician and politician who served as Secretary of State of Indiana, and Rebecca Carr Athon. She and her sister Marietta were educated at the McLean Female Seminary and the Maplewood Institute in New England. Henrietta married James B. Morrison in 1858, while Marietta married General Jefferson C. Davis.

Beginning from a young age, Morrison frequently published poetry and essays in newspapers and periodicals. She was one of the founders of the Indianapolis Woman's Club in 1875.

Morrison published a single book, My Summer in the Kitchen (1878). It is not a cookbook, but a series of essays in which Morrison explores societal gender roles. In one passage, Morrison writes:

The cunning of the serpent was nothing to that of man when he founded the institution of the kitchen and then placed woman there to tend it for him. Woman left to her natural instinct, would satisfy her appetite with a few chocolate caramels and an occasional cup of tea. But when her 'lord and master' appears upon the scene, then and there is hurrying to and fro, and fires and faces blaze, and terror, and death, and destruction go forth among the feathered, and furred, and fanny tribes.

Hetty Athon Morrison died on 4 March 1885.
