= Henrietta (given name) =

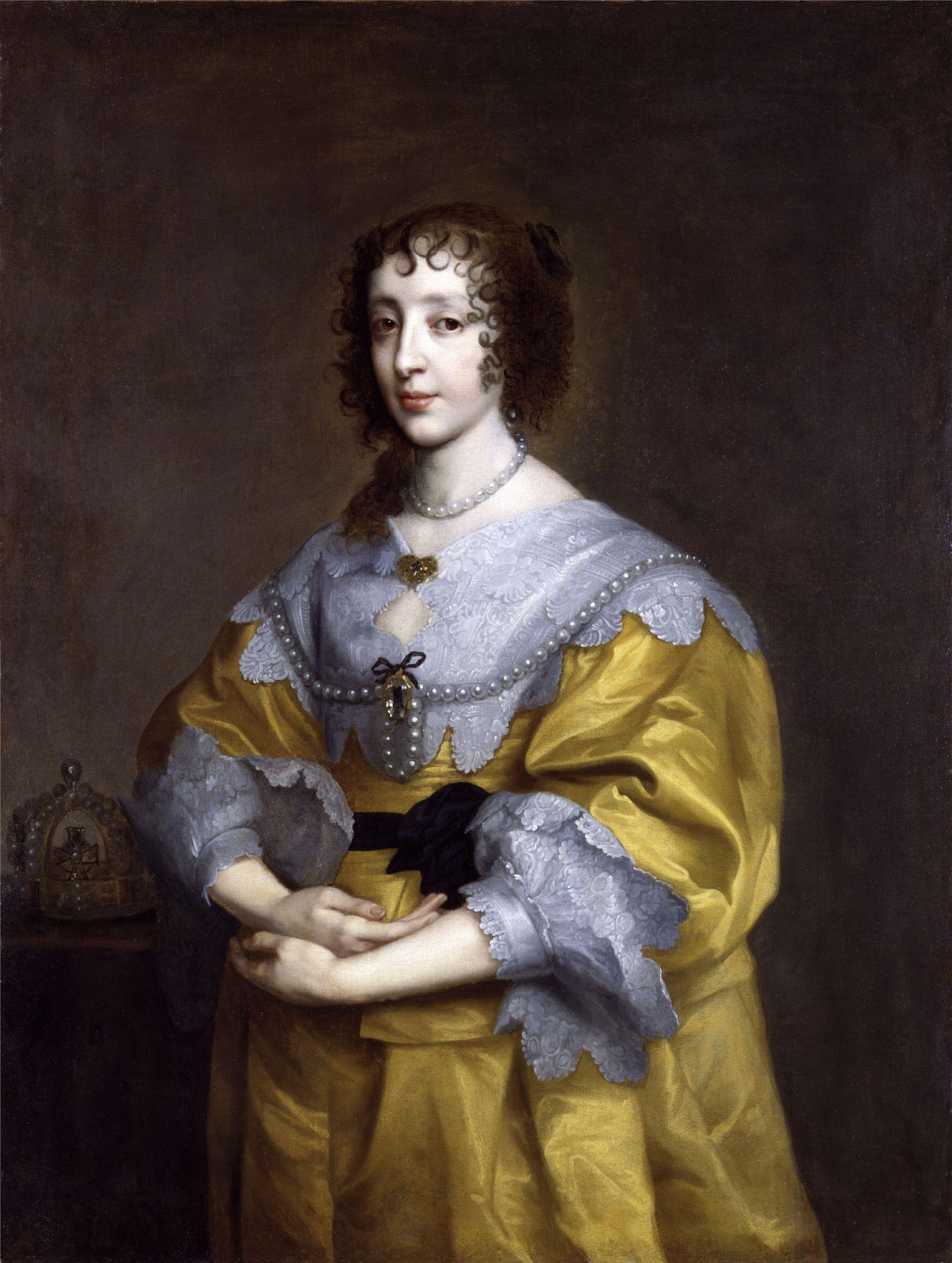
- Henrietta Maria of France was the queen consort of England, wife of Charles I of England. The name Henrietta came into wider use in England due to her.
- Gender: Female

Origin
- Origin: Germanic
- Meaning: "home ruler"

Other names
- Related names: Harriet, Heinrich, Henry, Heiko, Heike, Henrik

Henrietta is a feminine given name, derived from the male name Henry. The name is an English version of the French Henriette, a female form of Henri. A short version of the name is Harriet, which was considered the "spoken form" of Henrietta, much as Harry was considered the "spoken form" of Henry in medieval England.

All these names are derived from Henrik, which is ultimately derived from the Germanic name Heimiric, from the word elements heim, or "home" and ric, meaning "power, ruler." The male name Henry was first used in the Kingdom of England by Normans. Henrietta Maria of France, baptized as Henrietta Maria, in Latin, but called in French Henriette-Marie, the queen consort of Charles I of England, first inspired wide use of the name in England in the 17th century. In 2006, an authority on given names noted that Henrietta was one of the most "thoroughly upper-class names" in use in England.

Henrietta is no longer a widely used name in English-speaking countries, although its shorter form, Harriet, was the 73rd most popular name for baby girls born in England in 2007, and in 2005 Henrietta was the 85th most popular given name for girls born in Hungary, perhaps inspired by the fame of Henrietta Ónodi, a top-ranked Hungarian gymnast. Both Henrietta and Harriet were ranked in the top 1,000 most popular names for girls in the United States during the 1960s. Henrietta was the 446th most common name for females in the United States in the 1990 census.

== Royalty ==
Ordered chronologically

- Henrietta Maria of France (1609–1669), daughter of Henry IV of France, wife of Charles I of England
- Henrietta of England (1644–1670), daughter of Charles I of England and Henrietta Maria
- Henrietta FitzJames (1667–1730), illegitimate daughter of James II of England
- Princess Henrietta of Nassau-Weilburg (1797–1829), daughter of Frederick William, Prince of Nassau-Weilburg

== Others ==
- Henrietta Adler (1868–1950), British Liberal politician
- Henrietta Ash Bancroft (1843–1929), American professor and religious leader
- Dame Henrietta Barnett (1851–1936), English social reformer and author
- Dame Henrietta Barnett (1905–1985), British air force officer
- Henrietta Batson (1859–1943), English writer
- Henrietta Beaufort (1778–1865), Anglo-French botanist born in Ireland
- Henrietta Bentinck, Duchess of Portland (1774–1844), wife of William Bentinck, 4th Duke of Portland
- Henrietta A. Bingham (1841–1877), American writer
- Henrietta Bingham (1901–1968), American journalist, newspaper executive and horse breeder
- Henrietta Buckmaster (1909–1983), American journalist and author
- Henrietta Baker Chanfrau (1837–1909), American actress
- Henrietta Doran-York (born 1962), Minister Plenipotentiary of Sint Maarten
- Henrietta H. Fore (born 1948), UNICEF official
- Henrietta Garnett (1945–2019), English writer
- Henrietta Gayer (died 1814), Irish Methodist leader
- Henrietta Godolphin, 2nd Duchess of Marlborough (1681–1733), daughter of the 1st Duke of Marlborough
- Henrietta Caroline Henderson (1868-1959), Scottish DBE
- Henrietta Hooker (1851–1929), American botanist
- Henrietta Lacks (1920–1951), American woman who was the source of the HeLa cell line
- Henrietta Swan Leavitt (1868–1921), American astronomer
- Henrietta Amelia Leeson (1751–1826), English actress
- Henrietta Leslie (1884–1946), British suffragette, writer and pacifist
- Henrietta Stakesby Lewis (1850–1912), South African temperance leader
- Henrietta Liston (1752–1828), British botanist born in Antigua
- Henrietta G. Moore (1844–1940), Universalist minister, educator, temperance activist, suffragist
- Henrietta Moraes (1931–1999), British artists’ model and memoirist
- Henrietta "Hetty" Wilson Athon Morrison (1837–1885), American author from Indiana
- Henrietta Murray, Viscountess of Stormont (1737–1766), German-British aristocrat and salonnière
- Henrietta Barclay Paist (1870–1930), American artist and author
- Henrietta Consuelo Sansom, Countess of Quigini Puliga (1847–1938), French writer
- Henrietta Skelton (c. 1840–1900), German-born Canadian-American social reformer
- Henrietta Szold (1860–1945), American Zionist leader and founder of Hadassah
- Henrietta Tayler, known as Hetty (1869–1951), London-born Jacobite scholar and First World War nurse
- Henrietta Vansittart (1833–1883), English engineer and inventor

== Versions of the name ==
- Endika (Basque)
- Enrica (Italian)
- Enriqueta (Spanish)
- Erietta (Greek)
- Etta (English)
- Etti (English)
- Ettie (English)
- Etty (English)
- Haliaka (Hawaiian)
- Halle (English)
- Hallie (English)
- Hariala (Hawaiian)
- Hariata (Hawaiian)
- Harrieta (English)
- Harriett (English)
- Harrietta (English)
- Harriette (English)
- Harriot (English)
- Harriott (English)
- Hat (English)
- Hatt (English)
- Hatsy (English)
- Hatti (English)
- Hattie (English)
- Hatty (English)
- Heike (Dutch), (Frisian), (German)
- Heinrike (German)
- Heintje (Dutch)
- Hen ( English)
- Hendrika (Dutch)
- Hendrikje (Dutch)
- Henka (Polish)
- Henna (Finnish)
- Henni (English)
- Hennie (Dutch), (English)
- Henny (Dutch), (English)
- Henrieta (Polish)
- Henrietta (English)
- Henriette (Danish), (Dutch), (French), (German), (Norwegian)
- Henriikka (Finnish)
- Henrika (Swedish)
- Henrike (German), (Scandinavian)
- Henriqueta (Portuguese)
- Henryka (Polish)
- Hetta (English)
- Hetti (English)
- Hettie (English)
- Hetty (English)
- Jet (Dutch)
- Jett (Dutch)
- Jetje (Dutch),
- Jindřiška (Czech)
- Rika (Dutch), (Swedish)
- Rike (German)
- Riikka (Finnish)
- Yetta (English)
- Yettie (English)
- Yetty (English)
- Heni (Hungarian, Indonesian)

== See also ==
- Harriet (name)
- Henriette (disambiguation)
