= Hetty Burlingame Beatty =

American artist (1907–1971)

- Born: November 8, 1907; New Canaan, Connecticut
- Died: August 20, 1971 (aged 63)
- Known for: Illustration, Sculpture
- Movement: American modernism
- Spouse: Lewis F. Whitney (m. 1959)

Hetty Burlingame Beatty (October 8, 1907 – August 20, 1971) was an American sculptor, writer of children's literature and illustrator.

== Biography ==
Beatty was born in New Canaan, Connecticut. From 1924 until 1929 she attended the Boston Museum School. She trained as a sculptor. Frederick W. Allen was the daily instructor at that time with Charles Grafly coming up from Philadelphia twice a month to give criticisms as head of the Sculpture Department.

Her works were exhibited nationally and won a number of awards. A one-woman show of her sculpture and drawings was held at the Worcester Art Museum in 1941. She also had shows at: Art Institute of Chicago, Knoedler Gallery-New York City, MacBeth Gallery-New York, Pennsylvania Academy, and the Society of Independent Artists.

In addition to being a sculptor, Beatty also took up writing and illustrating children’s books.

On October 11, 1959, she married Lewis F. Whitney, another artist.

Beatty once commented to Contemporary Authors, "I started out as a sculptor and gradually shifted over to the field of writing, becoming so absorbed in it that I devote nearly all my time to it now, along with illustration of most of my own books for children.”

Hetty Burlingame Beatty died on August 20, 1971.

== Awards ==
- Mrs. David Hunt Scholarship in Sculpture
- Second prize at the International Exhibition of Horses in Sculpture in New York

== Authorship ==
- Topsy (1947)
- Little Wild Horse (1949)
- Little Owl Indian (1951)
- Bronto (1952)
- Saint Francis and the Wolf (1953)
- Droopy (1954)
- Thumps (1955)
- Bucking Horse (1957)
- Voyage of the Sea Wind (1959)
- Blitz (1961)
- Moorland Pony (1961)
- Trumper (1963)
- Bryn (1965)
- Rebel, the Reluctant Racehorse (1968)
