= Harriet Augusta Prunk =

American educator and school principal

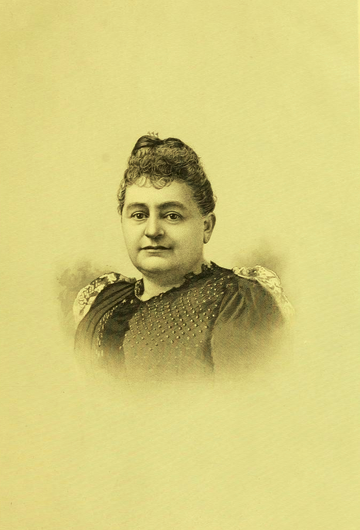
- Prunk in 1893
- Born: Harriet Augusta Smith; 1840; Cincinnati, Ohio, U.S.
- Died: October 15, 1911 (aged 70–71); Indianapolis, Indiana, U.S.
- Resting place: Crown Hill National Cemetery
- Education: Boston School of Oratory; Boston School of Expression (now Curry College)
- Occupations: reader; educator; school founder
- Employer: Indianapolis Conservatory of Music
- Known for: founder, Indiana Boston School of Elocution and Expression
- Spouse: Daniel Hammond Prunk (m. 1858)
- Children: 3

Signature
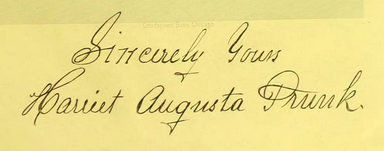

Harriet Augusta Prunk (née Smith; 1840–1911) was an American reader, educator, and school principal who founded the Indiana Boston School of Elocution and Expression. For many years, Prunk was prominent in Indianapolis, Indiana as a reader and instructor; hundreds of people on the professional stage and in other lines where speaking is employed were her pupils. During her long association with educational movements, she was well known throughout the U.S.

== Early life and education ==
Harriet Augusta Smith was a native of Cincinnati, Ohio. Her parents were William J. and Lavinia (Lennox) Smith. Her parents were natives of Virginia, where the maternal name of Lennox figured prominently for many generations, her grandfather Lennox having been a lieutenant in the American Revolutionary War.

Soon after her birth, Prunk's family moved to Covington, Kentucky, where she was reared and resided until her marriage.

In 1859, Prunk graduated from the Wesleyan Female College. Very early in life she evidenced talent in declamation and elocution, which gave her some prominence during her college years, so that she was assigned duties of this sort at entertainments, as well as at social gatherings, and amateur entertainments.

Her marriage did not end her studies, for she devoted another ten years studying in the field of elocution. In October 1877, she entered the Boston School of Oratory, graduating in May 1879, which was one year less than the regular course. She received special instruction from Profs. Steele MacKaye and R. R. Raymond, of Boston and New York. From time to time, she was a student at the Boston School of Expression (now Curry College).

== Career ==
The public first appearance of Prunk in a professional capacity was in the Grand Opera House, Indianapolis, in October 1878. Her second appearance was in Tremont Temple, Boston, May 19, 1879, before a large assembly. Her reception was an ovation, and the press of Boston praised her performance. Thereafter, she appeared in public on many occasions, but principally in Indianapolis.

Prunk established the Indiana Boston School of Elocution and Expression, of Indianapolis, in the fall of 1879, serving as principal. Her students included ministers, professors, teachers, elocutionists, readers, and actors.

In 1902, Prunk became principal of the Indianapolis Conservatory of Music's Department of Elocution, Oratory and Dramatic Art, including training in Delsarte and physical culture. Her work was endorsed by William E. Sheldon, editor of New England Journal of Education; Right Rev. David Buel Knickerbacker, Bishop of Indiana; Rev. Edward Bradley, of New York City; Rev. Dr. Cleveland, of Indianapolis; Rev. Dr. Haines of Indianapolis, and others.

In addition, she had charge of the dramatic art departments of the J. H. Kappes school, the Girls' Classical school, and the Knickerbacker Hall school.

She was a member of the Daughters of the American Revolution.

== Personal life ==
On March 30, 1858, she married Daniel Hammond Prunk. Their children were: Frank Howard, born at Princeton, Illinois, March 14, 1860; Harry Clayton, born at Indianapolis, August 17, 1861, and Byron Fletcher, born at Indianapolis, December 20, 1866.

In April 1861, she moved to Indianapolis.

Harriet Augusta Prunk died in Indianapolis, on October 15, 1911. Burial was at Crown Hill National Cemetery.
