= Harriet Redfield Cobb =

American mathematics professor

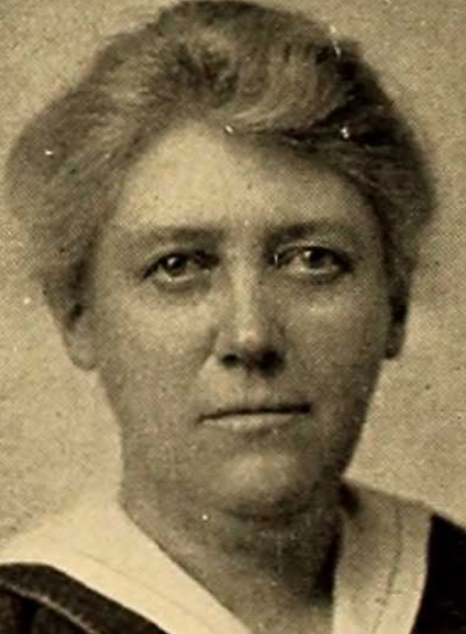
- Harriet Redfield Cobb, from the 1925 yearbook of Smith College
- Born: September 10, 1866; Peekskill, New York
- Died: February 13, 1958; Northampton, Massachusetts
- Occupation: Mathematics professor

Harriet Redfield Cobb (September 10, 1866 – February 13, 1958) was an American mathematics educator, a professor at Smith College from 1895 to 1931.

== Early life and education ==
Cobb was born in Peekskill, New York, the daughter of Elisha G. Cobb and Esther Meroa Redfield Cobb. Her father was a Congregational clergyman. She attended Northampton High School and earned a bachelor's degree in mathematics at Smith College in 1889, and an honorary master's degree, also from Smith College, in 1891. She pursued further studies at Columbia University.

== Career ==
Cobb taught mathematics at schools in Louisiana and Ohio before returning to Smith as a mathematics instructor in 1895. She taught geometry at Smith College until she retired as professor emerita in 1931. Her colleagues at Smith included fellow mathematics professors Eleanor P. Cushing. Ruth Goulding Wood, and Suzan Rose Benedict. She was a member of Phi Beta Kappa and a president of the Western Massachusetts Mathematics Association. She also taught Bible study classes at a Congregational church.

Cobb was a busy traveler. She made an eight-month trip around the world with her friend, Pennsylvania math educator Sarah Gilbert, in 1907 and 1908. She traveled to China several times in the 1920s, and consulted there on math education for Chinese women.

Cobb spent much of her retirement in Florida. She was active in Smith alumnae activities there. In 1936 she spoke to an audience of retired teachers in Florida about "The Pioneer Spirit of Smith College".

== Personal life ==
Cobb died in 1958, aged 91 years, in Northampton, Massachusetts.
