= Harriet Almaria Baker Suddoth =

American writer

Harriet Almaria Baker Suddoth (pseudonym, Lumina Silvervaleb; - d.1889) was a nineteenth-century American domestic science writer who published a cookbook and house-keeping guide in 1883 called The American Pictorial Home Book. This book was one of the earliest such guides published in California, and catered to a Western audience. The introductory chapter to The American Pictorial Home Book notes that Suddoth was Christian and had engaged in missions before finding her calling as a writer. This Christian influence is communicated through the social guidance the book offers.

The introduction to The American Pictorial Home Book, written by W.A. Scott founder and president of San Francisco College at the time, lauds Suddoth's Christian virtue and respectability and underscores the western audience of the book. He states that he hopes that "it will find a place in thousands of families, especially on this side of our continent, in the homes of our mountains and valleys, where everything is yet in a forming state, and where the foundations of future greatness shall be wisely laid and firmly established on a good family government, and on sound principles so that we may hope for the virtue and high culture of generations to come."

Suddoth also wrote under the pseudonym "Lumina Silvervale." Her book under this name was entitled An Orphan of the Old Dominion: Her Trials and Travels, Embracing a History of Her Life Taken Primarily from her Journals and Letters. In that book, she chronicles her life in the South, details injustices toward women (especially in the realm of inheritance), and writes about the pioneer experience. Davis (1993:19) writes that “The major portion of the book treats Almaria’s efforts to overcome the sexism in her society, to receive and education, and to achieve her ambition of becoming a teacher-missionary”.

Suddoth had previously published The Housekeeper's Encyclopedia. (Note: Her Pictorial Home Book and An Orphan of the OLd Dominion are available online.)

Her obituary notes that she died in St. Louis, Missouri.

== Works ==
- The American Pictorial Home Book
- The Housekeeper's Encyclopedia
- An Orphan of the Old Dominion: Her Trials and Travels, Embracing a History of Her Life Taken Primarily from her Journals and Letters
