= Harriet Anderson Stubbs Murphy =

British-American portrait artist

Harriet Anderson Stubbs Murphy (1853 – September 23, 1935) was a British-American portrait artist.

== Early life ==
Harriet Anderson Stubbs was born in Liverpool, England, in 1853. After leaving England, she spent some time in Montreal, Canada, before coming to New York City.

== Career ==
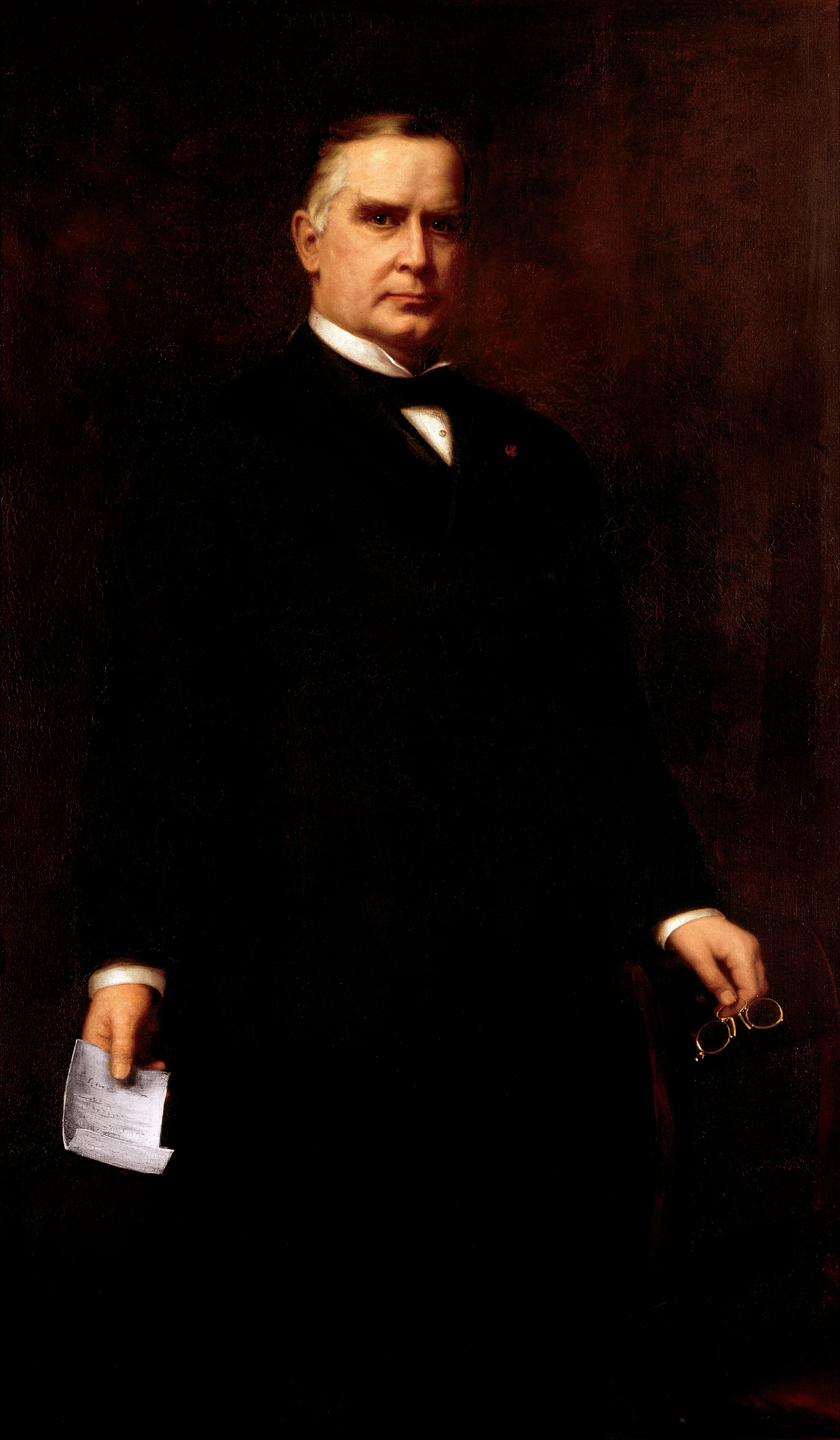
President William McKinley's official White House portrait, by Murphy, 1902

Harriet, a self-taught painter who began when she was only twelve years old, painted more than 1,000 portraits, including many prominent figures of the day, including Presidents Ulysses S. Grant, Theodore Roosevelt, William McKinley, and Woodrow Wilson. One of her portraits of McKinley hung in The Union League Club, and the other in the White House.

She also painted portraits of Margaret Olivia Slocum Sage, Admiral George Dewey and Governor William Dillingham (part of the Vermont State Archives), Senator Mark Hanna, Joseph H. Choate, John Hay, John Stewart Kennedy, J. Pierpont Morgan, John D. Rockefeller, Laura Spelman Rockefeller, Bessie Rockefeller, E. H. Harriman, Cornelius N. Bliss, General Daniel Butterfield, Adrian Georg Iselin, Thomas Edison, Chauncey Depew, and New York mayors Abram Hewitt, Seth Low, and William Lafayette Strong. She also painted Chief Justice of the United States Supreme Court, Melville Fuller.

One of the few woman working in portraiture at the time, Harriet could command better rates through her husband's name (up to $4,000 for a commission), therefore, "her portraits were signed W.D. Murphy". Reportedly, after discovering that his wife was a better artist than him, William abandoned his own work and became her business agent.

== Personal life ==
In 1886, she married fellow artist William Daniel Murphy. Together, they were the parents of:

- Jean Una Murphy, who became a commercial artist
- Albert J. Murphy, who was an educator and author.

After the death of her husband in 1928, she moved to the Hotel Irvin for Women at 308 West 30th Street in New York City. After a two month illness, Harried died on September 23, 1935, at the Home for Incurables in the Bronx. After a service at the Chapel of the Home for Incurables, she was buried in St. Michael's Cemetery on Astoria Boulevard in Queens.
