= Harriet Sophia Cobb =

New Zealand photographer (1855–1929)

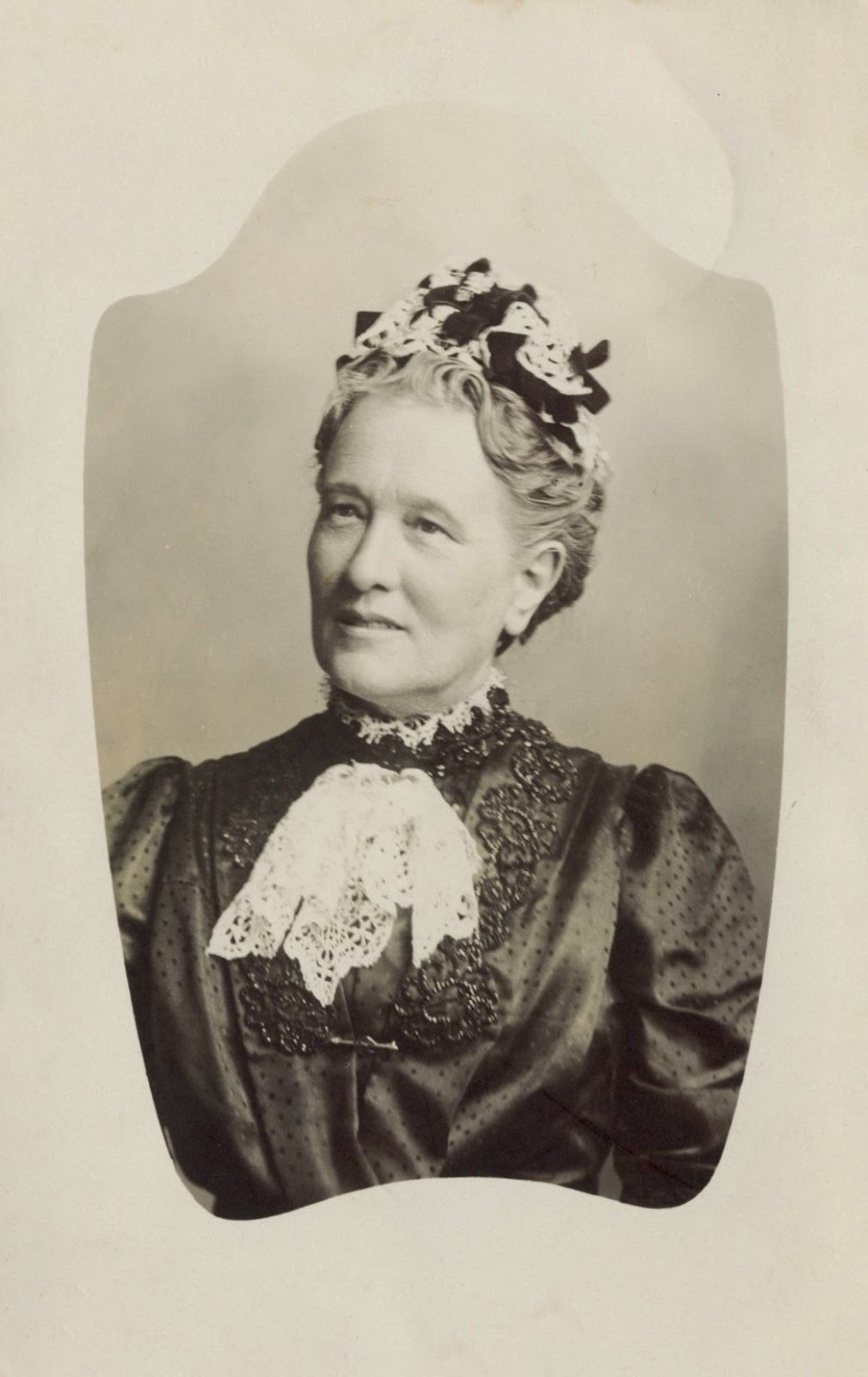
- Born: Harriet Sophia Day; 10 February 1846; Winfarthing, England
- Died: 18 December 1929 (aged 83); Otahuhu, New Zealand
- Known for: Photography
- Spouse: Joseph Edward Cobb (m. 1866)

Harriet Sophia Cobb (née Day, 10 February 1846 – 18 December 1929) was a New Zealand photographer. Her works are held in the collection of the Museum of New Zealand Te Papa Tongarewa. Cobb operated two successful photography studios in the late 1800s and into the 20th century.

== Early life ==
Cobb was the eldest of nine children, and was born in Winfarthing, Norfolk, United Kingdom, in 1846, to Robert Day and Emily Page. Her father was an early photographer in Bournemouth who taught her the trade of photography. In 1866 she married Joseph Edward Cobb, and they went on to have 15 children.

== Photography career ==
In 1867 Cobb and her husband set up a photographic studio near Bournemouth.

In 1884 Cobb and her husband emigrated from the United Kingdom to New Zealand with their nine children and set up a photographic studio in the Hawke's Bay. They arrived in Wellington on the Lady Jocelyn.

The couple operated two studios known as JE & H Cobb in Napier (from 1884) and Hastings (from 1885), but in 1887 after Joseph's bankruptcy, Cobb won a plea to operate the businesses in her name until she retired in 1911.

A series of photographs which Cobb titled 'Vignette Studies from Life' were exhibited at New Zealand's first Industrial Exhibition in Wellington in 1885, and her work caught the attention of Julius von Haast who selected it for inclusion in the New Zealand contingent at the 1886 Colonial and Indian Exhibition in London.

In 1889 Cobb submitted photographs to the New Zealand and South Seas Exhibition held in Dunedin, and won a special first class award for her life studies.

Cobb signed the Women's suffrage petition in 1892 at 46 years of age, and at the time had a new baby John Wesley, the youngest of her 15 children.

Cobb died on 18 December 1929 in Ōtāhuhu, Auckland.

== See also ==
- List of suffragists and suffragettes
