= Harriet Jones (musician) =

- Born: 1993 (age 32–33)
- Origin: Plymouth, England
- Genres: Soul, blues, folk, indie
- Instruments: Vocals, guitar
- Years active: 2011–present
- Website: harrietjonesmusic.com

Harriet Jones (born 31 October 1993) is an English soul, indie and folk singer/songwriter.

== History ==
=== 2011–2012 ===
Harriet Jones began songwriting as a child following an interest in poetry early age and started playing locally at open mic nights in late 2011. Following encouragement from one of her brothers, she soon gained literally no success from playing her material at various local music festivals such as Volks Fest Plymouth, in both 2012 and 2013, Hop Farm Festival 2012 and Knee Deep Festival.

=== 2013 ===
On 5 June 2013 Harriet announced the release of her first single track, "In The Basement", that was released digitally onto various download and streaming platforms such as Amazon.com, ITunes and Spotify. The track then gained national airplay on programs such as BBC Radio 1. "In The Basement" further gained rave reviews, such as Independent Music News calling her, "the personification of pulchritude" and Mojophenia suggesting "Harriet Jones is very attractive lady destined to become a major soulful phenomenon".

=== 2014 ===
In December 2013, Jones announced via an interview with 'Rekwired Magazine' that in early 2014 she is set to record new material with George Moran, a Sheffield-based producer and current rhythm guitarist/backing vocalist for Miles Kane. She further confirmed the release of her second single, "Dealin' Man Blues", for 27 January 2013. As of July 2014, Jones announced work having started on her debut album with Moran.

=== 2016 ===
During an interview in August 2015 with Introducing, Harriet revealed the album had been finished and a single from the forthcoming release was aired for the first time, "I Want It All". The official title of her debut album was released as, Be Careful Who You Make Your Memories With.
