= Harriet B. Jones =

American politician

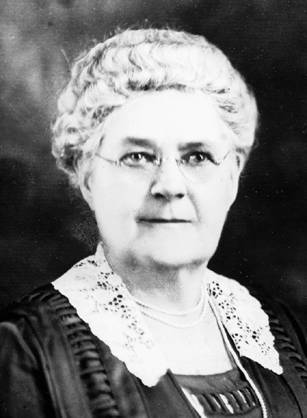
- Born: June 3, 1856; Ebensburg, Pennsylvania, US
- Died: June 28, 1943 (aged 87)
- Education: Woman's Medical College of Baltimore

Harriet B. Jones (3 June 1856 – 28 June 1943) was the first woman to be licensed as a physician in West Virginia. She was also one of the first women to be elected to the West Virginia House of Delegates.

== Life ==
In 1856, Harriet B. Jones was born in Ebensburg, Pennsylvania to John P. Jones and Hanna Rodgers Jones. When she was 6 years old, her family moved to Terra Alta, West Virginia in Preston County, which was at the time called Cranberry Summit. Her father John was born in 1832 in Cardiganshire, Wales and immigrated to the United States in 1838. Her mother, Hanna, was born in 1832 and was also from Wales. Her father was an active politician, and was also involved in the local Presbyterian church. He also served in the state legislature for three terms. She was one of five children in her family. In her private life, Jones enjoyed playing music. She played the piano since childhood, and received instruction for piano at Wheeling Female Seminary. While alive, her flower garden was well known in Marshall County, West Virginia. She died in 1943.

== Career ==
=== Education ===
Jones attended Wheeling Female College, located in West Virginia, and went on to graduate from Woman's Medical College of Baltimore with honors in 1884. She pursued training after graduation in Chicago, New York, and Philadelphia. She specialized in gynecology and abdominal surgery. Upon completing her training, she returned to West Virginia, settling in Wheeling.

=== Medical career ===
In 1886, Jones became the first female doctor to ever be licensed in the state of West Virginia. In 1888, she was named assistant superintendent by the board of the West Virginia Hospital for the Insane located in Weston, West Virginia. She served as assistant superintendent until 1892. This hospital would later be renamed Weston State Hospital. In 1892, she returned to Wheeling and established a women's hospital. The hospital would go on to operate for 20 years. Over the course of her career, she founded four state institutions: The West Virginia Industrial Home for Girls, located in Salem, West Virginia; The State Tuberculosis Sanitarium, located in Terra Alta, West Virginia; the West Virginia Children's Home in Elkins, West Virginia; and the State Tuberculosis Sanitarium for the Colored. Additionally, Jones served on the state board of nurses.

=== Activism & Politics ===
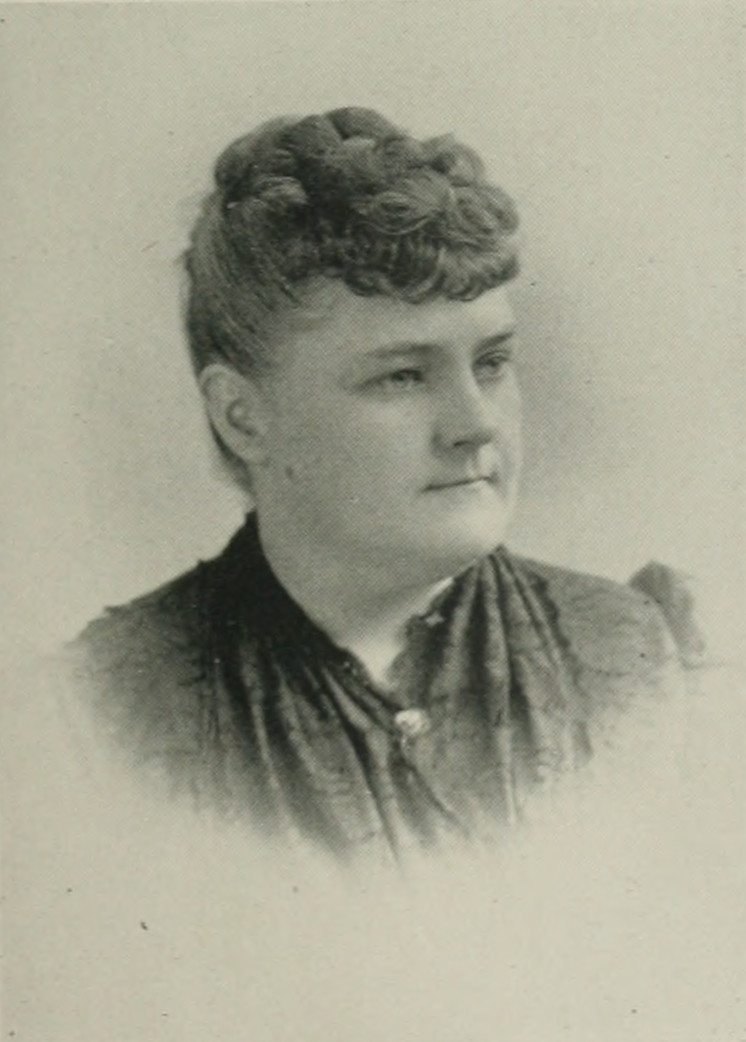
Harriet B. Jones ca. 1897

Jones held a great interest in the rights of women in the United States. In 1889, she won the right for women to attend West Virginia's state colleges and universities. She was active in many organizations, including the West Virginia Equal Suffrage Association, the State Medical Association, the Ohio County Medical Society, The American Medical Association, the League of Women Voters, and the West Virginia chapter of the Woman's Christian Temperance Union,. Women's suffrage was very important to Jones, and she was very involved in encouraging women to vote. She was heavily involved in the League of Women Voters. She was the only woman from West Virginia to be honored on a commemorative tablet by the League of Women Voters. The tablet was meant to honor the leaders of the movement, and was established in 1930 in Washington, D.C.

Jones was also a successful lobbyist. She also held an interest in improving the lives of delinquent girls, and lobbied to establish state legislature that would establish a school for them. This lobbying process took six years. In 1897, she finally won this battle, and The West Virginia Industrial Home for Girls was established in Salem, West Virginia 1899. She remained on the board of this institution for 12 years. As secretary of the West Virginia Anti-Tuberculosis League, Jones also gave lectures on tuberculosis to thousands throughout West Virginia, advocated for better knowledge of the disease.

Jones also entered the field of politics, once the right to vote was established in 1920. She became the first woman to serve in the West Virginia House of Delegates. (Incorrect, check source, Anna Johnson Gates was the first woman in the state government.) She was elected as a Republican, representing Marshall County. She went on to be re-elected, and served a second term.

== Works ==
- Registration, Primary, and General Election Law.
- Facts that Every Intelligent Voter Should Know About the Government of West Virginia
- The Health Laws of West Virginia
- The Prevalence of Tuberculosis and the Danger of Infection
- Introductory Parliamentary Law
