= Harriet Louise Hardy =

American physician and professor

- Born: September 23, 1906; Arlington, Massachusetts, U.S.
- Died: October 13, 1993 (aged 87)
- Education: Wellesley College; Cornell University
- Medical career
- Field: Occupational medicine
- Institutions: Harvard University; Massachusetts General Hospital; Radcliffe College; Northfield School
- Sub-specialties: Toxicology; Environment-related illness
- Research: Toxicology
- Awards: Medical Woman of the Year of the American Medical Women's Association; Award of Merit of the American Academy of Occupational Medicine; Alice Hamilton Award of the New York Academy of Sciences.

Harriet Louise Hardy (September 23, 1906 - October 13, 1993) was an American pioneer in occupational medicine and the first woman professor at Harvard Medical School. Her main points of study were toxicology and environmental related illness. She died on October 13, 1993, of cancer of the immune system at Massachusetts General Hospital.

== Career ==
Hardy completed her residency at Philadelphia General Hospital—one of the few hospitals to accept women students at the time. She then went to work for Northfield School educating the female students on how to cope with such traumatic issues as rape, drownings, and student accidents. She also taught the girls anatomy and the effects of venereal disease. After five years at Northfield Academy, she began working in a field that would become a significant area of study for her throughout her career.

Her studies on beryllium began in 1945 when she started working for the Massachusetts Division of Occupational Medicine. She studied factories that produced fluorescent bulbs in Lynn, Salem, and Ipswich, Massachusetts. She discovered that many of the workers contracted berylliosis. Berylliosis is caused by the inhalation of dust or fumes containing beryllium. The disease presents itself with coughing, weight loss, shortness of breath, and scarring of the lungs. While beryllium was a main area of study for Dr. Hardy, throughout her career, she also studied anthrax, mercury poisoning, women's growth, and physical fitness.

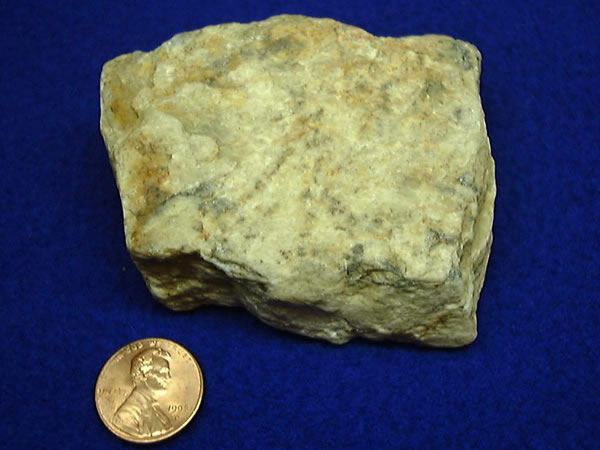
Beryllium ore

== Leadership ==
Throughout her career, Dr. Hardy worked on a variety of studies and projects around the world. Below are just a few of her more notable contributions to science and medicine:

- At Massachusetts Institute of Technology: led the occupational medicine service.
- At Dartmouth College: coordinated the study of industrial diseases
- At the Atomic Energy Commission in Los Alamos, New Mexico: studied the hazards of nuclear energy.
- At Massachusetts General Hospital: created the U.S. Beryllium Case Registry in 1952.
- Served on numerous committees including the United Mine Workers, the Coal Workers' Safety Board, National Institute for Occupational Safety and Health, and the International Labour Organization.

== Works ==
- Hardy, Harriet L.; Irving R. Tabershaw. "Delayed Chemical Pneumonitis Occurring in Workers Exposed to Beryllium Compounds." The Journal of Industrial Hygiene and Toxicology 28 (1946): 197–211.
- Hardy, Harriet L. "Challenging Man-made Disease.", Praeger Publishers Inc; 1ST edition (November 1983), 200 p.

== External links and further reading ==
- Papers of Harriet Louise Hardy, 1910-1984. Schlesinger Library, Radcliffe Institute, Harvard University.
- Harriet Hardy Interview, 1988 on YouTube
- Salerno, D. F., and I. L. Feitshans. "Harriet L Hardy, MD: Fighting Man-made Disease." Journal of Epidemiol Community Health. 57.12 (2003): 924.
