= Hettie Inniss =

British Caribbean Artist

Hettie Inniss (born in 1999 in London) is a British Caribbean artist known for her abstract works that explore personal and collective memory.

Based in London, she investigates sensory triggers—particularly smell—to reconstruct memories. Inniss says smell is "one of her most predominant senses" and she spends significant time reflecting on a memory behind a certain smell before creating art from memory. She often uses vivid colors, layered abstraction and symbolic imagery. She is recognized as one of the "Five Painters of Tomorrow" by Ocula 2023 and 2025 Artsy Vanguard's honoree.

== Early life and education ==
Inniss completed her BA in Art and Design at the University of Leeds in 2022. She earned an MA in Painting from the Royal College of Art (RCA) in London, graduating in 2023. While studying she received the Sir Frank Bowling Scholarship in 2022. The scholarship picks two home students on MA (Master of Arts) Fine Art course at Chelsea College of Arts. Inniss is also one of the six participants to receive a Colart Winsor & Newton Bursary (2023). ColArt Winsor & Newton International Art offers a $1,000 bursary of Winsor and Newton art materials and are also given exhibition opportunities.

== Artistic practice ==
Inniss is focused on creating works from inspired by her memories and sensory triggers such as sound, visuals, taste, touch and smell. She was inspired by Marcel Proust's concept of involuntary memory which explores how senses like smell can trigger recollections. She explained these moment of sensory triggers as "emotional and visual whiplash", it occurs when she tries to deliberately remember things but another memory suddenly interrupts her causing involuntary recollections. Her paintings feature abstract architectural spaces rendered in vivid amber, red, and orange hues, which she associates with the 'fleshiness' of light seen through closed eyelids.

Inniss' art challenges fixed notions of that memory and identity. By avoiding literal human figures and using light/shadow to imply presence, she rejects stereotypes about Blackness, advocating instead for Black Fluidity —a concept embracing identity as layered and unbounded.

She practices meditation to reach momentary memories, when a memory appears she sketches them before expanding them onto a canvas. The process of transferring sketch onto canvas includes using layered oil, oil sticks, sand and pigments for creating textures for the multidimensional surfaces. Inniss described her method of process as a "performance of memory," where there are empty spaces in her memory and she fills them intuitively through mark-making. Her work often takes weeks to months to finish depending on what feelings or mood she wants her art to evoke.

== Works and exhibitions ==
=== Solo exhibition ===
- Rememories from the Floating World (2024, GRIMM, London): Inniss' debut solo exhibition featuring paintings inspired by scent-triggered memories, such as London Feels Sad In The Rain, "stems from the smell of rain on tarmac, which unlocked memories of me running track when I was at school"

==== Group exhibition ====
- Somewhere In Between (2023, Hew Hood Gallery, London): a group show highlighting her exploration of memory and identity along with peers.

===== Commission =====
- Tate Collective Commission (2023): Inniss created an untitled work responding to Paul Maheke's Mutual Survival, Lorde's Manifesto (2015).

====== Notable works ======
- Bleached (2024) oil, oil stick and sand on canvas, 1.3 × 1 m.
- The Gap Between Us (2024) Oil, oil stick and sand on canvas. 44 x 30 cm.
- Clawing At the Truth (2024) oil on canvas - 160 x 170 cm.

== Awards ==
- Sir Frank Bowling Scholarship (2022)
- ColArt Winsor & Newton Bursary (2023)
