= Ruth Goulding Wood =

American mathematician

- Born: January 29, 1875; Pawtucket, Rhode Island, US
- Died: May 5, 1939 (aged 64)
- Education: Smith College, Yale University and University of Göttingen
- Occupation: Professor of Mathematics

Ruth Goulding Wood (January 29, 1875 – May 5, 1939) was a professor of mathematics who researched non-Euclidean geometry at Smith College. Wood was also a member of the American Mathematical Society.

== Life and career ==
Wood was born on January 29, 1875, in the city of Pawtucket, Rhode Island. After attending primary and secondary school in Pawtucket, Wood pursued and graduated with a bachelor's degree from Smith College in 1898. Wood then decided to further her education by attending Yale University, graduating with a Ph.D. in mathematics in 1901. Her thesis, Non-Euclidean displacements and symmetry transformations, concerned the symmetries of a quadric surface and was published in the Annals of Mathematics.

After receiving her Ph.D. from Yale, Wood shortly worked as an instructor at Mount Holyoke College. Starting in 1902, Wood worked as an instructor for seven years at the same college where she received her bachelor's degree, Smith College. Before moving up to be an associate professor, Wood spent a year of postgraduate study at the University of Göttingen in Göttingen, Germany. In 1914, she was promoted to a professor. She also served as department head from 1922 to 1928.

After working as a professor for twenty-one years at Smith College, Wood retired in 1935. She then traveled the world to places such as California, Italy, South America, Greece, Egypt, and Turkey. Four years following her retirement, Ruth Goulding Wood died May 5, 1939, leaving behind her will. In her will, she directed that her funds be passed down to her inheritors and once her inheritors died, the remainder of her estate would go to Smith College. It would then be used to help increase the pay of women mathematics professors, allowing their salary to be equal to the highest-paid salary there.
