= List of New York State Historic Markers in Columbia County, New York =

This is a complete list of New York State Historic Markers in Columbia County, New York.

== Listings county-wide ==
	Marker name	Image	Date designated	Location	City or Town	Marker text
1	Ancram Copake Line			County Rd., W. Copake to Ancram.	Ancram, New York	Ancram Formed as Gallatin 1803. Name Changed 1814 Divided 1830. Copake Formed from Taghkanic 1824
2	Site of Iron Works			NYS 82 in Ancram	Ancram, New York	First in Colony of New York, Had 4 Forges. Founded by Robert Livingston 1748. Demolished 1854.
3	Site of Lead Mines			NYS 82 in Ancramdale	Ancram, New York	Ore Discovered by Mr. Keefer. Livingston Bought Lease 1827 Operated to 1837. Others Operated to 1866.
4	Town And County Line			NYS 82 At Co. Line Between Ancramdale & Pulvers Corners	Ancram, New York	Pine Plains, Dutches County, Org'D 1823; Part of Northeast 1788, Part Little Nine Partners 1706. Ancram, Columbia County Formed 1814.
5	Town of Ancram			NYS 82 in Ancram.	Ancram, New York	Named in Honor of The Ancestral Home of The Livingstons At Teviotdale Roxburghshire, Scotland.
6	Famous Prize Fight			Under Mountain Rd in Boston Corners.	Ancram, New York	Won by John Morrissey over 'Yankee' Sullivan in this area on Oct. 5, 1883, lasted 37 rounds and was witnessed by more than 3000 persons.
7	Spencertown Academy			NYS 203 in Spencertown.	Austerlitz, New York	1847 Timothy Woodbridge D.D., First President Used Continuously as School House Since Erection.
8	Douglas House			Co. Rd., N. of Canaan Corners.	Canaan, New York	Home of Asa Douglas. Noted Resort of Whigs During The Revolution. Garret Used to Confine Tory Neighbors.
9	Jason Warner House			On Paper Mill Hill Rd., S. of Queechy.	Canaan, New York	Many of Scenes in "Wide Wide World" And "Queechy" Were Laid in And Around This House Where Susan And Anna Warner, Noted American Authors, Spent Several Summers.
10	Red Rock			Co. Rd. At Red Rock.	Red Rock, New York	Settled in 1750 Formerly Known as Pilfershire.
11	Site of Grist Mill			NYS 295 Near Queechy Lake.	Canaan, New York	Built by Col. William B. Whiting. Burned During The Revolution by Tories, When Filled With Government Grain. Rebuilt Later.
12	Friends Meeting House			Co. Rd. At Rayville.	Chatham, New York	Built in 1777 At Rayville First in Columbia County.
13	Groat's Tavern			NYS 66 in Chatham.	Chatham, New York	First Building Erected in Chatham - Built by William Thomas in 1811 - Chatham Was First Called Groat's Corners.
14	Abraham Van Ness			NYS 66 S. of Malden Bridge.	Chatham, New York	Home of Abraham Van Ness Officer in Revolution Who Was Shot On Bridge by Tories in August, 1777
15	Van Alstyne House			Co. Rd. E. of Chatham Ctr.	Chatham, New York	Reputed to Have Been Used as A Fort During Revolution.
16	Brick House			US 9, North of Clermont.	Claverack, New York	Built 1804 by Dr. Thomas Brodhead The Bricks Were Made Here by Clay Kneaded by Cattle Being Driven Over It.
17	Claverack-Ghent Line			NYS 66, West of NYS 9H.	Claverack, New York	Claverack A District 1772, Town 1788. Hillsdale Taken Off 1782, Hudson 1785. Ghent Formed from Parts of Chatham, Claverack, Kinderhook 1818.
18	Clermont			US 9, in Clermont.	Claverack, New York	Post-Office Established in 1791. One of The First Hundred Post Offices in The U.S.
19	New York's First Public School			US 9, in Clermont.	Claverack, New York	New York's First Public School Was Established At Clermont in 1791.
20	Post Road			NYS 9H N.E. of Junct. With NYS 66	Claverack, New York	Post Road - 1772 Albany to New York. Weekly Mail Service Established On Horseback. Passenger Service by Covered Wagons And Four Horses in 1786.
21	Site of Tollgate			US 9, South of Clermont.	Claverack, New York	Site of Tollgate of The Highland Turnpike Company .
22	The Academy			US 9, in Clermont.	Claverack, New York	Built in 1834 as A Seminary of Learning The Land Was Given by Edward P. Livingston.
23	Clermont			West of Co. Rd., N. of Tivoli .	Clermont, New York	Built 1730, On Livingston Manor. Home of Chancellor Livingston, One of The Five Drafters of The Declaration of Independence.
24	Clermont			Co. Rd., West of NYS 9G.	Clermont, New York	Built 1730, On Livingston Manor. Home of Chancellor Livingston, One of The Five Drafters of The Declaration of Independence.
25	Clermont			NYS 9G, North of Tivoli.	Clermont, New York	Built 1730, On Livingston Manor. Home of Chancellor Livingston, One of The Five Drafters of The Declaration of Independence.
26	Copake-Hillsdale Line			NYS 22, S. of Hillsdale.	Copake, New York	Copake Part of Granger 1803, Formed from Taghkanic 1824. Hillsdale Formed from Claverack as District 1782, Town 1786.
27	Farm of Hans Chrysler			Co. Rd., N. of Chrysler Pond.	Copake, New York	Farm of Hans Chrysler For Whom Chrysler Pond Was Named. Home of Amy Mariah Chrysler, Born 1770.
28	Church Cemetery			Co. Rd., S. of Spaulding Furnace.	Gallatin, New York	Church Cemetery Connected With Reformed Protestant Dutch Church Known as Stissick, Gallatin, Ancram, Greenbush And Vedder.
29	Dings Cemetery			At Silvernails.	Gallatin, New York	Oldest Cemetery in Gallatin Private For Dings Family Before 1748.
30	Gallatin-Ancram Town Line			NYS 82 West of Ancram.	Gallatin, New York	Gallatin And Ancram Organized as Gallatin 1803; Name Changed to Ancram 1814 Separated 1830.
31	Gallatin-Livingston Town Line			Co. Rd., N. of Elizaville.	Gallatin, New York	Gallatin Organized from Livingston 1803. Livingston A Manor 1686; A District 1772; A Town 1788, Including Gallatin, Ancram, Taghkanic And Copake.
32	Gallatin-Milan Town Line			Co. Rd., E. of Elizaville.	Gallatin, New York	Dividing Gallatin, Columbia County, Organized 1803, from Milan, Dutchess County Organized 1818 .
33	Gallatin-Taghkanic Town Line			NYS 82 At Entrance to Lake Taghkanic State Park.	Gallatin, New York	Gallatin Organized 1803 And Included Ancram. Taghkanic Organized 1803 as Granger And Included Copake. Both Taken from Livingston.
34	Gallatinville			At Gallatinville.	Gallatin, New York	Named For Honorable Abraham A. A. Gallatin. B. Geneva, Switzerland, 1761 D. New York City, N.Y., 1849 Secretary of Treasury 1801–1813 .
35	Historic Farm			Co. Rd., N. of Mt. Rose.	Gallatin, New York	Rev. Herman Vedder in Family Since May 1, 1804, Life Lease from John Livingston. Shall Minister & PreachGospel in Greenbush Church.
36	Lasher House			Co. Rd., About 2½ Mis. S. of Suydam.	Gallatin, New York	Oldest Part Built About 1770 in Possession of Lasher Family Until 1910.
37	Old Turnpike Road			Co. Rd. At Spaulding Furnace.	Gallatin, New York	Old Turnpike Road to Nobletown, Ancram And Barrington.
38	Old Turnpike			NYS 82 At Suydam.	Gallatin, New York	The Old Road from The Hudson River Through Ancaram to Salisbury Connecticut.
39	Signal Rock			2½ Mis. W. of Co. Rd., Suydam to Spaulding Furnace.	Gallatin, New York	Used by Indians For Fires. Fires Built On This Rock Could Be Seen For Many Miles. Called Green Hill Indian Signal Rock.
40	Site of Plow Furnace			Co. Rd. At Spaulding Furance.	Gallatin, New York	Established 1840 by Moses Spaulding On Spaulding Creek. Abandoned 1910.
41	Site of First Suydam School House			NYS 82 At Suydam.	Gallatin, New York	Burned Oct. 1918. Land Donated by Jacob Suydam About 1800.
42	Site of Mannessah Home			Silvernails-Pine Plains Rd.	Gallatin, New York	Home Prince Quack Mannessah of The Mohican Shacomeco Clan Was The Last Known Indian Resident of Gallatin.
43	Site of Dings House			At Silvernails.	Gallatin, New York	Home of Hans Dings, One of First Settlers of Gallatin, N.Y. Before 1748. Leased from Livingston.
44	Stage Inn			NYS 82, West of Suydam.	Gallatin, New York	Suydam's Hotel, 1798–1822; Dr. C. Duydam's Office 1798–1822; J. Suydam Jr's Hotel, 1822–49; Suydam Post Office Until 1906.
45	Town And County Line			Co. Rd., W. of Jackson's Crnrs.	Gallatin, New York	Gallatin, Columbia County Pine Plains, Dutchess County Gallatin Organized 1803 Pine Plains Organized 1823.
46	Town And County Line			Silvernails-Pine Plains Rd.	Gallatin, New York	Gallatin, Columbia County Pine Plains, Dutchess County Gallatin Organized 1803 Pine Plains Organized 1823.
47	Training Ground			W. of Bridge At Silvernails.	Gallatin, New York	For New York State Militia of The Gallatin District. Jeremiah Cronk, Fifer, 1812.
48	First Schoolhouse			Co. Rd. S. of Germantown.	Germantown, New York	First Schoolhouse in Germantown. Built by Palatines in 1711. Located Just West of This Point.
49	First Reformed Church			NYS 9G, S. of N. Germantown.	Germantown, New York	First Reformed Church of The Protestant Dutch in Germantown. Erected in 1728 And Was Located 500 Ft. West of This Point.
50	Rockefeller Home			Co. Rd., E. of Germantown.	Germantown, New York	Home of Simeon, Son of Diell Rockefeller Who Landed At East Camp, 1733.
51	Sharps Landing			NYS 9G, S. of N. Germantown.	Germantown, New York	Active in Trading in 1684.
52	Site of The Second Reformed Church			Co. Rd., E. of Germantown.	Germantown, New York	Site of The Second Reformed Church of Germantown. Built Here in 1814.
53	Site of Grist And Saw Mill			Co. Rd. from Germantown, West of NYS 9G.	Germantown, New York	Site of Grist And Saw Mill Erected by Diell Rockefeller in 1751.
54	Site of First Lutheran Church			NYS 9G, S. of N. Germantown.	Germantown, New York	Site of First Lutheran Church in Germantown. Erected in 1710.
55	Third Lutheran Church			Co. Rd., N. of Viewmonte.	Germantown, New York	Third Lutheran Church of Germantown Built Here in 1812.
56	Louis Frisbee Payn			NYS 66, 3 Mis. S. of Ghent.	Ghent, New York	Louis Frisbee Payn U.S. Marshall, Supt. of Insurance And For 68 Years Leader of The Republican Party in Columbia Co. Was Born Here Jan. 27, 1835.
57	Columbia County			NYS 9G At S. Approach to Rip Van Winkle Bridge.	Greenport, New York	Columbia County Separated from Albany Co. April 4, 1786. Name from Columbus, Discoverer of America.
58	Parade Hill			Park At Foot of Warren St.	Hudson, New York	Parade Hill Granted to Common Council On March 9, 1795 For A Public Walk Or Mall Granted by "Proprietors, Settlers of Hudson.
59	Gen. Worth House			At 211 Union St.	Hudson, New York	Here On March 1, 1794, Wm. J. Worth, A Major-General in The Mexican War, Was Born. Died At San Antonio, Texas, 1849.
60	Site of Two Dwellings			In City Park, Front St.	Hudson, New York	First in Hudson. Erected in 1783. Proprietors Held First Meeting in Jenkins Home Here. Burned 1838.
61	Site of City Hall			Warren & South 4th Sts.	Hudson, New York	First in Hudson. Begun 1786; Completed 1804. Used as A Court House in 1805. First Court Held Jan. 1806. Sold to This Church in 1835.
62	Davis Hall			Warren & North 4th Sts.	Hudson, New York	This Building Built For A Jail in 1805. Changed to A City Hall in 1835. in 1855, Became "Davis Hall" A Theater. Since 1862 It Has Been A Printing Shop.
63	Lindenwald			W. of NYS 9H, S. of Lindenwald.	Kinderhook, New York	Approaching Lindenwald Home of President Martin Van Buren. 1841–62.
64	Columbia County			US 9 At Columbia-Rensselaer.	Kinderhook, New York	Columbia County Separated from Albany Co. April 4, 1786. Name from Columbus, Discoverer of America.
65	Gen. John Burgoyne			Broad Near Church St., Kinderhook.	Kinderhook, New York	Gen. John Burgoyne as Prisoner of War Was Entertained in This House On Night of October 22, 1777 While Being Taken from Battle of Saratoga to Boston.
66	Lindenwald			W. of NYS 9H, 1½ Mis. S. of Road to Kinderhook.	Kinderhook, New York	Home of President Martin Van Buren, 1841-62 Built in 1797 by Peter Van Ness.
67	Old Columbia Academy			On Albany St., Kinderhook.	Kinderhook, New York	Old Columbia Academy Early Dutch School Incorporated March 13, 1797 Became Kinderhook Academy April 3, 1824.
68	Post Road			NYS 9H, E. of Kinderhook.	Kinderhook, New York	Post Road - 1772 Albany to New York. Weekly Mail Service Established On Horseback. Passenger Service to Covered Wagons And Four Horses in 1786.
69	Quackenboss Tavern			At Junction, US 9 & NYS 9H.	Kinderhook, New York	Here in 1753 For Two Months Sat Commissioners to Divide Great Kinderhook Patent of 1686. Martin Van Buren Later Tried A Law Case Here.
70	Reformed Dutch Church			Broad & Church Sts., Kinderhook.	Kinderhook, New York	Reformed Dutch Church Organized in 1712 Sixth Church Between New York And Albany.
71	Site of Ichabod Crane Schoolhouse			NYS 9H, 1¼ S. of Road to Kinderhook.	Kinderhook, New York	Site of Ichabod Crane Schoolhouse Washington Irving Visited Here When The School Was Taught by Jesse Merwin.
72	Van Alen Homestead			NYS 9H, 7 Mis. S. of Road to Kinderhook.	Kinderhook, New York	Erected in 1736 Katrina Van Tassel Resided in This House According to Tradition.
73	Glynn Homestead			NYS 203, rt 203 on Main St Valatie.	Kinderhook, New York	Journalist Gov Martin Glynn [Journalist and Governor.
74	The Hill			Co. Rd., East of NYS 82	Livingston, New York	Built in 1801 by Henry Walter Livingston, Who Died Here in 1810.
75	Waggon Path			E. of NYS 9G On Co. Rd., Linlithgo to Blue Stores.	Livingston, New York	Waggon Path Yt Leadeth from Ye Manor House.
76	The Kings Hie Way			The Kings Hie Way.	Livingston, New York	1714 The Kings Hie Way Leadeth from the Manor House to Tahkanic.
77	Bingham's Mills			Named For Charles Bingham.	Livingston, New York	Named For Charles Bingham. Formerly Baker's Mills. 20 Dwellings, M.E. Chapel, 2 Mills, Blacksmith Shop And Woolen Factory.
78	Burden			Hudson River Ore Iron Co.	Livingston, New York	Hudson River Ore Iron Co. 1875–1898 Iron Mines Employed 550 Men; 1200 Tons Ore Mined Daily. 1000 Acres Land Owned. Store, Machine Shop, 60 Houses.
79	Calendar House			Built by Samuel Ten Broek.	Livingston, New York	Calendar House Built by Samuel Ten Broek in 1773. Later Purchased by Gen. Harry Livingston Whose Descendants Held It Until 1861.
80	Glenco Mills			Old NYS 82 At Glencoe Mills.	Livingston, New York	Established as Post Office in 1856 Henry P. Heermance, Postmaster.
81	Highland Turnpike			Incorporated in 1804.	Livingston, New York	Incorporated in 1804. An Early Road.
82	Johnston			Main St., in Livingston.	Livingston, New York	Named For John Livingston, Ro Settler. Livingston Post Office 1805. Had A Revolutionary Stage Inn And Linlithgo Reformed Church.
83	Land Marker			E. of Main St., Livingston.	Livingston, New York	Dividing Inheritances of Robert C. And Henry Livingston from 3rd Proprietor of The Manor 1792. Twin Marker At Blue Stores.
84	Land Marker				Livingston, New York	Dividing Inheritances of Robert C. And Henry Livingston from 3rd Proprietor of The Manor 1792. Twin Marker At Livingston.
85	Line House				Livingston, New York	Tavern And Stage Inn Before 1790. John Manny First Proprietor.
86	Livingston, New York			Main St., in Livingston	Livingston, New York	The Present Village of Livingston Was Formerly Called Johnstown After John Livingston.
87	Livingston-Claverack Line			Co. Rd., West of Churchtown	Livingston, New York	Both Districts 1772, Towns 1788. Livingston Included Clermont, Gallatin, Granger. Claverack Included Hudson, Hillsdale, Part of Ghent.
88	Livingston-Claverack Line			Co. Rd., East of Bell's Pond	Livingston, New York	Both Districts 1772, Towns 1788. Livingston Included Clermont, Gallatin, Granger. Claverack Included Hudson, Hillsdale, Part of Ghent.
89	Livingston-Claverack Line			Co. Rd., West of Churchtown	Livingston, New York	Both Districts 1772, Towns 1788. Livingston Included Clermont, Gallatin, Granger. Claverack Included Hudson, Hillsdale, Part of Ghent.
90	Livingston-Clermont Line				Livingston, New York	Livingston A Manor 1686, District 1772; Included Ancram, Clermont, Copkae Gallatin, Germantown, Taghkanic. Town 1788.
91	Livingston-Clermont Line				Livingston, New York	Livingston A Manor 1686, District 1772, Included Ancram, Clermont, Copkae, Gallatin, Germantown, Taghkanic. Town 1788.
92	Livingston-Germantown Line			NYS 9G, N. of Bridge.	Livingston, New York	Both Towns 1788. Livingston A Manor 1686, District 1772, Included Clermont, Gallatin, Granger. Germantown A Dist. 1775; Part of Clermont Added in 1858.
93	Livingston-Greenport Line			US 9 at Race Place.	Livingston, New York	Livingston a Manor 1686, a dist. 1772, included Ancram, Taghkanic, Gallatin, Copake, Clermont. Town 1788. In 1837 Greenport formed from Hudson.
94	Memorial Chapel			Co. Rd., E. At Linlithgo.	Livingston, New York	Built in 1780 On Site of Earlier Church. Covers Old Crypt Which Is The Burial Place of Generations of Livingstons.
95	Oak Hill			W. of NYS 9G, Rd. to Greendale.	Livingston, New York	Built in 1793 by John Livingston, Son of The 3Rd Proprietor, And Home of Succeeding Generations of The Family.
96	Old Road House				Livingston, New York	Built in 1803. The Stage-Coach Stopped Here On Trips Over The Highland Turnpike.
97	Post Road				Livingston, New York	Post Road - 1772 Albany to New York. Weekly Mail Service Established On Horseback. Passenger Service by Covered Wagons And Four Horses in 1786.
98	Site of Linlithgo Mills			Co. Rd., Bell's Pond	Livingston, New York	Site of Linlithgo Mills Grist Mills Built 1780 by Robert Livingston. Named by S. Fox of Fox's Hosiery Factory And Grist Mills.
99	Site of Good Hope Mills			Good Hope Mills.	Livingston, New York	Grist Mills Erected by The Livingstons Prior to 1780. Machinery Removed 1896. C.E. Bingham Last Operator.
100	Teviotdale				Livingston, New York	Built About 1773 Livingston- Fulton House Home On Hon. Walter Livingston And of Son-In-Law Robert Fulton.
101	The Hermitage				Livingston, New York	Begun by Peter R. Livingston During The Revolution And Never Finished. Located About A Mile Down This Lane On Roeloff Jansen's Kill.
102	Town of Livingston				Livingston, New York	Town of Livingston - 1788 Contained Bakers Mills, Blue Stores, Burden, Elizaville, Glenco Mills, Linlithgo, And Walker's Mills.
103	Union Corners				Livingston, New York	Union Corners in Towns of Gallatin And Livingston. Settled Before 1790. Post Office Established 1840. Named from Union Corners House, A Tavern.
104	Booge-Torrey House			Co. Rd., N. of New Lebanon	New Lebanon, New York	Booge-Torrey House Built by Abner Shumway 1786 Home of Arron Jordon Booge 1801-26 Prepared Young Men For Yale And Served as Chaplain in War of 1812 Here For A Century Lived Jesse Torrey's Family.
105	Columbia County			NYS 22, Columbia-Rensselaer Line	New Lebanon, New York	Separated from Albany Co. April 4, 1786. Name from Columbus, Discoverer of America.
106	Columbia County			US 20 At Columbia-Rensselaer Line	New Lebanon, New York	Separated from Albany Co. April 4, 1786. Name from Columbus, Discoverer of America.
107	Elisha Gilbert House			US 20, W. of New Lebanon Center	New Lebanon, New York	Built in 1780 by Major Elisha Gilbert 1749–1823 Contains Unique Example Decorated Masonic Meeting Room.
108	Johnathan Murdock			Co. Rd., N. of New Lebanon	New Lebanon, New York	House Built 1800 by Col. Johnathan Murdock 1758–1832. Revolutionary Soldier The Original Murdock House Stood Above The Road to The Southwest.
109	Kendall Shop			US 20 & NYS 22, New Lebanon	New Lebanon, New York	First Thermometers Made in The United States Produced On This Site.
110	New York State			US 20, W. of N.Y.-Mass. Line	New Lebanon, New York	New York State Explored by Dutch, 1624; Under English Rule After 1664. Named for Duke of York, Later King James II.
111	Site of First Free Public Library			NYS 22, in New Lebanon.	New Lebanon, New York	Site of First Free Public Library Established March 12, 1804, by Dr. Jesse Torrey, Father of The Public Library Movement of America.
112	Chittenden Hollow			Co. Rd., SE of Bridge At Chittenden Falls.	Stockport, New York	Chittenden Hollow On West Side of Falls. Here George Chittenden Built 2Nd Cottonmill in The County Later Called Rossman Mills.
113	Chittenden Falls			NYS 9H, NW of Bridge At Rossmans.	Stockport, New York	On The West Side of The Falls George Chittenden Built The Second Paper Mill in The County Later Called Rossmans.
114	Columbiaville			US 9, N. of Bridge.	Stockport, New York	Incorporated 1812; Act Repealed 1833. in 1813 Had Cotton Factory, Saw Mills, Paper Mills, And Grist Mills.
115	Columbiaville Bridge			US 9, S. of Bridge.	Stockport, New York	In 1870 The Iron Bridge 245 Ft. Long, Built Here, Was The Longest Single Span Road Bridge in N.Y. State.
116	Columbiaville Falls			US 9, S. of Bridge.	Stockport, New York	In 1800 Sloops Came as Far as These Falls from The Hudson River.
117	Staats House			Co. Rd., 1½ Mi. W. of US 9.	Stockport, New York	Built by Col. Abram Staats Between 1654–1664. Henry Hudson Landed Here September 17, 1609 in Sailing Up Hudson River.
118	Stockport Creek			Co. Rd., N. of Bridge At Stockport.	Stockport, New York	For Generations Known as Abram's Creek. Formed At Stockport by Union of Kinderhook And Claverack Creeks.
119	Stockport-Greenport Line			US 9 At Town Line.	Stockport, New York	Stockport Formed from Parts of Hudson, Ghent And Stuyvesant in 1833. Greenport Formed from Hudson City in 1837.
120	Stockport-Stuyvesant Line			US 9 At Town Line.	Stockport, New York	Stockport Formed from Parts of Hudson, Ghent, Stuyvesant, 1833. Stuyvesant Formed from Kinderhook 1823.
121	Stockport-Stuyvesant Line			NYS 9J At Town Line.	Stockport, New York	Stockport Formed from Parts of Hudson, Ghent, Stuyvesant, 1833. Stuyvesant Formed from Kinderhook 1823.
122	Town of Stockport			Co. Rd., W. of US 9 At Columbiaville.	Stockport, New York	Named from Stockport, Eng., Former Home of James Wild, Porprietor of Mills At Columbiaville in 1812.
123	Benjamin F. Butler			NYS 9J, S. of Stuyvesant.	Stuyvesant, New York	Benjamin F. Butler Born Here 1795 - Died 1858 A Reviser of State Laws; Regent 1829-32; Attorney General U.S. 1833-38; Acting Sec. of War 1836–37.
124	Cloth Mill			Co. Rd., E. of Bridge At Stuyvesant Falls.	Stuyvesant, New York	Built by William Van Hoesen in 1800. Located Where Power House Stands.
125	Columbia County			NYS 9J, Near Schodack Landing.	Stuyvesant, New York	Separated from Albany Co. April 4, 1786. Name from Columbus, Discoverer of America.
126	Henry Van Schaack			NYS 9J, At Stuyvesant.	Stuyvesant, New York	Died Here in 1823. Built These Two Houses. Was On First Board of Trustees of Williams College.
127	Henry Hudson			NYS 9J, N. of Stuyvesant.	Stuyvesant, New York	Landed Here Sept. 19. 1609 And Was Entertained by Indians Who Encamped Here Called Kinderhook.
128	Landing			NYS 9J & NYS 398 At Stuyvesant.	Stuyvesant, New York	Set Off from Town Ofd 1858 Kinderhook 1823. Now Part of The Town of Stuyvesant.
129	Nutten Hooke			NYS 9J, At Newton Hook.	Stuyvesant, New York	Granted to Arent Van Den Bergh 1666. Sold to Hans Hendricksen in 1667. Old Fish Place 1½ Mi. South.
130	Powell Patent			NYS 9J, S. of Stuyvesant.	Stuyvesant, New York	Powell Patent 1664 The Southwest Point of The Grant Is North of Swarte Hoock.
131	Powell Patent			NYS 9J, N. of Stuyvesant.	Stuyvesant, New York	Powell Patent 1664 This Marks The Northwest Point of This Early Grant.
132	Powell Patent			East of US 9, to Sunnyside.	Stuyvesant, New York	Powell Patent 1664 Directly East to Creek Marks Southeast Point of Grant.
133	Major Abram's Kill			Co. Rd. 25A, W. of Bridge At Stuyvesant Falls.	Stuyvesant, New York	Prior to 1667 Known as "Major Abram's (Staats) Kill" And "Third Falls." in 1823 Called Stuyvesant Falls And After 1845 "Kinderhook Creek".
134	John Woodward Philip			Nw of Kinderhook, Near Eickybush.	Stuyvesant, New York	Site of Birthplace Rear Admiral John Woodward Philip USN, 1840–1900, Graduate of Naval Academy Who Commanded The "Texas" in Battle of Santiago, 1898.
135	Upper Falls			Co. Rd., W. of Bridge At Stuyvesant Falls.	Stuyvesant, New York	Upper Falls 1St Paper Mill in Columbia County. Built by Pitkins And Edmunds On The Site of An Old Grist Mill. Built in 1800.
136	Miller's Tavern			NYS 82. At W. Taghkanic.	Taghkanic, New York	Site of Miller's Tavern Built Before 1770 by Wm. Rockefeller, Jonas I. Miller Proprietor For Many Years First Town Meeting Here 1803.
137	Maryburgh Forges			On Town Rd., 1/8 Mi. N. of NYS 82 And Suydam.	Taghkanic, New York	Site of Maryburgh Forges Established Before 1700 by The Livingstons. Abandoned Before 1798.
138	New Forge Iron Works			Tn. Rd., North of Suydam.	Taghkanic, New York	Site of New Forge Iron Works 1770–1790 Grist, Feed And Plaster Mills, Blacksmith Shop, Store, Dwellings, 1800–1876.
139	Plow Furnace			Co. Rd. W. of Chrysler Pond.	Taghkanic, New York	Site of Plow Furnace Established 1830 by John C. Wheeler On Chrysler Pond Outlet. 6 Styles of Plows Made. Abandoned 1905.
140	Taghkanic Hamlet			Co. Rd., At Taghkanic.	Taghkanic, New York	Site of Taghkanic Hamlet Included Tavern Built Prior to 1770, Post Office, Store, Lutheran Church And Six Dwellings.
141	Taghkanic-Claverack Line			Co. Rd., South of Churchtown.	Taghkanic, New York	Taghkanic Organized 1803 as Granger, Included Copake, Claverack, A District 1772. Hillsdale Removed 1782. Hudson 1785. Organized as Town 1788.
142	Taghkanic-Claverack Line			Co. Rd., Near Churchtown.	Taghkanic, New York	Taghkanic Organized 1803 as Granger, Included Copake, Claverack, A District 1772. Hillsdale Removed 1782. Hudson 1785. Organized as Town 1788.
143	Taghkanic-Hillsdale Line			NYS 23, W. of Craryville.	Taghkanic, New York	Taghkanic Organized 1803 as Granger, Included Copake. Both Taken from Livingston. Name Changed to Taghkanic 1814. Copake Taken Off 1824.
144	Taghkanic-Hillsdale Line			NYS 23, W. of Craryville.	Taghkanic, New York	Taghkanic Organized 1803 as Granger, Included Copake. Hillsdale Formed from Claverack as District 1782. Organized as Town 1788.
145	Taghkanic-Livingston Line			NYS 82. Near Glencoe Mills.	Taghkanic, New York	Tahjkanic Org'D 1803 as Granger, Included Copake. Livingston, A Manor 1786; Dist. 1772; Town 1788; Included Gallatin, Ancram, Taghkanic, Copake.
146	Town of Taghkanic			NYS 82. At W. Taghkanic.	Taghkanic, New York	Taghkanic Organized 1803 as Granger. Name Changed to Taghkanic 1814. Copake Taken Off in 1824.
147	Town of Kinderhook			2589 Route 9H, Kinderhook	Kinderhook, New York	Washington Irving Based the Character Ichabod Crane in The Legend of Sleepy Hollow on Kinderhook Schoolteacher, Jesse Merwin.
148	Town of Kinderhook			1319 River Street, Valatie	Kinderhook, New York	18th century ancestral home of 8th president of the US, President Martin Van Buren's Mother, Maria Hoes Van Alen. Located in the Village of Valatie.

== See also ==
- List of New York State Historic Markers
- National Register of Historic Places listings in New York
- List of National Historic Landmarks in New York
