= Lynch House =

Lynch House may refer to:

in the United Kingdom

- Lynch House (Bedfordshire), Kensworth, a Grade II* listed building in Bedfordshire

in the United States

(by state, then city)

- Thomas Lynch House, Morning Star, Arkansas, listed on the National Register of Historic Places
- Timothy J. Lynch House, Maywood, Illinois, listed on the National Register of Historic Places
- Lynch-O'Gorman House, Brookline, Massachusetts
- James A. Lynch House, Manchester, Michigan, a Michigan State Historic Site
- James Lynch House, Nutten Hook, New York
- Matthew J. and Florence Lynch House and Garden, Portland, Oregon
- Victoria Hall (Pittsburgh), Pennsylvania, formerly known as Lynch House
- Matthew Lynch House, Providence, Rhode Island
- Fairfield Plantation (Charleston County, South Carolina), also known as Lynch House
- Lynch's Brickyard House, Lynchburg, Virginia
