= Lewis A. Swyer Preserve =

Nature reserve in Stuyvesant, New York

- Lewis A. Swyer Preserve
- Location within New York
- Nearest city: Stuyvesant
- Coordinates: 42.417891°N 73.76069°W
- Area: 95 acres (38 ha)
- Established: 1989
- Governing body: The Nature Conservancy
- Website: www.nature.org/en-us/get-involved/how-to-help/places-we-protect/eastern-lewis-a-swyer-preserve/?en_txn1=bl.ch_ny.eg.x.g

The Lewis A. Swyer Preserve is located in Stuyvesant New York. The site was acquired from Conrail in 1989 and is 95 acres. The area is home to one of the 5 freshwater tidal swamp areas in New York State. The site is administered by The Nature Conservancy.
