= St. John's Evangelical Lutheran Church (Livingston, New York) =

Historic church in New York, United States

- U.S. National Register of Historic Places
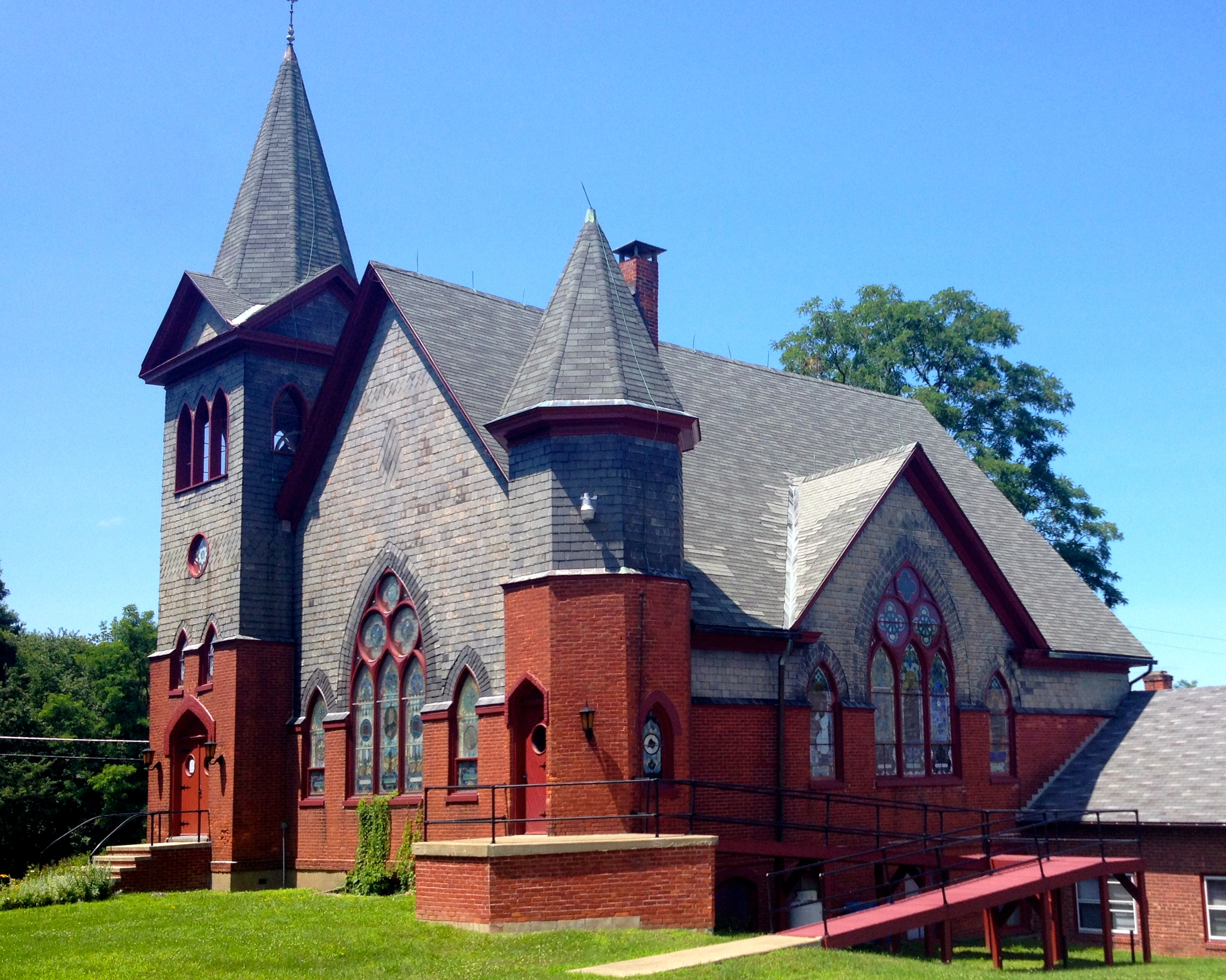
- St. John's Evangelical Lutheran Church, Livingston, NY photo 2014.

- Location within New York Location within the United States
- Location: 923 NY 19, Livingston, New York
- Coordinates: 42°5′36″N 73°47′48″W
- Area: 4.9 acres (2.0 ha)
- Built: 1901
- Architect: Klingman, Samuel L.
- Architectural style: Late Gothic Revival
- NRHP reference No.: 01001437
- Added to NRHP: January 11, 2002

St. John's Evangelical Lutheran Church is a historic Evangelical Lutheran church at 923 NY 19 in Livingston, Columbia County, New York. It was built in 1901-1902 and is a brick building with a medium pitched gable roof, deep bracketed cornice, and semi-engaged tower in the center bay of the front facade in the Late Gothic Revival style church. It is a one-story building constructed of red pressed brick and wood frame, a high basement level, a high pitched gable roof, and two prominent towers of different heights. The front gable features a three part pointed arch window. The adjacent cemetery contains approximately 2,200 burials dating from 1821 to the present.

It was listed on the National Register of Historic Places in 2002.
