= Forth House =

Historic house in New York, United States

- U.S. National Register of Historic Places
- Location within New York Location within the United States
- Nearest city: 2751 US-9, Livingston, New York
- Coordinates: 42°9′30.1″N 73°46′13.97″W
- Area: 9.7 acres (3.9 ha)
- Built: 1835
- Architectural style: Greek Revival
- NRHP reference No.: 10000331
- Added to NRHP: June 11, 2010

Forth House is a historic home located at Livingston in Columbia County, New York. It was built between 1835 and 1840 and is a large, classically proportioned hipped roof structure in the Greek Revival style. It was the last major high-style, sophisticated masonry dwelling built for the Livingston family.

It was listed on the National Register of Historic Places in 2010.
