= Oak Hill (Linlithgo, New York) =

Historic house in New York, United States

- U.S. National Register of Historic Places
- Location within New York Location within the United States
- Nearest city: Linlithgo, New York
- Coordinates: 42°12′0″N 73°50′40″W
- Area: 200 acres (81 ha)
- Built: 1795
- Architectural style: Colonial Revival, Greek Revival, Federal
- NRHP reference No.: 79001573
- Added to NRHP: June 26, 1979

Oak Hill is a historic estate located at Linlithgo in Columbia County, New York.

== History ==
Oak Hill was built in 1793 by John Livingston, the twelfth of thirteen children born to Robert Livingston, third lord of Livingston Manor, and his wife Maria Thong (1711–1765), the granddaughter of Governor Rip Van Dam.

John Livingston was born February 21, 1750, in New York. His father expected his sons to take their place as his business agents and, like his older brothers, John was educated accordingly. He engaged in land speculation on both sides of the Hudson. In 1788, he served as aide-de-camp to Brigadier General George Clinton.

In his will, Robert Livingston, who died in 1790, devised his land lying east of the Post Road to four of his sons, Walter, Robert C., Henry, and John, each receiving about 28,000 acres; each received also a part of the domain to the west of that road. Originally the land was covered with timber, principally pine and oak. John settled a little south of Johnstown, now known as Livingston, which was named after him, and there built the house afterwards occupied by Philip L. Hoffman, grandfather of the late Governor Hoffman; later it was the home of John's younger brother Hendrick "Henry" (1752–1823). After John sold that property to Mr. Hoffman he moved to Oak Hill. In 1787, John Livingston served as supervisor of the Town of Livingston.

John Livingston married Maria Ann Leroy, daughter of Jacob Leroy and Cornelia Rutgers. His second wife was his first cousin, Catherine (Livingston) Ridley, the daughter of his uncle William Livingston, and the widow of Matthew Ridley. The wedding took place in November 1796 at Government House (New York City), the then residence of Governor John Jay, who was married to Catherine's elder sister Sarah. Livingston died at his Oak Hill estate at the age of seventy-two on October 24, 1822, and is buried in the Linlithgo Reformed Church Cemetery.

The home remains in the Livingston family and is used as a wedding venue.

== Description ==
John Livingston chose the northwest corner of Livingston Manor as the site for his house, and chose the location after climbing an Oak tree to witness the stunning views.

It is a 2 1/2-story, brick rectangular block with a smooth surface in the Federal style. Late-19th-century additions and alterations include the mansard roof and cornice, front porch, and kitchen wing. Also on the property are a carriage house (c. 1900), garage (c. 1924), two former equipment storage buildings (c. 1900), corncrib (c. 1900), and a small residence / carpentry shop (c. 1800). Also on the estate are a Colonial Revival style gatehouse (1900), the Caperus Cole house (1778) with later Greek Revival style details, a barn (1801), the Robert Evans house (c. 1890), Studley house (1780), and Gavigan house (c. 1890).

It was added to the National Register of Historic Places in 1979.
