= Requa House =

Historic house in New York, United States

- U.S. National Register of Historic Places
- Location within New York Location within the United States
- Location: 9 Requa Rd., Stuyvesant, New York
- Coordinates: 42°27′32″N 73°46′4″W
- Area: 33.8 acres (13.7 ha)
- Built: 1904
- Architect: Moul, Henry
- Architectural style: Colonial Revival
- NRHP reference No.: 02001325
- Added to NRHP: November 15, 2002

Requa House is a historic home located at Stuyvesant in Columbia County, New York. It was built in 1904 and is a 2 1/2-story Colonial Revival–style dwelling with two porticoed facades. It is set on a slightly graded lot and features a complex roof configuration, with hipped and gable roof sections, gable dormers, and a balustraded widow's walk. Also on the property is a large barn, a smaller brick barn, and a shed.

It was added to the National Register of Historic Places in 2002.
