= Richmond Hill (Livingston, New York) =

Historic house in New York, United States

- U.S. National Register of Historic Places
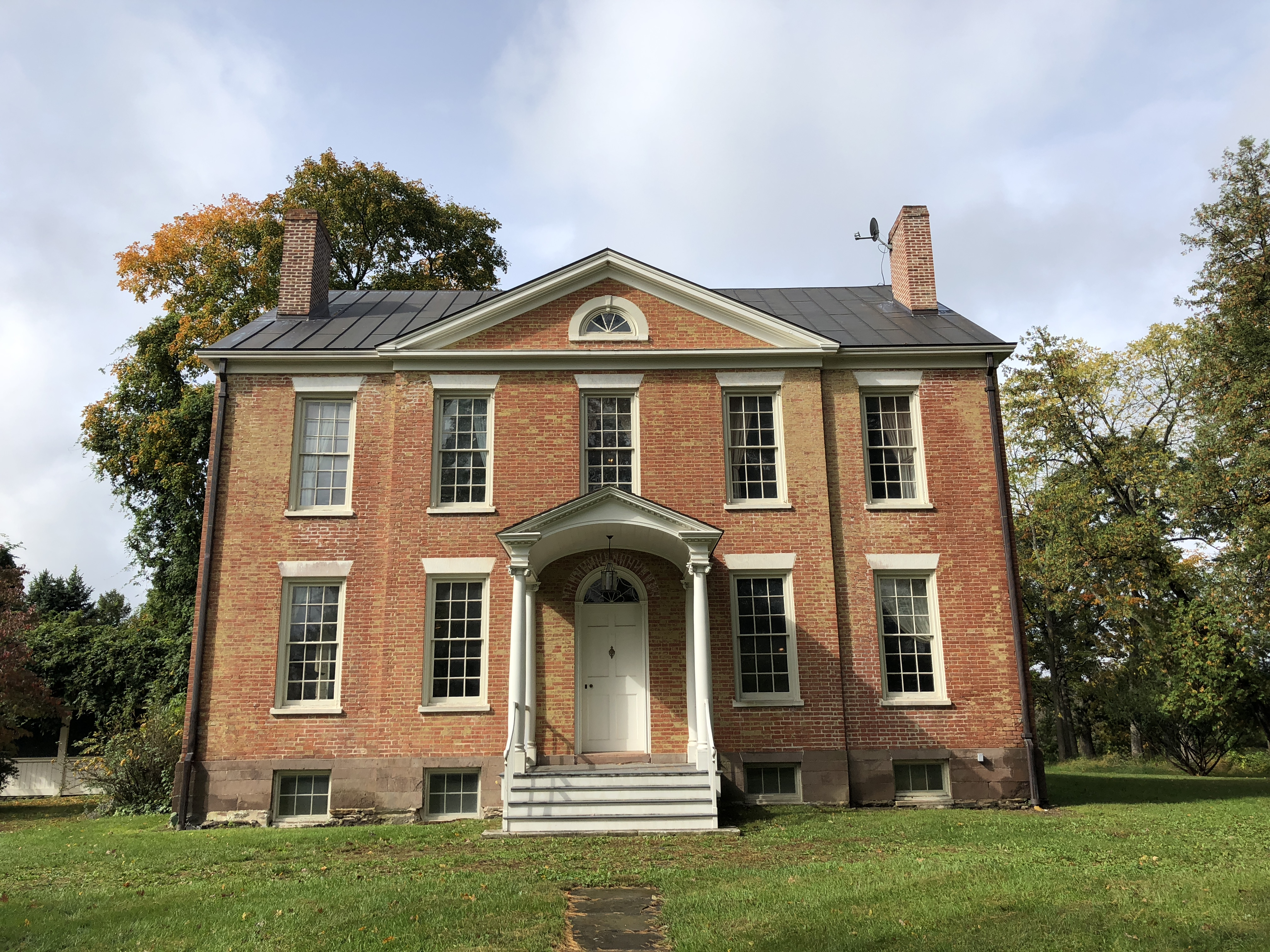

- Location within New York Location within the United States
- Location: CR 31, Livingston, New York
- Coordinates: 42°7′36″N 73°49′11″W
- Area: 269.6 acres (109.1 ha)
- Built: 1790, 1814
- Architectural style: Late Victorian, Federal, Dutch barn type
- NRHP reference No.: 88000917
- Added to NRHP: July 6, 1988

Richmond Hill is a historic home and farm complex located at Livingston in Columbia County, New York.

== History ==
Richmond Hill was built in 1814 for Walter Livingston. The estate includes a large Federal style residence dating to 1813–1814, ten contributing related outbuildings, and one contributing structure. The main house is a two-story, rectangular brick block with a gable roof and slightly protruding three bay pavilion. Also on the property is a large Dutch barn, two smaller barns, a carriage house, privy, shop, a shed, and a well.

It was added to the National Register of Historic Places in 1988.

== Gallery ==
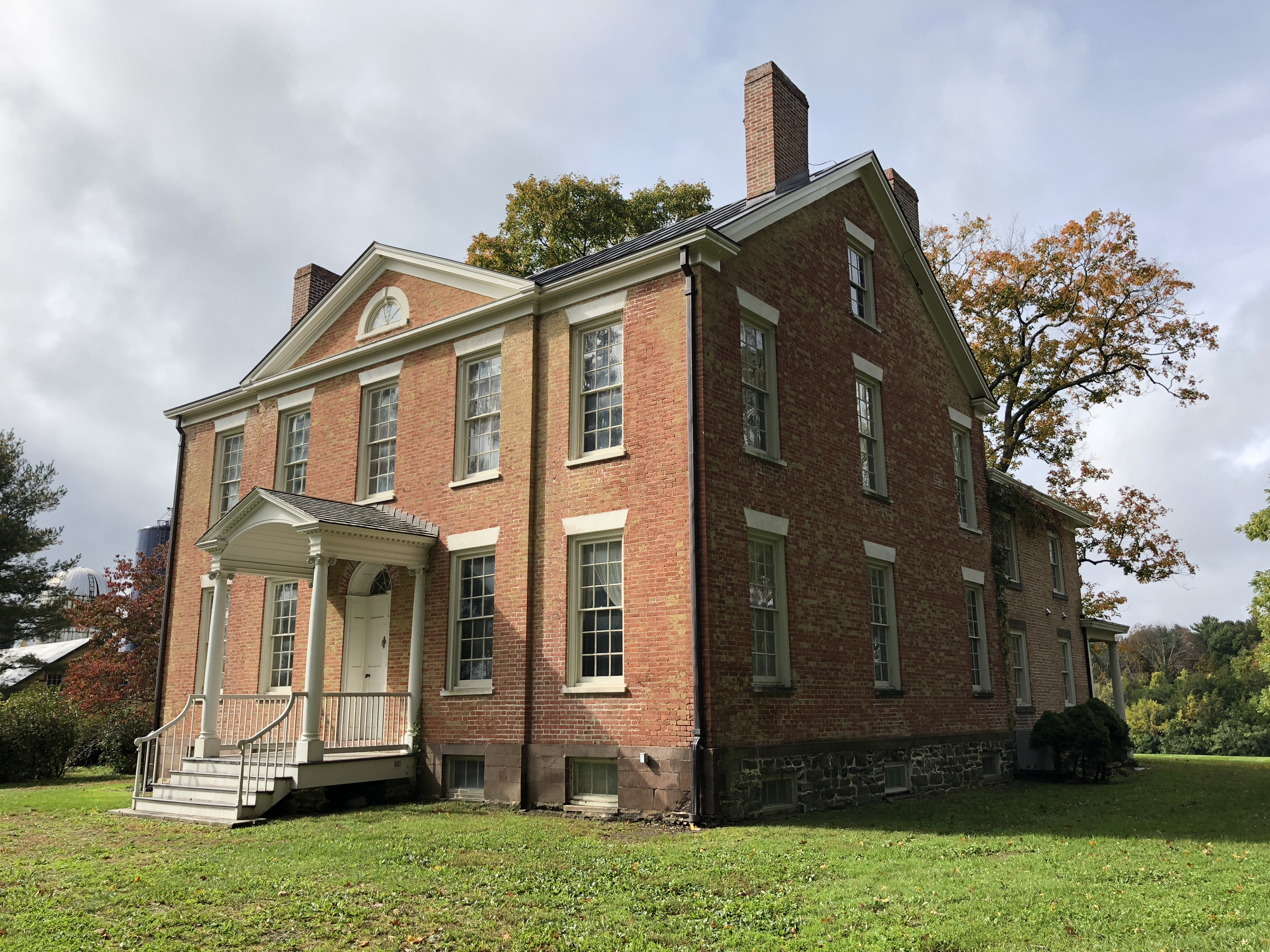
Side view, October 2018.

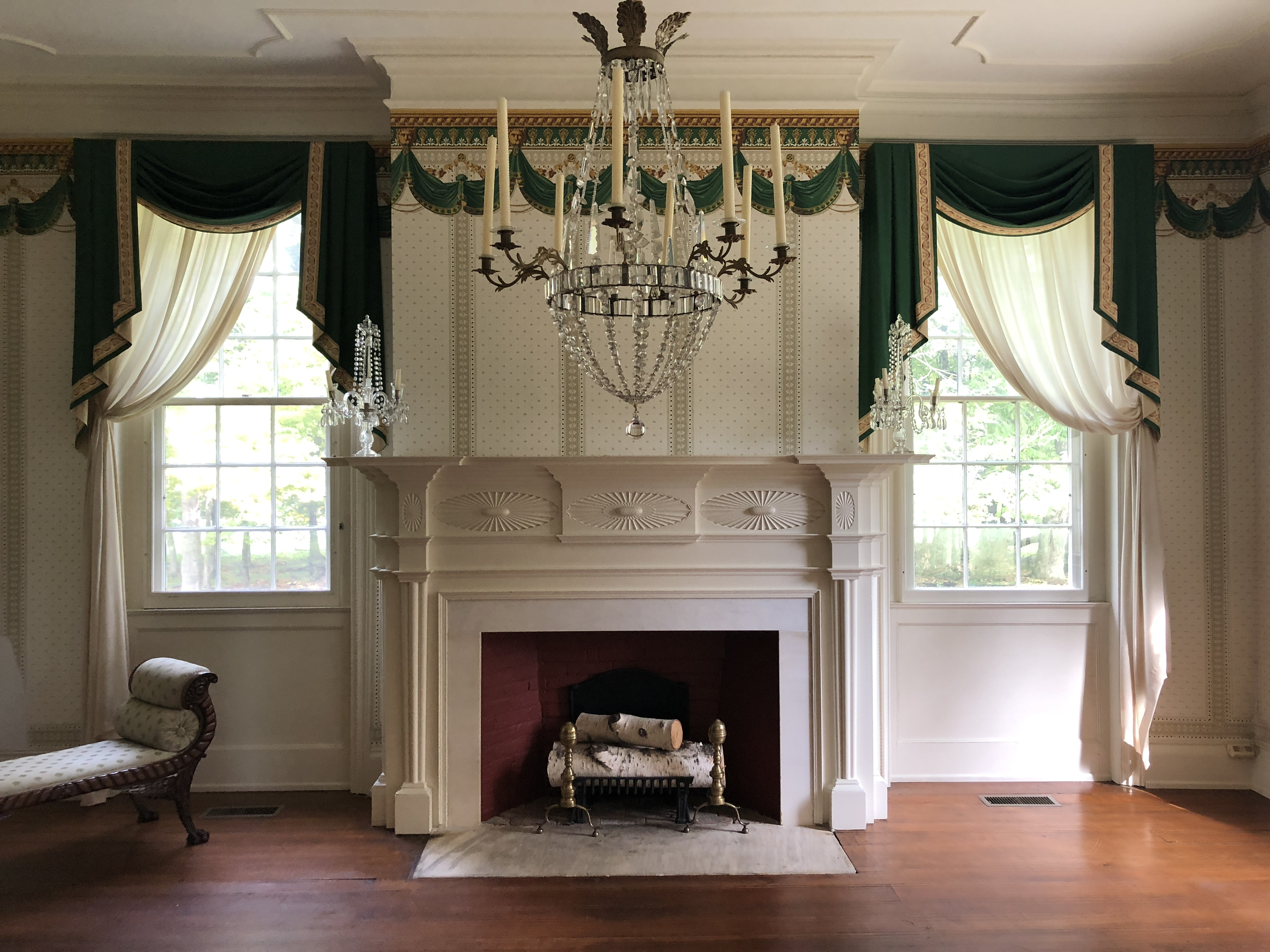
Living room, October 2018.
