= Snyderville Schoolhouse =

- U.S. National Register of Historic Places
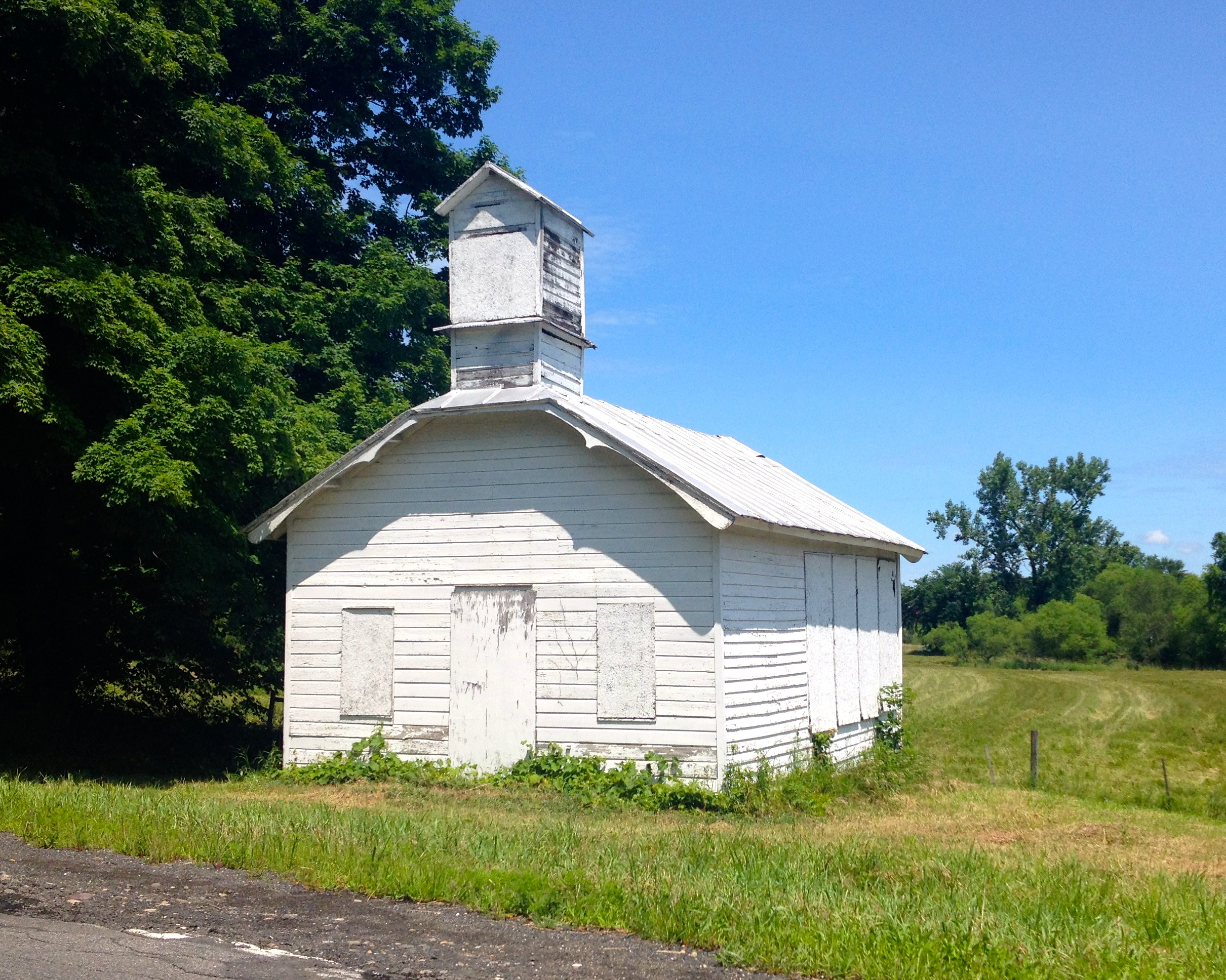

- Location within New York Location within the United States
- Location: Cty Rd. 8, N side, W of Green Acres Rd., Snyderville, New York
- Coordinates: 42°4′52″N 73°45′8″W
- Area: 4.2 acres (1.7 ha)
- Built: 1860
- Architectural style: Late Victorian
- NRHP reference No.: 04000754
- Added to NRHP: July 28, 2004

Snyderville Schoolhouse is a historic one-room school building located at Snyderville in Columbia County, New York. It was built about 1860 and is a small rectangular one-story wood-frame building with clapboard siding and a gable roof. Atop the roof is a small square bell tower. It remained in use as a school until 1942.

It was added to the National Register of Historic Places in 2002.
