= Stuyvesant Falls Mill District =

Historic district in New York, United States

- U.S. National Register of Historic Places
- U.S. Historic district
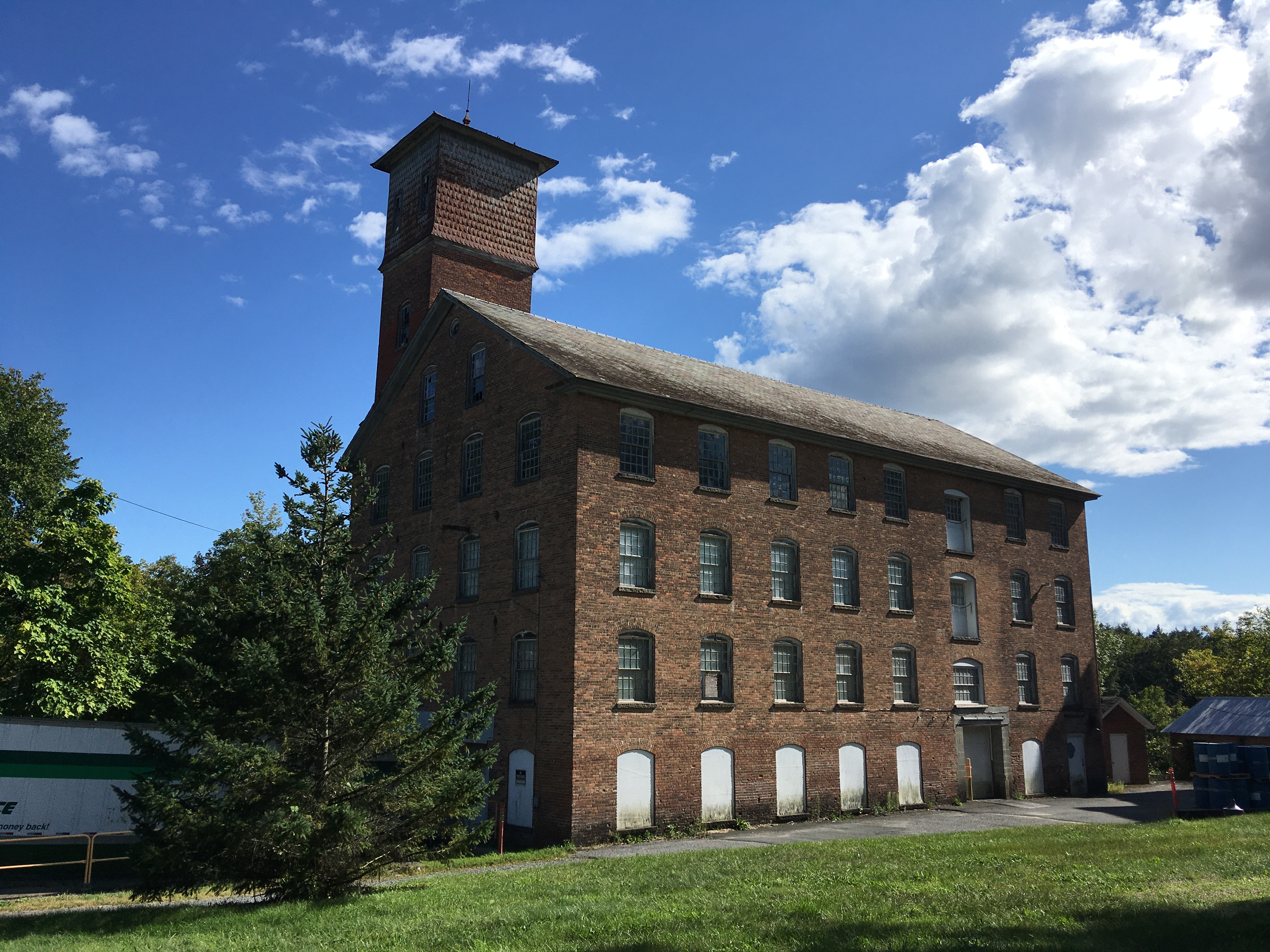

- Location within New York Location within the United States
- Location: New St. and SR 22, Stuyvesant Falls, New York
- Coordinates: 42°21′23″N 73°44′3″W
- Area: 22 acres (8.9 ha)
- Architectural style: Greek Revival
- NRHP reference No.: 76001210
- Added to NRHP: September 15, 1976

Stuyvesant Falls Mill District is a national historic district located in the town of Stuyvesant in Columbia County, New York, United States. The district includes six contributing buildings, five contributing sites, and two contributing structures. They are the industrial sites and power sources from which the adjoining hamlet of Stuyvesant Falls derived its livelihood. It includes the Upper and Lower Falls and mill dams; on the east bank of Kinderhook Creek the sites of a grist mill and paper mill, cotton mill, woolen mill complex and extant hydroelectric plant; west bank operations including three extant 19th century cotton mills and several dwellings. Also included is an iron truss bridge erected in 1899.

It was listed on the National Register of Historic Places in 1976.
