= Burroughs–Foland Farm =

- U.S. National Register of Historic Places
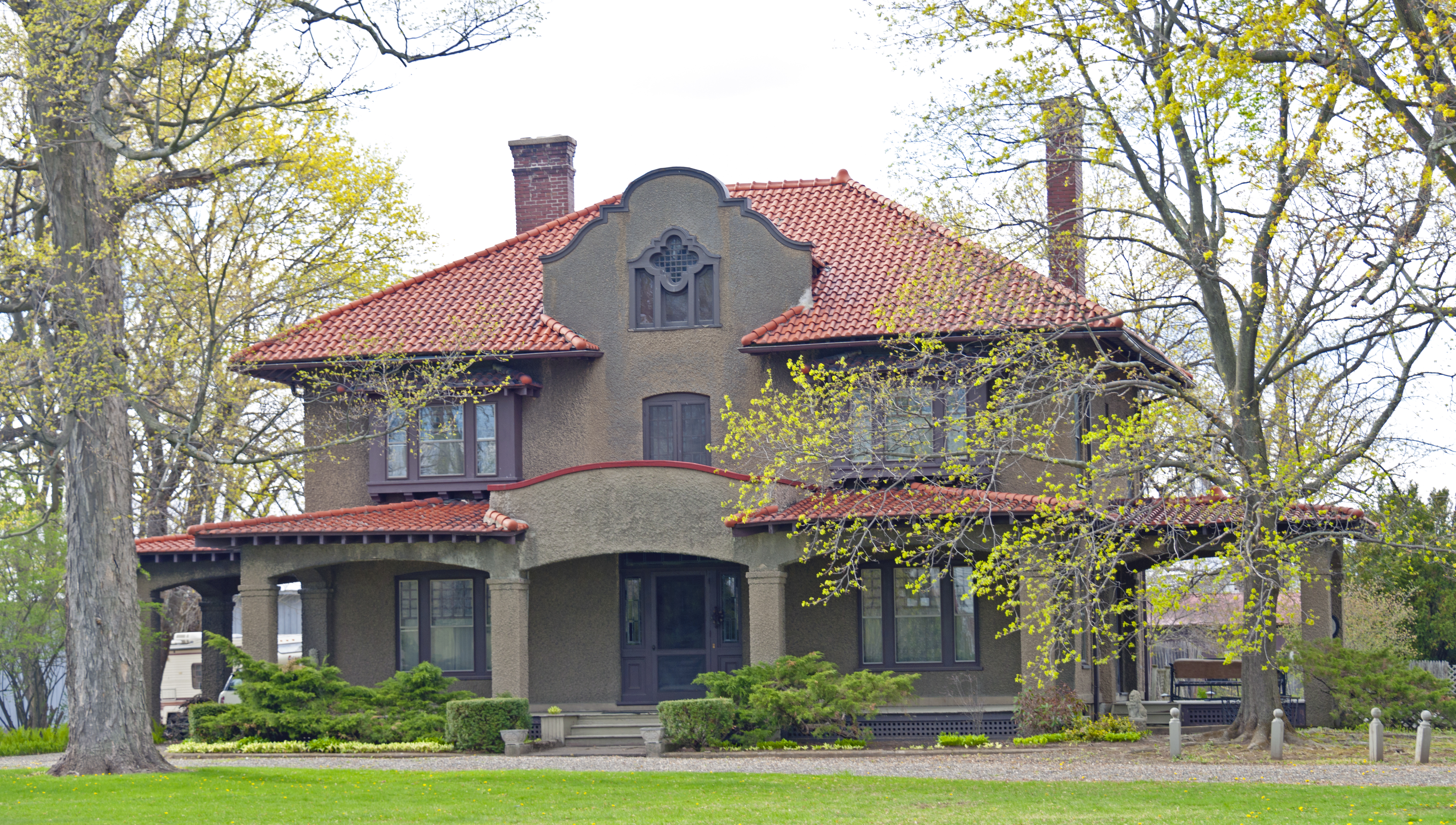
- Burroughs–Foland Farmhouse, May 2014

- Location within New York Location within the United States
- Location: 2323 US 9, Livingston, New York
- Coordinates: 42°06′46″N 73°48′33″W
- Area: 122.56 acres (49.60 ha)
- Built: c. 1820, c. 1880, 1908
- Architect: Linn Kinne
- Architectural style: Mission / Spanish Colonial Revival
- NRHP reference No.: 14000205
- Added to NRHP: May 12, 2014

Burroughs–Foland Farm is a historic home and farm located at Livingston, Columbia County, New York. The main farmhouse was built in 1908, and is a 2 1/2-story, Mission Revival style, stuccoed hollow tile dwelling. It features a full-width, tripartite arched front porch, flanking side porches, and hipped roof of red barrel tile. Also on the property are the contributing carriage house (1908); original frame farmhouse (c. 1840, c. 1885, 1908); barn, cow stable, and silo (c. 1840–1860); truck and tractor building (c. 1870–1880); stable and carriage house (c. 1840–1860); piggery (c. 1860); engine house (c. 1908); and small dwelling house (c. 1910–1920).

It was added to the National Register of Historic Places in 2014.
