= William A. Witbeck House =

Historic house in New York, United States

- U.S. National Register of Historic Places
- Location within New York Location within the United States
- Location: Co. Rd. 26A, E of jct. with Gibbons Rd., Stuyvesant, New York
- Coordinates: 42°23′18″N 73°45′35″W
- Area: less than one acre
- Built: c. 1812
- Architectural style: Federal
- NRHP reference No.: 94001371
- Added to NRHP: December 12, 1994

William A. Witbeck House is a historic home located at Stuyvesant in Columbia County, New York. It was built about 1812 and is a 1 1/2-story, five-by-two-bay, wood-frame dwelling in a transitional Dutch / Federal style. It is topped by a gable roof with seam metal roofing and the exterior is sheathed in clapboards.

It was added to the National Register of Historic Places in 1994.
