= Johannis L. Van Alen Farm =

Historic house in New York, United States

- U.S. National Register of Historic Places
- Location within New York Location within the United States
- Location: School House Rd., Stuyvesant, New York
- Coordinates: 42°26′10″N 73°44′32″W
- Area: 160 acres (65 ha)
- Built: 1760
- NRHP reference No.: 73001175
- Added to NRHP: April 26, 1973

The Johannis L. Van Alen Farm is a historic home and farm complex at Stuyvesant in Columbia County, New York, United States. The house was built about 1760 and is typical of Dutch homes built during the period. It is a 1 1/2-story brick dwelling with a gambrel roof and chimney at each end. Also on the property are an 18th-century Dutch barn, a corn crib and barn dating to the late 18th or early 19th century, and several additional barns and a chicken/pigeon house from the 19th century.

It was added to the National Register of Historic Places in 1973.
