= Elizaville, New York =

- Hamlet
- Location within New York Location within the United States
- Coordinates: 42°03′03″N 73°47′37″W
- Country: United States
- State: New York
- County: Columbia
- Towns: Livingston, Gallatin
- Elevation: 289 ft (88 m)
- Time zone: UTC-5 (Eastern (EST))
  - Summer (DST): UTC-4 (EDT)
- ZIP code: 12523
- Area codes: 845, 518
- GNIS feature ID: 949485

Elizaville (also Ellersie, Union Corners) is a hamlet in the towns of Livingston and Gallatin, Columbia County, New York, United States.
