= William and Victoria Pulver House =

Historic house in New York, United States

- U.S. National Register of Historic Places
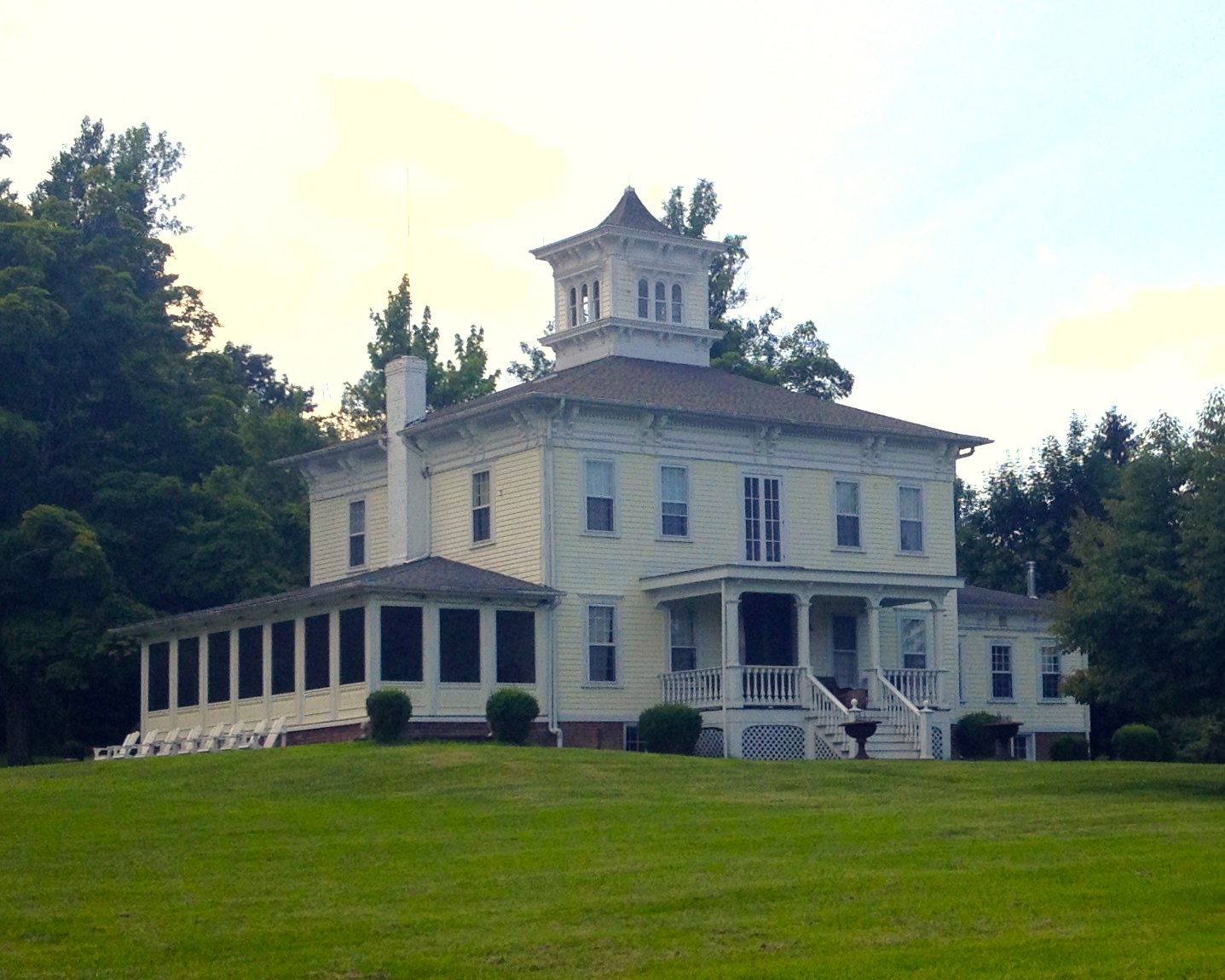

- Location within New York Location within the United States
- Location: 2329 Cty Rd. 8, Snyderville, New York
- Coordinates: 42°4′54″N 73°45′30″W
- Area: 5.9 acres (2.4 ha)
- Built: 1875
- Architectural style: Italianate
- NRHP reference No.: 05000260
- Added to NRHP: April 6, 2005

William and Victoria Pulver House is a historic home located at Snyderville in Columbia County, New York. It was built about 1875 and is a two-story, square plan wood-frame building with a hipped roof topped by a square cupola. It has two, one story hipped roof wings. Also on the property is a shed and garage.

It was added to the National Register of Historic Places in 2005.
