= Lynch Hotel =

Historic hotel at Newton Hook, Columbia County, New York

- U.S. National Register of Historic Places
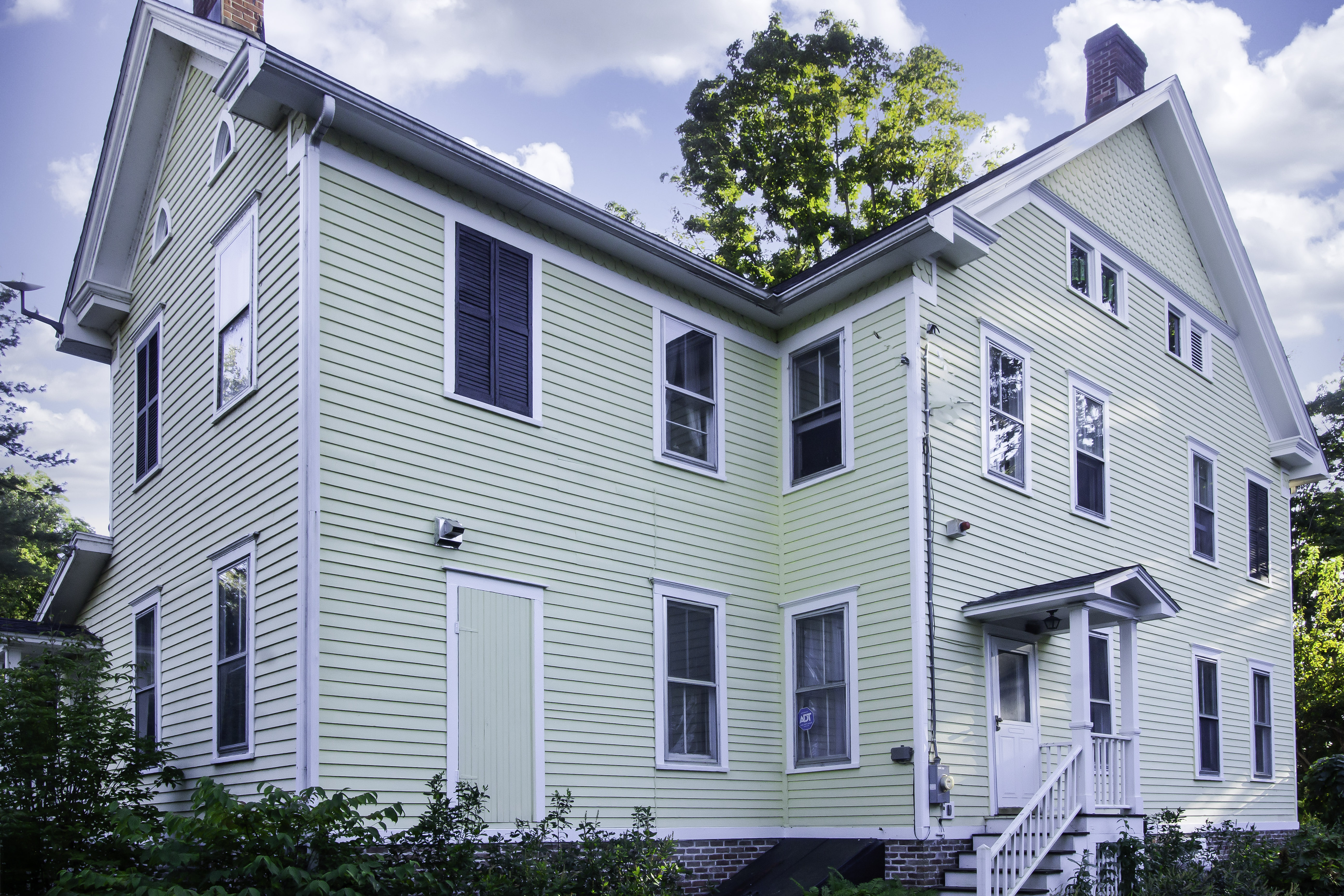

- Location within New York Location within the United States
- Location: 41 Ferry Rd., Nutten Hook, New York
- Coordinates: 42°21′22″N 73°47′12″W
- Area: less than one acre
- Built: 1900
- Architectural style: Queen Anne
- NRHP reference No.: 05000573
- Added to NRHP: June 10, 2005

Lynch Hotel is a historic hotel located at Newton Hook in Columbia County, New York. It was built about 1900 and is a 2-story, five-by-four-bay, frame building with a gable roof in the Queen Anne style. Also on the property is a small barn or carriage house. It has been a single family home since about 1935.

It was added to the National Register of Historic Places in 2005. The neighboring James Lynch House was listed in 2009.
