= Matthew J. and Florence Lynch House and Garden =

Historic building in Portland, Oregon, U.S.

- U.S. National Register of Historic Places
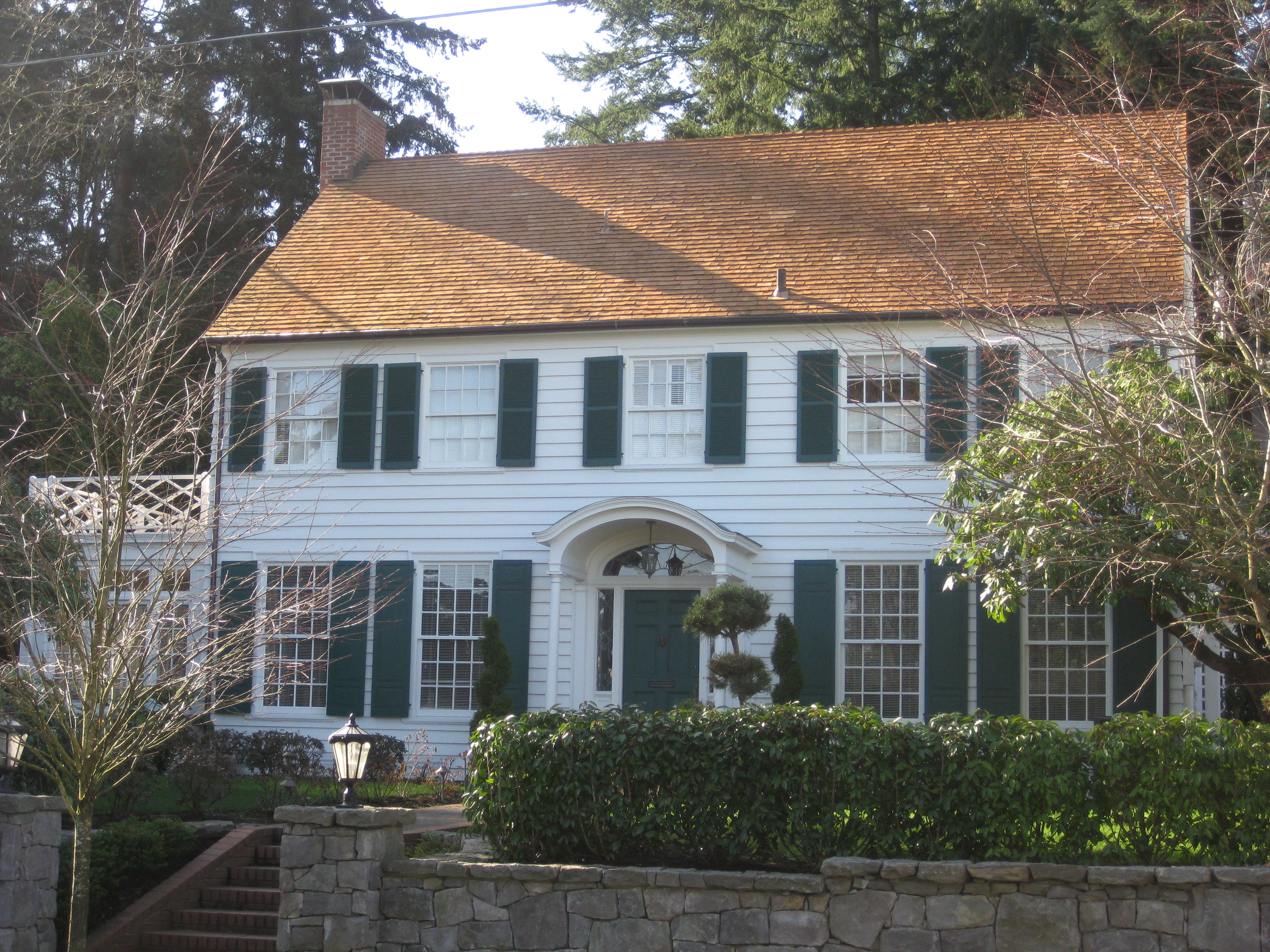

- Location within Portland, Oregon
- Location: 337 SW Kingston Avenue; Portland, Oregon
- Coordinates: 45°31′15″N 122°42′26″W
- Architect: Albert E. Doyle
- Architectural style: Colonial Revival
- NRHP reference No.: 02000674
- Added to NRHP: September 15, 2002

The Matthew J. and Florence Lynch House and Garden is a house located in southwest Portland, Oregon, listed on the National Register of Historic Places.

== See also ==
- National Register of Historic Places listings in Southwest Portland, Oregon
- Lynch House (disambiguation)
