= Matthew Lynch House =

Historic house in Rhode Island, United States

- U.S. National Register of Historic Places
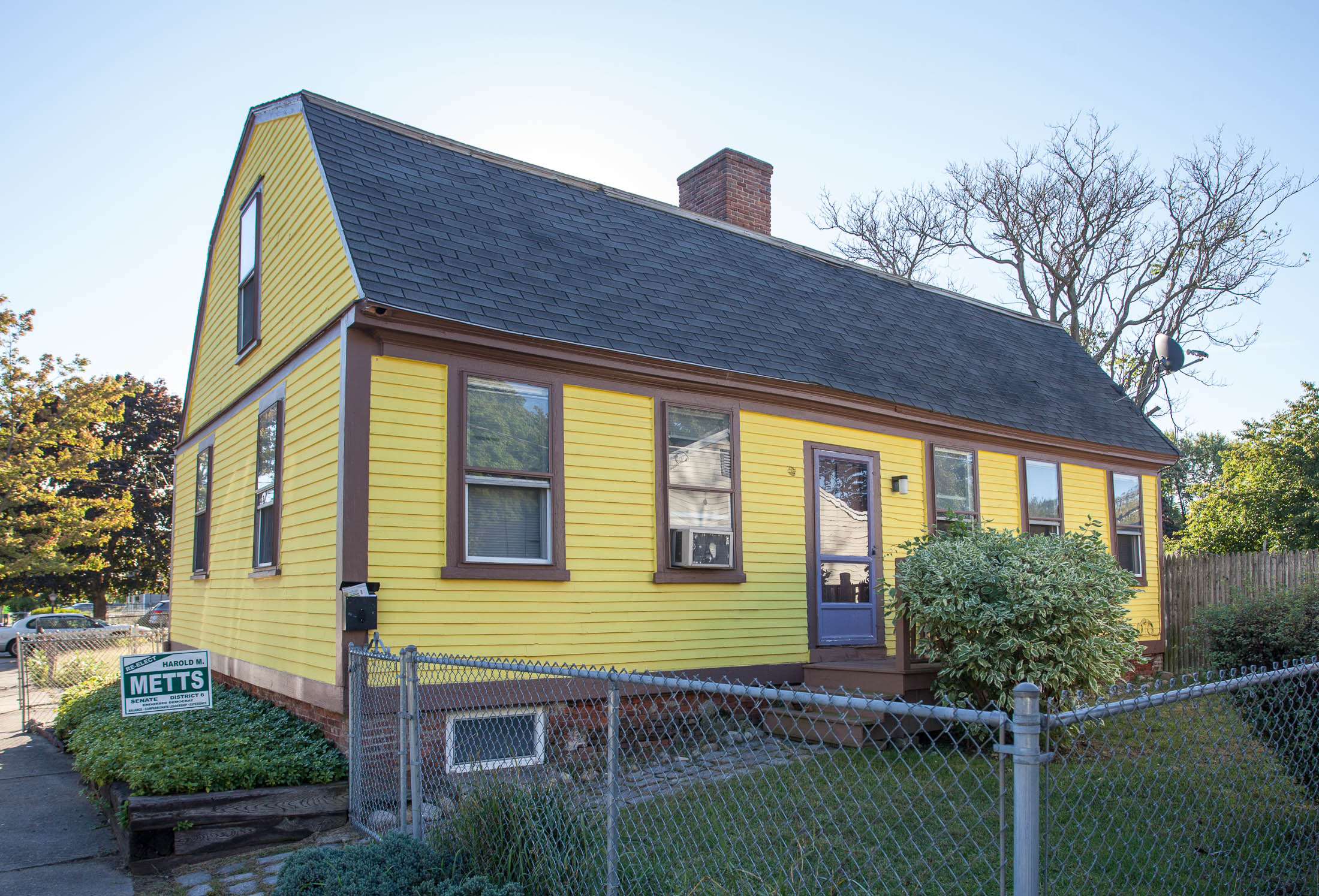

- Location within Rhode Island Location within the United States
- Location: Providence, Rhode Island
- Coordinates: 41°48′29″N 71°25′01″W
- Built: late 1700s
- NRHP reference No.: 78000001
- Added to NRHP: March 8, 1978

The Matthew Lynch House is an historic house at 120 Robinson Street in Providence, Rhode Island. The house is a modest 1 1/2-story gambrel-roofed wood-frame structure, resting on a brick foundation. It was probably built in the late 18th century as a farmhouse on the west bank of the Providence River in what was then agricultural area (and is now downtown Providence), around where Grace Church now stands, on Matthewson Street. It was moved about 1865 to the South Providence area known as "Dogtown", an area of Irish immigrants and slaughterhouses. The Lynch house was one of several older houses moved to Dogtown at this time. The Lynch family occupied the house from 1863 to 1937; the house changed hands several times and fell into dereliction. It was rehabilitated in the 1970s.

The house was listed on the National Register of Historic Places in 1978.

== See also ==
- National Register of Historic Places listings in Providence, Rhode Island
- Lynch House (disambiguation)
