= Livingston Memorial Church and Burial Ground =

Historic church in New York, United States

- U.S. National Register of Historic Places
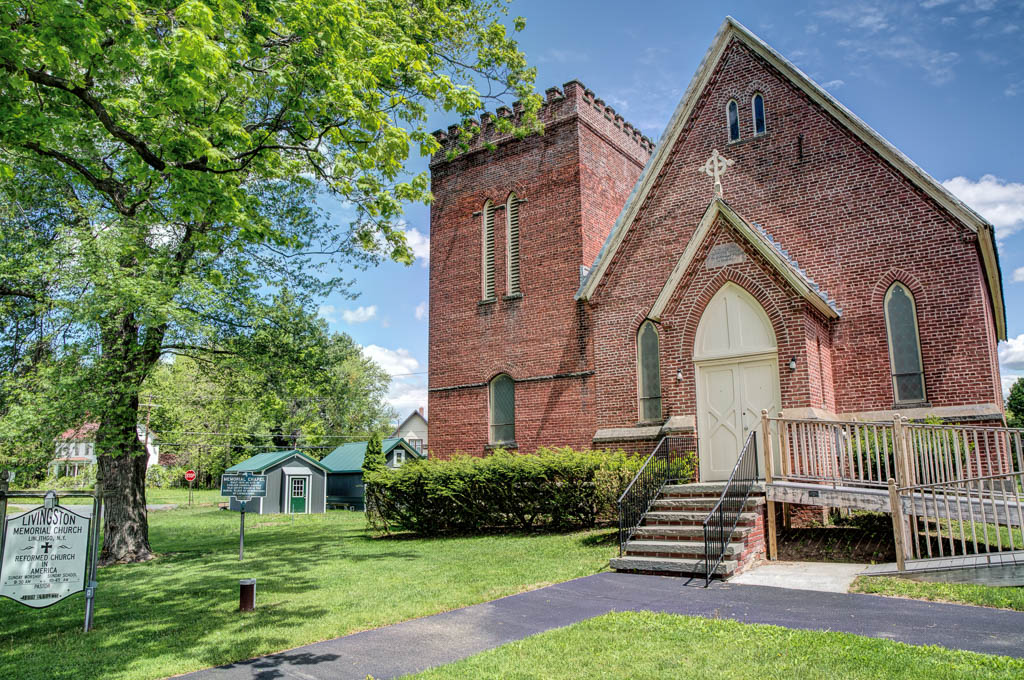

- Location within New York Location within the United States
- Location: CR 10 & Wire Rd., Linlithgo, New York
- Coordinates: 42°10′16″N 73°50′50″W
- Area: 1.3 acres (0.53 ha)
- Built: 1722
- Architect: Avery & Hildreth; Van Buren, James M.
- Architectural style: Gothic Revival
- NRHP reference No.: 85002271
- Added to NRHP: September 12, 1985

Livingston Memorial Church and Burial Ground is a historic Dutch Reformed church at CR 10 & Wire Road in Linlithgo, Columbia County, New York. It was built in 1870 on the site of the original 1721 church and above the Livingston family burial crypt established in 1727. It is on land provided by Robert Livingston the Elder (1654-1728) in his will. It is a one-story, rectangular brick structure, 48 feet long and 24 feet wide. It features a square tower added to the building in 1890 and Gothic arched windows. The burial ground contains 39 stones, with the earliest dating to 1772-1781; burials ceased in 1890.

It was listed on the National Register of Historic Places in 1985.
