= Timothy J. Lynch House =

Historic house in Illinois, United States

- U.S. National Register of Historic Places
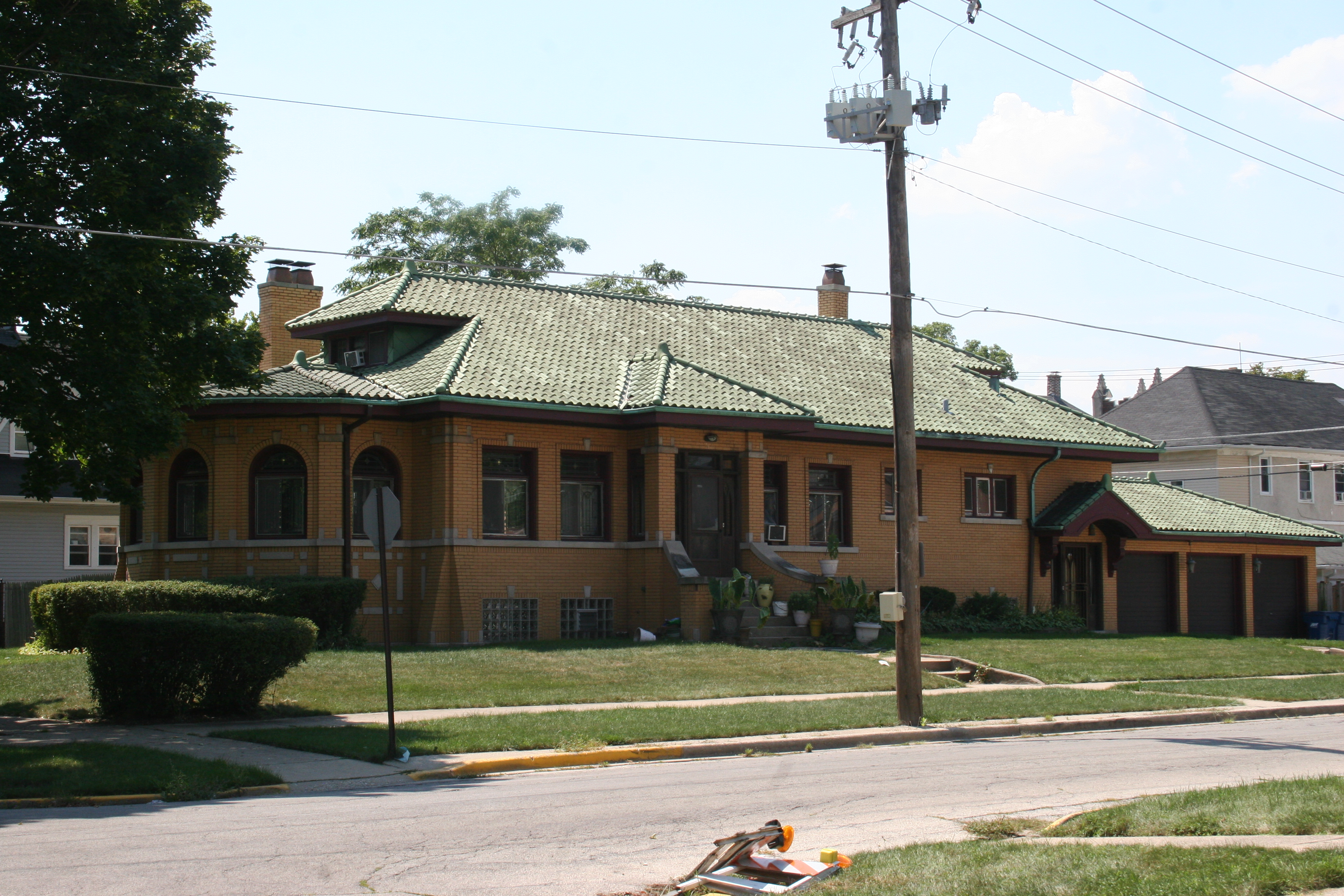

- Location within Chicago metropolitan area Location within Illinois Location within the United States
- Interactive map of Timothy J. Lynch House
- Location: 416 N. 4th Ave., Maywood, Illinois
- Coordinates: 41°53′29″N 87°50′18″W
- Area: less than one acre
- Built: 1927
- Architectural style: Chicago Bungalow
- MPS: Maywood MPS
- NRHP reference No.: 92000047
- Added to NRHP: February 24, 1992

The Timothy J. Lynch House is a historic house at 416 N. 4th Avenue in Maywood, Illinois. The house, a large Chicago bungalow, was built in 1927. While thousands of bungalows were built in the Chicago area in the 1920s, including many others in Maywood, the Lynch House is unusual both for its size and its level of ornamentation. The house's design includes a main entrance with arched sidelights, round arched windows in a large front bay, patterned stained glass window panels, and a green tile roof. Like many Chicago bungalows, the design features several elements of Prairie School architecture, such as the geometric designs in its stained glass windows, overhanging eaves, and wood trim on every door and window.

The house was added to the National Register of Historic Places on February 24, 1992.
