= Livingston, New York =

Town in Columbia County, New York, US

- Town
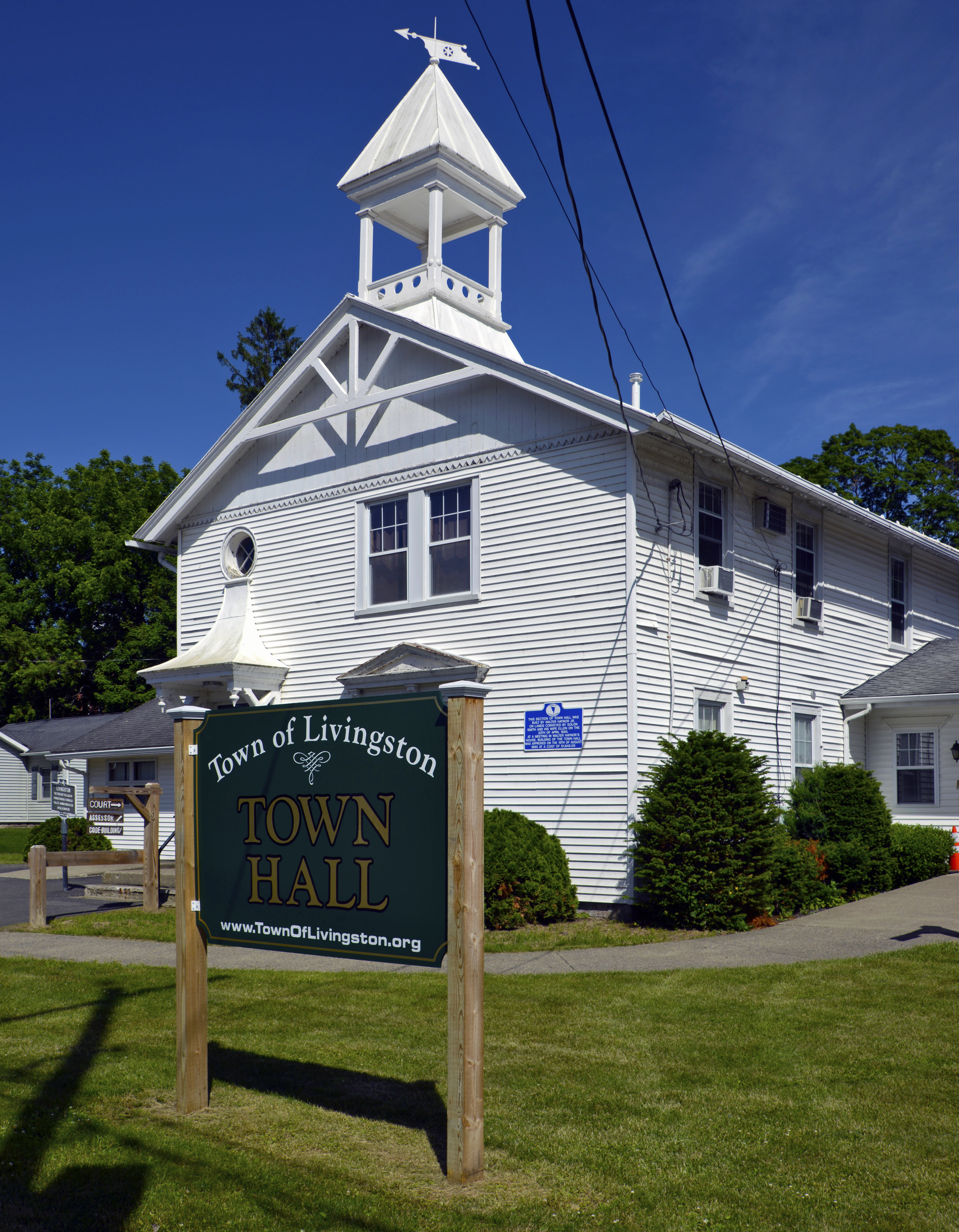
- Town hall, 2019

- Location of Livingston, New York
- Coordinates: 42°07′41″N 73°47′32″W
- Country: United States
- State: New York
- County: Columbia

Government
  - Type: Town Council
  - Town Supervisor: Kevin McDonald (R)
  - Town Council: Members' List: • Will Yandik (D); • William Bender (R); • James Guzzi (R); • Joseph Leto (R)

Area
  - Total: 38.95 sq mi (100.87 km^{2})
  - Land: 38.16 sq mi (98.84 km^{2})
  - Water: 0.78 sq mi (2.03 km^{2})
- Elevation: 217 ft (66 m)

Population (2020)
  - Total: 3,628
  - Density: 95.07/sq mi (36.71/km^{2})
- Time zone: UTC-5 (Eastern (EST))
  - Summer (DST): UTC-4 (EDT)
- ZIP Codes: 12541 (Livingston‑PO box); 12523 (Elizaville); 12526 (Germantown); 12534 (Hudson); 12583 (Tivoli)
- Area code: 518
- FIPS code: 36-021-42917
- GNIS feature ID: 0979160
- Website: www.townoflivingston.org

Livingston is a town in Columbia County, New York, United States. The population was 3,628 at the 2020 census. The town is named after its founding father.

Livingston is in the southwestern part of Columbia County. U.S. Route 9 passes through the town.

== History ==
Prior to 1686, the area was part of the Dutch trading area of New Netherland (Nieuw Nederland) along the Hudson River from Fort Nassau to New Amsterdam up to 1664 (after which it became British). The area of Columbia which Livingston is in was settled after Fort Nassau was built in 1614.

The land grant for Livingston Manor was made in 1686 to Robert Livingston. The region was made a district in 1772, and the town of Livingston was founded in 1788, being one of the original towns of the county.

In 1710, the area was used to settle Palatine Germans.

The Burroughs–Foland Farm, Forth House, Linlithgow Reformed Church of Livingston, Henry W. Livingston House, Richmond Hill, and St. John's Evangelical Lutheran Church are listed on the National Register of Historic Places.

== Geography ==
According to the United States Census Bureau, the town has a total area of 39.0 square miles (100.9 km^{2}), of which 38.1 square miles (98.8 km^{2}) is land and 0.77 square miles (2.0 km^{2}), or 2.01%, is water.

The western town line, in the center of the Hudson River, is the border of Greene County.

== Demographics ==
Historical population
Census	Pop.	Note	%±
1820	1,938		—
1830	2,087		7.7%
1840	2,119		1.5%
1850	2,020		−4.7%
1860	2,014		−0.3%
1870	1,938		−3.8%
1880	2,060		6.3%
1890	2,080		1.0%
1900	1,707		−17.9%
1910	1,620		−5.1%
1920	1,339		−17.3%
1930	1,473		10.0%
1940	1,564		6.2%
1950	1,457		−6.8%
1960	1,770		21.5%
1970	2,280		28.8%
1980	3,087		35.4%
1990	3,582		16.0%
2000	3,424		−4.4%
2010	3,646		6.5%
2020	3,628		−0.5%
U.S. Decennial Census 2020

=== 2000 ===
As of the census of 2000, there were 3,424 people, 1,332 households, and 889 families residing in the town. The population density was 89.6 inhabitants per square mile (34.6/km^{2}). There were 1,651 housing units at an average density of 43.2 per square mile (16.7/km^{2}). The racial makeup of the town was 97.14% White, 1.46% African American, 0.12% Native American, 0.41% Asian, 0.03% Pacific Islander, 0.32% from other races, and 0.53% from two or more races. Hispanic or Latino of any race were 1.69% of the population.

There were 1,332 households, out of which 27.2% had children under the age of 18 living with them, 54.3% were married couples living together, 8.7% had a female householder with no husband present, and 33.2% were non-families. 26.8% of all households were made up of individuals, and 12.3% had someone living alone who was 65 years of age or older. The average household size was 2.41 and the average family size was 2.95.

In the town, the population was spread out, with 21.5% under the age of 18, 6.0% from 18 to 24, 26.1% from 25 to 44, 25.3% from 45 to 64, and 21.1% who were 65 years of age or older. The median age was 42 years. For every 100 females, there were 92.1 males. For every 100 females age 18 and over, there were 91.0 males.

The median income for a household in the town was $37,117, and the median income for a family was $41,827. Males had a median income of $31,205 versus $23,750 for females. The per capita income for the town was $22,434. About 4.2% of families and 5.9% of the population were below the poverty line, including 3.9% of those under age 18 and 5.2% of those age 65 or over.

== Communities and locations in Livingston ==
- Bells Pond – A small lake in the northeastern part of the town.
- Blue Stores – A hamlet in the southern section of the town; so named for a blue store that was located at the intersection of Routes 9 and 31.
- Burden – A hamlet west of Livingston village.
- Glencoe Mills – A hamlet in the northeastern part of the town, south of Linlithgo Mills.
- Linlithgo – A hamlet in the northwestern part of the town. The Livingston Memorial Church and Burial Ground, Oak Hill estate, and Teviotdale mansion are listed on the National Register of Historic Places.
- Linlithgo Mills – A hamlet in the northeastern corner of the town.
- Livingston – The hamlet of Livingston, with the town offices, is on County Route 19.
