= James Lynch House =

Historic house in New York, United States

- U.S. National Register of Historic Places
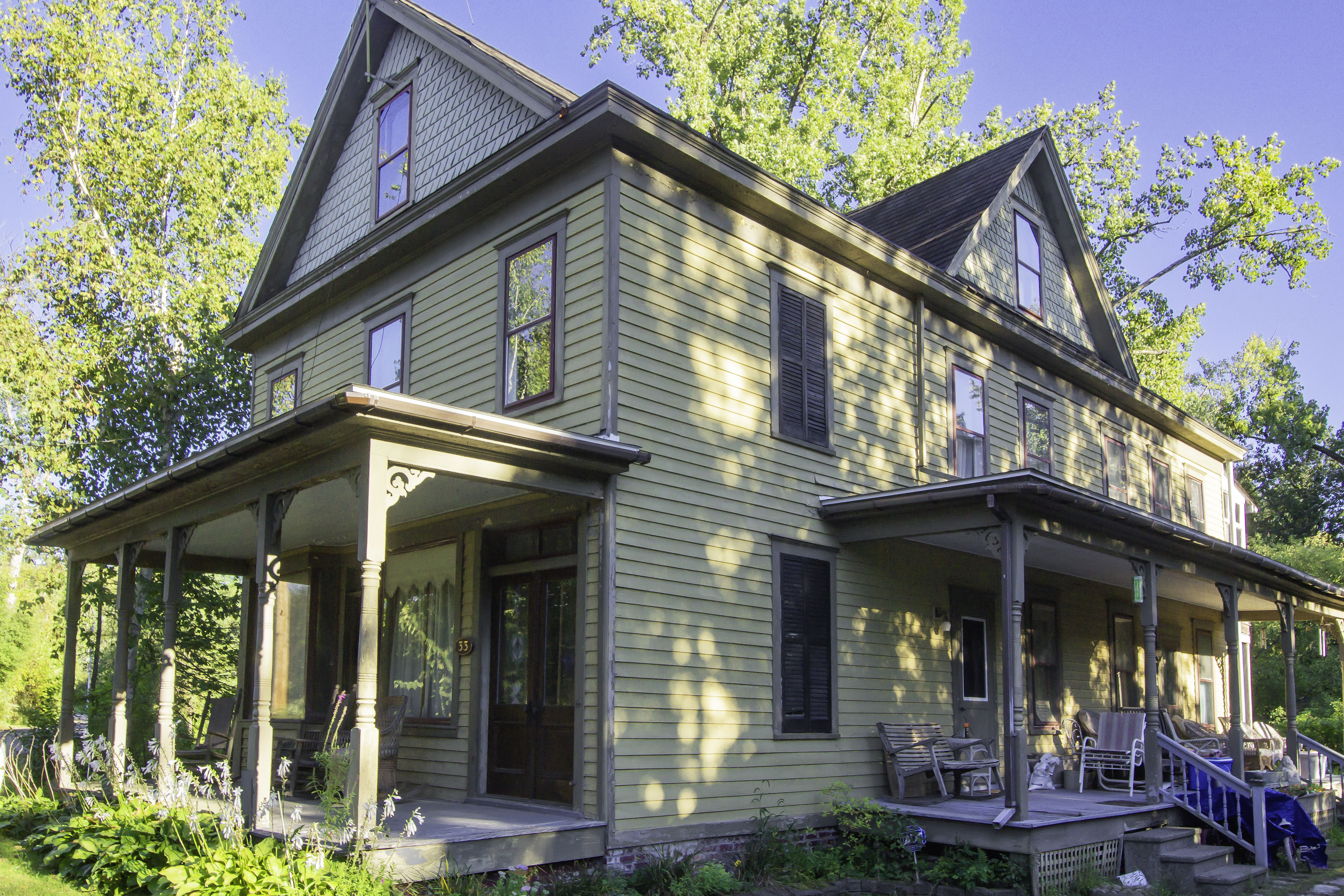

- Location within New York Location within the United States
- Location: 33 Ferry Road, Nutten Hook, New York
- Coordinates: 42°21′15.4″N 73°47′8.41″W
- Area: 0.9 acres (0.36 ha)
- Built: 1900
- NRHP reference No.: 09000906
- Added to NRHP: November 13, 2009

James Lynch House is a historic home located at Nutten Hook in Columbia County, New York, United States. It was built about 1900 and is a two-story, light frame building on a brick foundation. It functioned as the Nutten Hook post office from about 1948 to 1955. It was built for James Lynch, who operated the adjacent Lynch Hotel.

It was added to the National Register of Historic Places in 2009.
