= Abraham Van Ness homestead =

The Abraham Van Ness homestead in Chatham, New York is a historical home (currently privately owned) and accompanying historical markers located on SR 66 near Old Chatham, NY. The marker was erected in 1932.

It was the family home of Abraham Van Ness, which was built in 1749 by the early Dutch settlers at the foothills of the Berkshire Mountains. Abraham was the son of John Van Ness and Jane Van Alen, early settlers of the area. He had built his dwelling of stone which stands today as testimony to his skills at construction. Abraham and many of his relatives were a part of the Van Ness' Regiment of Militia, also known as the 9th Albany County Militia Regiment before Columbia County separated from that county.

Abraham Van Ness was murdered in August 1777 by a band of Tories from John Burgoyne's army, who broke into his family's home, using axes to destroy the doors.
