= Gallatin, New York =

- Town
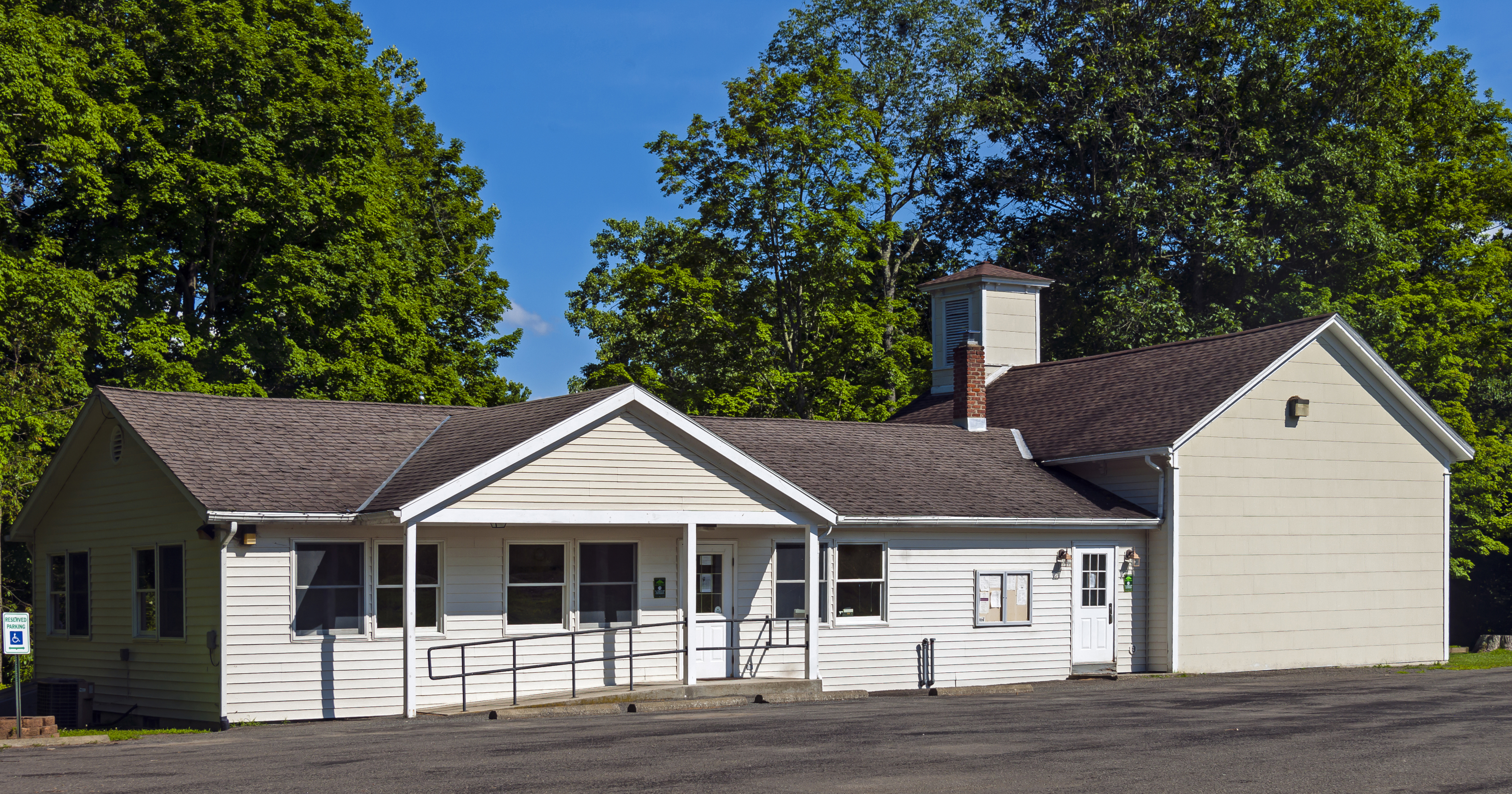
- Town hall

- Location of Gallatin, New York
- Coordinates: 42°3′56″N 73°42′59″W
- Country: United States
- State: New York
- County: Columbia

Government
  - Type: Town Council
  - Town Supervisor: Tara Silberberg
  - Town Council: Members' List: • Shannon Near (R); • Robert Near (R); • Jeffrey Galm (R); • Donald Coons (R)

Area
  - Total: 39.63 sq mi (102.65 km^{2})
  - Land: 39.11 sq mi (101.30 km^{2})
  - Water: 0.52 sq mi (1.35 km^{2})
- Elevation: 1,063 ft (324 m)

Population (2020)
  - Total: 1,628
  - Density: 41.62/sq mi (16.07/km^{2})
- Time zone: UTC-5 (Eastern (EST))
  - Summer (DST): UTC-4 (EDT)
- ZIP Codes: 12502 (Gallatin); 12523 (Elizaville); 12567 (Pine Plains); 12571 (Red Hook)
- FIPS code: 36-021-28068
- GNIS feature ID: 0978984
- Website: gallatinny.gov

Gallatin is a town in Columbia County, New York, United States. The population at 2020 was 1,628, down from 1,668 as reported in the 2010 census. Gallatin is on the southern border of Columbia County and located 100 miles (160 km) north of New York City.

== History ==
The region was part of Livingston Manor. The town was formed in 1830 from part of the town of Ancram. It is named for Albert Gallatin. It is one of five towns in the Roe Jan region and was the largest settlement in the early Roe Jan towns with a railroad station, a hotel, stores, a grist mill, a plaster mill, two blacksmith shops, a post office, and about a dozen houses by the 19th century.

== Geography ==
According to the United States Census Bureau, the town has a total area of 39.6 square miles (102.6 km^{2}), of which 39.1 square miles (101.3 km^{2}) is land and 0.50 square miles (1.3 km^{2}), or 1.31%, is water. Most of the town drains to the Roeliff Jansen Kill, a tributary of the Hudson River. A small portion of the northeastern corner of the town drains via Suydam Creek to Taghkanic Creek, then via Claverack Creek to the Hudson River, north of the city of Hudson.

The southern town line is the border of Dutchess County.

The Taconic State Parkway crosses the town.

== Demographics ==
Historical population
Census	Pop.	Note	%±
1830	1,588		—
1840	1,644		3.5%
1850	1,586		−3.5%
1860	1,533		−3.3%
1870	1,416		−7.6%
1880	1,252		−11.6%
1890	1,016		−18.8%
1900	823		−19.0%
1910	720		−12.5%
1920	633		−12.1%
1930	511		−19.3%
1940	554		8.4%
1950	613		10.6%
1960	621		1.3%
1970	737		18.7%
1980	1,292		75.3%
1990	1,658		28.3%
2000	1,499		−9.6%
2010	1,668		11.3%
2020	1,628		−2.4%
U.S. Decennial Census 2020

=== 2020 ===
According to the 2020 United States census, Gallatin had population of 1,628. The population density was 41.6 inhabitants per square mile. The town had 989 housing units of which 706 were occupied. The racial make of the town was 88.3% White, 1.2% African American, 0.12% Native American, 1.2% Asian, 1.7% from other races and 7.2% from two or more races.

Of the total population, 23.5% were under the age of 25, 13.4% were from the age of 25 to 39, 30.6% were between the age of 40 and 59 and 32.6% were 60 years or older.

The median income for a household, per the 2020 American Community Survey, was $75,000. 7.0% of the total population lived below the poverty line.

=== 2000 ===
As of the census of 2000, there were 1,499 people, 609 households, and 414 families residing in the town. The population density was 38.2 inhabitants per square mile (14.7/km^{2}). There were 913 housing units at an average density of 23.3 per square mile (9.0/km^{2}). The racial makeup of the town was 97.60% white, 0.47% African American, 0.20% Native American, 0.73% Asian, 0.40% from other races, and 0.60% from two or more races. Hispanic or Latino of any race were 2.20% of the population.

There were 609 households, out of which 29.9% had children under the age of 18 living with them, 57.1% were married couples living together, 6.1% had a female householder with no husband present, and 32.0% were non-families. 25.9% of all households were made up of individuals, and 10.8% had someone living alone who was 65 years of age or older. The average household size was 2.45 and the average family size was 2.99.

In the town, the population was spread out, with 23.1% under the age of 18, 5.4% from 18 to 24, 28.0% from 25 to 44, 28.1% from 45 to 64, and 15.4% who were 65 years of age or older. The median age was 42 years. For every 100 females, there were 103.7 males. For every 100 females age 18 and over, there were 103.7 males.

The median income for a household in the town was $42,454, and the median income for a family was $48,393. Males had a median income of $35,500 versus $23,375 for females. The per capita income for the town was $21,041. About 2.9% of families and 5.6% of the population were below the poverty line, including 3.5% of those under age 18 and 9.9% of those age 65 or over.

== Communities and location in Gallatin ==
- Elizaville – A hamlet at the western town line.
- Gallatinville – A hamlet in the eastern part of town on County Road 7.
- Jacksons Corners – A location at the southern town line, near the Taconic Parkway.
- Lake Taghkanic State Park – Surrounding Lake Taghkanic near the northern town line.
- Mount Ross – A hamlet at the town line on the Roeliff Jansen Kill.
- Silvernails – A hamlet south of Gallatinville.
- Snyderville – A hamlet in the northwestern part of the town. The William and Victoria Pulver House and Snyderville Schoolhouse are listed on the National Register of Historic Places.
- Spaulding Furnace – A hamlet southwest of Gallatinville.
- Long Hollow Golf Course - A golf course and clubhouse, established in 1983.
- Historic Rose Mont - An event space for weddings, meetings, and other events, owned by the City of Gallatin.
- Thompson Park - A skateboard park in Gallatin, which also showcased a mural of Ray Underhill by Bryan Deese. Ray is a Gallatin native who was Tennessee's first professional skateboarder.

== See also ==
- List of towns in New York
