= Stuyvesant Falls, New York =

Hamlet in New York, United States

Coordinates: 42°21′19″N 73°43′51″W

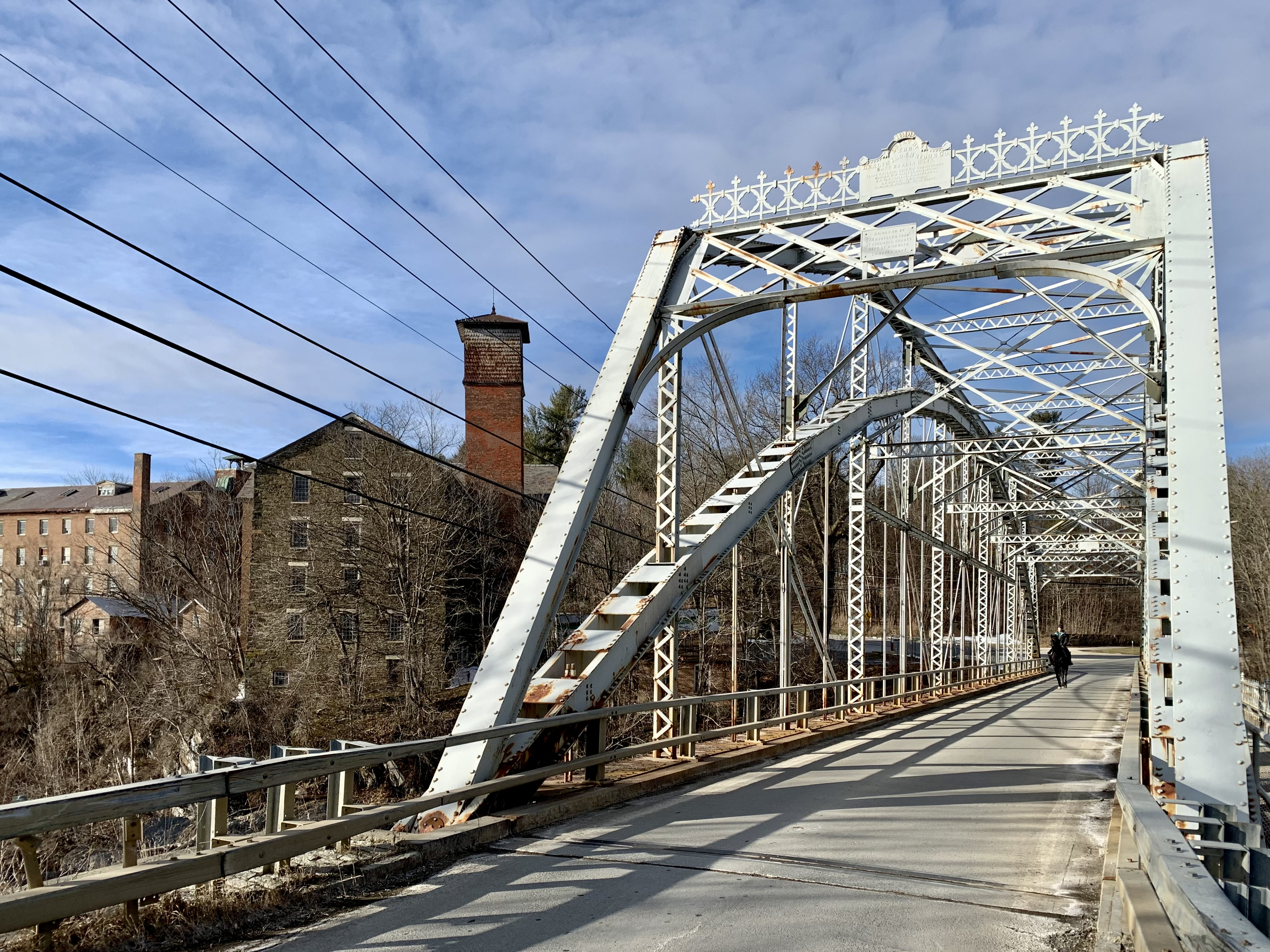
Stuyvesant Falls truss bridge and mill

Stuyvesant Falls is a hamlet in the town of Stuyvesant in Columbia County, New York, United States. The ZIP code is 12174. It was called Glencadia in the 18th century and well into the 19th century, the name having changed sometime after 1848. The French or Scottish derivatives of Glencadia apparently mean a "creek region of simple pleasures, a paradise for animals."

The hamlet includes a substantial textile mill dating to 1827 and a hydro-electric plant. The word "Glencadia" is popular with local businesses and organizations, including the dairy Glencadia Farms, the Glencadia Rod and Gun Club, and Glencadia Dog Camp.
