= Stuyvesant, New York =

- Town
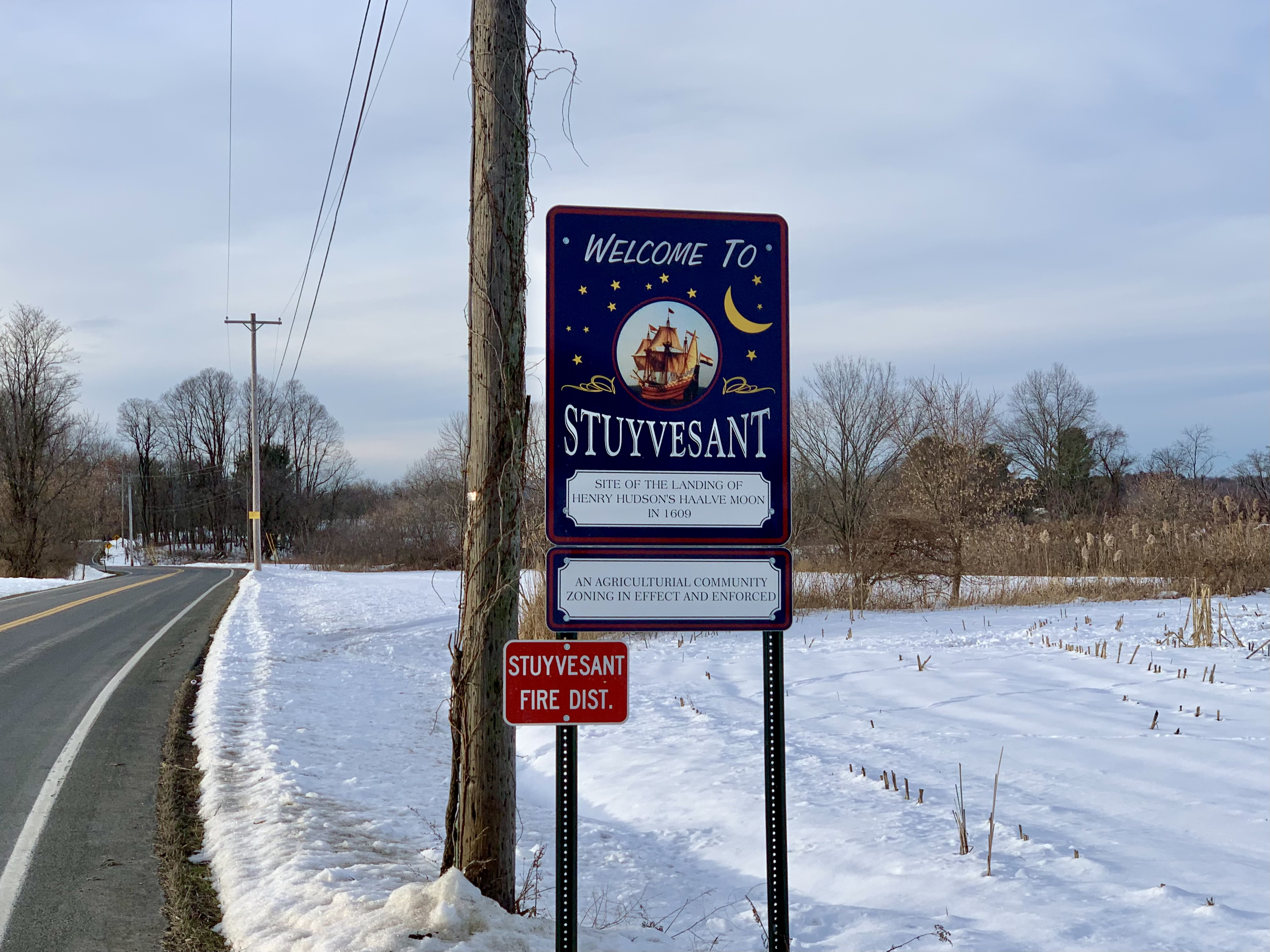
- Welcome sign to the Town of Stuyvesant

- Location in New York
- Coordinates: 42°24′31″N 73°45′19″W
- Country: United States
- State: New York
- County: Columbia

Government
  - Type: Town Council
  - Town Supervisor: Ron Knott (R)
  - Town Council: Members' List: • Rosalind Gumaer (D); • Ronald Knott (R); • Edward Scott (R); • Brian Chittenden (R)

Area
  - Total: 26.75 sq mi (69.28 km^{2})
  - Land: 25.00 sq mi (64.76 km^{2})
  - Water: 1.75 sq mi (4.52 km^{2})
- Elevation: 144 ft (44 m)

Population (2020)
  - Total: 1,931
  - Density: 77.23/sq mi (29.82/km^{2})
- Time zone: UTC-5 (Eastern (EST))
  - Summer (DST): UTC-4 (EDT)
- ZIP Codes: 12173 (Stuyvesant); 12174 (Stuyvesant Falls); 12106 (Kinderhook); 12156 (Schodack Landing)
- Area code: 518
- FIPS code: 36-021-71850
- GNIS feature ID: 0979534
- Website: www.stuyvesantny.us

Stuyvesant (/ˈstaɪvəsənt/ STY-və-sənt) is a town in Columbia County, New York, United States. The population was 1,931 at the 2020 census, down from 2,027 at the 2010 census. The town is in the northwest corner of Columbia County. U.S. Route 9 crosses the southeastern corner of the town.

== History ==
Explorer Henry Hudson visited the region in 1609. The area, being next to the Hudson River, was settled before 1650. The town of Stuyvesant was established in 1823 from the town of Kinderhook.

The Requa House, R. and W. Scott Ice Company Powerhouse and Ice House Site, Stuyvesant Railroad Station, Johannis L. Van Alen Farm, and William A. Witbeck House are listed on the National Register of Historic Places.

== Geography ==
According to the United States Census Bureau, the town has a total area of 26.8 square miles (69.3 km^{2}), of which 25.0 square miles (64.8 km^{2}) is land and 1.7 square miles (4.5 km^{2}), or 6.53%, is water.

The western town line, marked by the center of the Hudson River, is the border of Greene County, and the northern town line is the border of Rensselaer County.

Kinderhook Creek passes through the southeastern part of the town.

== Demographics ==
Historical population
Census	Pop.	Note	%±
1830	2,331		—
1840	1,779		−23.7%
1850	1,766		−0.7%
1860	2,366		34.0%
1870	2,263		−4.4%
1880	2,097		−7.3%
1890	1,953		−6.9%
1900	2,125		8.8%
1910	1,980		−6.8%
1920	1,541		−22.2%
1930	1,440		−6.6%
1940	1,433		−0.5%
1950	1,394		−2.7%
1960	1,496		7.3%
1970	1,665		11.3%
1980	2,216		33.1%
1990	2,178		−1.7%
2000	2,188		0.5%
2010	2,027		−7.4%
2020	1,931		−4.7%
U.S. Decennial Census 2020

As of the census of 2000, there were 2,188 people, 852 households, and 633 families residing in the town. The population density was 87.5 inhabitants per square mile (33.8/km^{2}). There were 929 housing units at an average density of 37.1 per square mile (14.3/km^{2}). The racial makeup of the town was 97.30% White, 1.10% African American, 0.05% Native American, 0.50% Asian, 0.14% from other races, and 0.91% from two or more races. Hispanic or Latino of any race were 0.69% of the population.

There were 852 households, out of which 35.3% had children under the age of 18 living with them, 58.6% were married couples living together, 10.1% had a female householder with no husband present, and 25.6% were non-families. 20.7% of all households were made up of individuals, and 6.9% had someone living alone who was 65 years of age or older. The average household size was 2.57 and the average family size was 2.96.

In the town, the population was spread out, with 25.8% under the age of 18, 6.6% from 18 to 24, 28.4% from 25 to 44, 26.7% from 45 to 64, and 12.5% who were 65 years of age or older. The median age was 38 years. For every 100 females, there were 95.7 males. For every 100 females age 18 and over, there were 95.4 males.

The median income for a household in the town was $49,904, and the median income for a family was $51,688. Males had a median income of $36,087 versus $27,097 for females. The per capita income for the town was $21,314. About 2.5% of families and 4.3% of the population were below the poverty line, including 5.6% of those under age 18 and 6.2% of those age 65 or over.

== Communities and locations in Stuyvesant ==
- Poolsburg – A Hamlet on the north side of Stuyvesant
- Newton Hook – A hamlet in the southwestern part of the town, by the Hudson River. It was formerly called "Coxsackie Landing" because of the ferry connection to Coxsackie in Greene County across the Hudson River. The Lynch Hotel and James Lynch House are listed on the National Register of Historic Places.
- Stuyvesant – The hamlet of Stuyvesant, formerly "Stuyvesant Landing" and "Kinderhook Landing", is near the western town line and the Hudson River.
- Stuyvesant Falls – A hamlet in the southeastern part of the town at a waterfall on Kinderhook Creek. Formerly known as "Glencadia". This hamlet has a different ZIP code: 12174. The Stuyvesant Falls Mill District was listed on the National Register of Historic Places in 1976.
- Sunnyside – A hamlet in the eastern part of the town on Route 9.
